= List of women architects =

The following is a list of women architects by nationality – notable women who are well known for their work in the field of architecture.

== Africa ==
=== Egypt ===
- Shahira Fahmy (born 1974), founded her own firm in 2005

=== Ghana ===
- Mae-Ling Lokko (born 1987), associate professor and architectural scientist who focuses on renewable materials.

=== Guinea ===
- Fatoumata Barry (born 1954) is known as Guinea's first woman architect, and is a former President of the Order of Architects of Guinea.

=== Kenya ===
- Eugenie Dorothy Hughes (1910–1987), first Kenyan and first East African female architect
- Erica Mann (1917–2007), town planner and architect, Architect Laureate
- Emma Miloyo (born 1981), partner in Design Source in Nairobi, first female President of the Architectural Association of Kenya (AAK)

=== Niger ===
- Mariam Issoufou (born 1979), Nigerien and founder of the architecture and research firm Atelier Masomi, now Mariam Issoufou Architects

=== Nigeria ===
- Joy Nwanyelimaka Nsolo (1932–1988) was the first woman to qualify as an architect in Nigeria and across West Africa, earning her credentials in 1962
- Olajumoke Adenowo (born 1968), described as "the face of architecture in Nigeria"
- Fifi Ejindu, architect, businesswoman, philanthropist

=== Senegal ===
- Nzinga Biegueng Mboup, architect, own practice

=== South Africa ===
- Sarah Calburn (born 1964), own practice, residential projects and Johannesburg's Gallery MOMO
- Sophia Gray (1814–1871), first female architect in South Africa
- Nicola Herbst, South African architect in New Zealand
- Marie Huchzermeyer South African academic and public intellectual at the School of Architecture and Planning
- Elsa Leviseur (1931–2023), South African architect specializing in landscape and ecology
- Linda Mvusi (born c. 1955), actress, architect, owns her own firm
- Anya van der Merwe, Cape Town architect
- Kate Otten (born 1964), own practice, community libraries, the waterfront development at Tzaneen
- Magdalena Sauer (1890–1983) was the first woman qualified to practice as an architect in South Africa.
- Nadia Tromp (born 1977), own practice, healthcare clinics, residential homes and community centres.

=== Uganda ===
- Assumpta Nnaggenda-Musana (born 1970), architect, urban planner and academic

=== Zambia ===
- Denise Scott Brown (born 1931), born in Northern Rhodesia; educated in South Africa and London; lives and works in the US

== Asia ==
=== Armenia ===
- Anna Ter-Avetikian (1908–2013), first Armenian woman to become an architect
- Tamar Tumanyan (1907–1989), Soviet Armenian architect

=== Azerbaijan ===
- Gulnara Mehmandarova (born 1959), researcher in connection with UNESCO sites

=== Bangladesh ===
- Khaleda Ekram (1950–2016), architect, educator, researcher
- Marina Tabassum

=== China ===
- Huang Hui
- Lin Huiyin (1904–1955), first known Chinese female architect
- Jing Liu (born 1981), co-founder of the New York design office SO-IL
- Xu Tiantian (born 1975), founder of DnA Design and Architecture; has participated in China's rural revitalizing process through her “architectural acupuncture"
- Lu Wenyu, whose husband Wang Shu won the Priztker Prize for the work the duo completed together in their firm (and whose sole attribution of the prize generated some controversy)

=== India ===
- Eulie Chowdhury (1923–1995), the first woman to qualify as an architect in Asia
- Shimul Javeri Kadri (born 1962), own firm in Mumbai
- Revathi Kamath (1955–2020), pioneer of mud architecture
- Anupama Kundoo (born 1967), innovative architect working in Auroville
- Pravina Mehta (c.1924 – c.1990), urban planner and architect
- Perin Jamsetjee Mistri (1913–1989), believed to be the first woman to graduate in architecture in India
- Sheila Sri Prakash (born 1955), first woman in India to have started her own architectural firm
- Sonali Rastogi (born 1967), founding partner of Morphogenesis
- Samira Rathod (born 1963), architect, furniture designer, educator, own partnership since 1995
- Gira Sarabhai, apprenticed under Frank Lloyd Wright and established National Institute of Design, Ahmedabad
- Brinda Somaya (born 1949), UNESCO prize for restoring St. Thomas Cathedral, Mumbai
- Chitra Vishwanath, established her own firm in 1991, working in India and Africa

=== Indonesia ===
- Elora Hardy (born 1980), Canadian-Indonesian architect who uses bamboo

=== Iran ===
- Leila Araghian (born 1983) Iranian architect, educated in Canada
- Farshid Moussavi (born 1965), Iranian-British founder of Farshid Moussavi Architecture
- Nasrine Seraji (born 1957), Iranian-British founder of Atelier Searaji Architects & head of Department of Architecture, University of Hong Kong

=== Iraq ===
- Dame Zaha Hadid (1950–2016), Iraqi-British; founder of Zaha Hadid Architects in London; first woman to win the Pritzker Prize.
- Jala Makhzoumi (born 1949), Iraqi Lebanese landscape architect and academic.

=== Israel ===
- Lotte Cohn (1898–1983), German born; pioneering figure in Israeli architecture
- Dora Gad (1912–2003), influential interior designer
- Ada Karmi-Melamede (born 1936), Supreme Court of Israel, numerous educational buildings
- Nitza Metzger-Szmuk (born 1945), conservation work in Tel Aviv
- Shulamit Nadler (1923–2016), designed National Library of Israel and Jerusalem Theatre
- Rivka Oxman (born 1950), academic
- Malkit Shoshan (born 1976), founder of architectural think tank FAST

=== Japan ===
- Itsuko Hasegawa (born 1941), owned firm since 1979
- Masako Hayashi (1928–2001), first woman to win Architectural Institute of Japan Award
- Toshiko Mori (born 1951), first woman to receive tenure at Harvard GSD
- Nobuko Nakahara (1929–2008), founded PODOKO, association of female architects
- Yuko Nagayama (born 1975), founded Yuko Nagayama & Associates; visiting professor at the Musashino Art University
- Kazuyo Sejima (born 1956), co-founder of SANAA, Pritzker prize winner in 2010
- Satoko Shinohara (born 1958), presides over Spatial Design Studio; became the president of Japan Women's University in 2020
- Nobuko Tsuchiura (1900–1998), first woman architect in Japan

=== Jordan ===
- Abeer Seikaly (born 1979)

=== Korea ===
- Sun-Young Rieh, practicing architect and professor at the University of Seoul

=== Lebanon ===
- Amale Andraos (born 1973), dean of the Columbia Graduate School of Architecture, Planning and Preservation

=== Mongolia ===
- Biambasuren Luvsandamdingiin (born 1955), urban planner

=== Nepal ===
- Hisila Yami (born 1959), also a government minister

=== Pakistan ===
- Yasmeen Lari (born c. 1941), country's first female architect

=== Palestine ===
- Suad Amiry (born 1951), author and architect
- Khouloud Daibes (born 1965), architect and former politician and diplomat

=== Qatar ===
- Fatma Ibrahim Al Sehlawi, architect and curator

=== Saudi Arabia ===
- Nadia Bakhurji, interior architect, holds several administrative positions

=== Singapore ===
- Cheong Koon Hean (born 1957), award-winning urban planner and architect

=== Sri Lanka ===
- Minnette de Silva (1918–1998), first Sri Lankan female architect

=== Taiwan ===
- Xiu Zelan (1925–2016), Taiwan's first female architect

=== Thailand ===
- Patama Roonrakwit, practising architect, focus on under-privileged housing

=== Turkey ===
- Altuğ Çinici (1935–2024)
- Mualla Eyüboğlu (1919–2009)
- Zeynep Fadıllıoğlu (born 1955), redesigned Istanbul's Şakirin Mosque to wide international acclaim

== Australasia ==
=== Australia ===
- Lily Isabel Maude Addison (1885–1968), early female architect in Queensland
- Ruth Alsop (1879–1976), first woman qualified as an architect in the state of Victoria
- Brit Andresen, Norwegian-born, first woman in Australia to be awarded the RAIA Gold Medal
- Beverley Bolin (1923–2014), first woman to become a registered architect in South Australia.
- Eva Buhrich (1915–1976), architect, editor and writer who migrated from Germany
- Karen Burns (born 1962), architectural historian, theorist, activist and educator
- Stroma Buttrose (1929–2020), first female Planning Assistant in South Australia
- Kerry Clare, architect and joint recipient of the Australian Institute of Architects Gold Medal
- Justine Clark, New Zealand-born architectural editor, writer, speaker and researcher
- Louise Cox (born 1939), architect, Officer of the Order of Australia for services to architecture
- Eleanor Cullis-Hill (1913–2001), Sydney architect
- Suzanne Dance, Melbourne-based architect
- Maggie Edmond (born 1946), principal at Melbourne-based Edmond and Corrigan
- Rosina Edmunds (1900–1956), architect, urban planner and writer
- Harriet Edquist (born 1940s), architectural historian, educator and writer
- Zahava Elenberg (born 1973), co-director of Elenberg Fraser
- Cassandra Fahey (born ca. 1972), architect and interior designer
- Elizabeth Farrelly (born 1957), architecture critic, author and columnist
- Margaret Feilman (1921–2013), Perth architect and town planner
- Margaret Findlay (1916–2007), first female in Tasmania to qualify as an associate of the Royal Australian Institute of Architects
- Abbie Galvin (born 1970), principal of BVN Architecture
- Jill Garner, principal of Garner Davis, Associate Government Architect, Office of the Victorian Government Architect
- Eli Giannini (born 1956), architect; director of McGauran Giannini Soon; Life Fellow of the Australian Institute of Architects
- Eileen Good (1893–1986), Australia's first female architecture academic
- Elizabeth Grant (born 1963), architectural anthropologist, research in indigenous architecture
- Kristin Green, director of KGA Architecture
- Marion Mahony Griffin (1871–1961), one of the first registered female architects in the world
- Winsome Hall Andrew (1905–1997)
- Laura Harding (born 1975), practitioner and critic
- Ellison Harvie (1902–1984), first Australian woman to graduate with a Diploma of Architectural Design; first female Fellow of the Royal Victorian Institute of Architects; first woman elected to an Australian Architectural Institute council; first Australian woman to become a partner in a large firm
- Beatrice Hutton (1893–1990), first female architect accepted into an Institute of Architects in Australia
- Sandra Kaji-O'Grady, professor and head of architecture at the University of Queensland
- Louise St John Kennedy (born 1950), practices in Claremont, Western Australia
- Helen Lochhead, architect and urban designer
- Ruth Lucas (1924–2001), works with her husband Bill Lucas, known for the Glass House in Castlecrag, New South Wales
- Kirsteen Mackay, South Australian Government architect
- Gill Matthewson, academic, researcher and architect
- Nellie McCredie (1903–1968), Australian architect and potter
- Alison Mears, dean of the School of Design Strategies at Parsons The New School for Design
- Margaret Pitt Morison (1900–1985), early female architect in Western Australia
- Elina Mottram (1903–1996), British-born, Queensland's first and longest practicing female architect
- Phyllis Murphy (1924–2004), architect known for the 1956 Olympic Pool in Melbourne (with John Murphy) along with conservation projects
- Andrea Nield (born 1951), founded Emergency Architects Australia
- Rachel Nolan (born 1974), a founding director of Kennedy Nolan, a Melbourne-based practice
- Ellice Nosworthy (1897–1972), early female architect in New South Wales
- Alexis Ord, architect, activist and Melbourne's first female Lord Mayor
- Shelley Penn (born 1965), architect, urbanist and advocate
- Christine Phillips, academic, architect, advocate
- Susan Phillips (born 1958), award-winning second-generation architect based in Adelaide
- Caroline Pidcock (born 1962), advocate of sustainable development, based in Sydney
- Dimity Reed (born 1942), first female president of Royal Australian Institute of Architects (Victoria); founding member of the Association of Women in Architecture
- Sarah Lynn Rees, indigenous Australian architect
- Louise St John Kennedy (born 1950), West Australian architect, recipient of the 1984 Robin Boyd Award
- Felicity D. Scott (born 1965), academic, critic, and writer; Columbia University architecture professor
- Penelope Seidler (born 1938), director of Sydney-based Harry Seidler and associates
- Mary Turner Shaw (1906–1990), pioneering female architect
- Naomi Stead (born 1975), architectural academic, critic and writer
- Muriel Stott (1889–1985), probably the first woman with her own architectural firm in Australia
- Florence Mary Taylor (1879–1969), born in England but emigrated as a child; Australia's first qualified female architect
- Jennifer Taylor (1935–2015), architect, professor, critic and author
- Cynthia Teague MBE (1906–2007), pioneering Australian architect and public servant
- Kerstin Thompson (born 1965), Melbourne-based architect; professor of design at Victoria University of Wellington, New Zealand
- Yvonne von Hartel (born 1943), co-founder of the urban planning firm Peckvonhartel
- Suzannah Waldron, a founding director of the Melbourne-based architectural practice Searle x Waldron
- Cindy Walters (born 1963), active in London at Walters & Cohen
- Emma Young (born 1971), director of Phooey

=== New Zealand ===
- Kate Beath (1882–1979), probably the first female architect in New Zealand
- Andrea Bell, founder of a firm and lecturer
- Felicity Brenchley, architect
- Justine Clark, New Zealand-born architectural editor, writer, speaker and researcher
- Mary Clemens de Lisle, New Zealand born architect
- Carinnya Feaunati, New Zealand born Samoan architect
- Julia Gatley, architect, educator, writer
- Jackie Gillies, specialist in heritage buildings and conservation architecture
- Lucy Greenish (1888–1976), first woman to be a Registered Architect in New Zealand
- Min Hall, first female architecture graduate at Victoria University of Wellington
- Dorita Hannah, architect, educator whose work spans the spatial, visual and performing arts
- Nicola Herbst, South African–New Zealand architect
- Charmaine 'Ilaiū Talei, architect, academic, including projects in many Pacific Islands
- Annette Jones (architect), New Zealand architect with Beca Group
- Judi Keith-Brown, architect
- Gill Matthewson (fl. from 1984), architect, educator, writer
- Joanna Merwood-Salisbury, architectural historian
- Margaret Munro (1914–2005) first woman to establish architectural career in Christchurch
- Nancy Northcroft (1913–1980) architect and town planner
- Sally Ogle, architect
- Yvette Overdyck, architect
- June Pallot (1953–2004), registered architect and professor of accounting
- Renate Prince (born 1929), German born, New Zealand trained architect. Also worked in the United Kingdom.
- Anne Salmond (architect), architect
- Lynda Simmons, architect, educator, writer
- Alison Sleigh (1898–1972), first New Zealand woman to attain membership of the Royal Institute of British Architects
- Kathy Waghorn, New Zealand academic
- Felicity Wallace, architect
- Dorothy Wills (1911–2007), second woman to be a Registered Architect in New Zealand
- Megan Wraight (1961–2020), New Zealand landscape architect

== Europe ==
=== Albania ===
- Valentina Pistoli (1928–1993), first Albanian female architect
- Doris Andoni (born 1961), architect and housing policy expert
- Vera Bushati (born 1946), architect, engineer, historian and professor

=== Austria ===
- Maria Auböck (born 1951), architect, educator, specializing in landscape architecture
- Ella Briggs (1880–1977), early Austrian female architect and interior decorator
- Margarete Schütte-Lihotzky (1897–2000), first Austrian female architect
- Lilia Skala (1896–1994), graduated in and practiced architecture before becoming an actress in the United States
- Laura P. Spinadel (born 1958), principal at BUSarchitektur
- Silja Tillner (born 1960), principal at Architekten Tillner & Willinger
- Liane Zimbler (1892–1987), possibly the first European woman to graduate in architecture, in Austria; practiced in the United States from 1938 to age 90

=== Belarus ===
- Lyubow Usava (1921–2015), state architect who helped restore the Minsk after WWII

=== Belgium ===
- Christine Conix (born 1955)
- Simone Guillissen (1916–1996), early female practitioner; built residential villas and a large sports centre
- Dita Roque-Gourary (1915–2010)

=== Bosnia and Herzegovina ===
- Dijana Alić, architect and academic living in Australia
- Vesna Bugarski (1930–1992), first female architect in Bosnia-Herzegovina
- Selma Harrington (born 1955), interior design, president of the Architects' Council of Europe

=== Bulgaria ===
- Victoria Angelova (1902–1947), built the first modern, national art gallery in the Balkans
- Milka Bliznakov (1927–2010), founder of the International Archive of Women in Architecture
- Maria Luisa Doseva-Georgieva (1894–1975), second licensed woman architect in Bulgaria (after Elena Markova, who did not practice after obtaining her license)
- Dina Stancheva (1925–2010), 1985 recipient of the Gold Badge of the Bulgarian Union of Architects

=== Croatia ===
- Rajka Vali (1926–2011), also pop singer

=== Czech Republic ===
- Eva Jiřičná (born 1939), moved from Czechoslovakia to London in 1968
- Věra Machoninová (born 1928)
- Milada Petříková-Pavlíková (1895–1985), first female architect in Czechoslovakia

=== Denmark ===
- Pia Bech Mathiesen (1962–2016), designer, executive, head of the Universe science amusement park
- Ellen Braae (born 1965), landscape architect, educator
- Karen Clemmensen (1917–2001), functionalist educational institutions
- Inger Exner (born 1926), partnership with her husband Johannes, churches and restoration
- Mette Kynne Frandsen (born 1960), CEO of Henning Larsen Architects
- Ragna Grubb (1903–1961), one of the first to have her own business
- Gunver Hansen (born 1943), architect specializing in lighting design
- Malene Hauxner (1942–2012), modernist landscape architecture
- Anna Maria Indrio (born 1943), architect with C. F. Møller
- Kristine Jensen (born 1956), landscape architect
- Helle Juul (born 1954), urban planning
- Bodil Kjær (born 1932), interior design and office furniture
- Hanne Kjærholm (1930–2009), own firm, professor at Danish Academy
- Signe Kongebro (born 1972), partner at Henning Larsen Architects with responsibility for sustainability
- Eva Koppel (1916–2006), Brutalist-style public buildings
- Mette Lange (graduated 1990), mobile schools for nomad children in Goa
- Dorte Mandrup-Poulsen (born 1961), own practice in Copenhagen
- Elna Møller (1913–1994), principal editor of Danmarks Kirker
- Lise Roel (1928–2017), based in Halmstad, Sweden
- Lene Tranberg (born 1956), since 2000 has designed high-profile buildings in Copenhagen
- Susanne Ussing (1940–1998), experimental approaches with new materials
- Lone Wiggers (born 1963), partner at C. F. Møller Architects

=== Estonia ===
- Yoko Alender (born 1979), architect, civil servant and politician
- Dora Gordine (1895–1991), Estonian-born sculptor, architect, active in England, remembered for Dorich House
- Katrin Koov (born 1973), large public projects since 2000
- Marika Lõoke (born 1951), office buildings
- Margit Mutso (born 1966), apartment buildings
- Erika Nõva (1905–1987), Estonia's first female architect
- Maarja Nummert (born 1944), schools
- Valve Pormeister (1922–2002), highly influential in Soviet era
- Mai Šein (born 1946), housing and university addition, has own business
- Hilda Taba (1902–1967), took up work in New York City because Tartu University would not employ a woman
- Meeli Truu (1946–2013), active in Tallinn
- Veronika Valk (born 1976), various large buildings, also lectures widely
- Siiri Vallner (born 1972), installations and various building projects

=== Finland ===
- Aino Aalto (1894–1949), first wife of Alvar Aalto using the Functionalist style, later turning to interiors
- Elissa Aalto (1922–1994), second wife of Alvar Aalto, with whom she designed the opera house in Essen
- Elsa Arokallio (1892–1982), after her husband died, ran her own business
- Elsi Borg (1893–1958), after graduating in 1919, designed a hospital and a church
- Elna Kiljander (1889–1970), early female architect active in Functionalism
- Saija Hollmén (born 1970), founding partner of Hollmén Reuter Sandman
- Hilda Hongell (1867–1952), possibly the first woman in Finland to run her own practice
- Signe Hornborg (1862–1916), possibly the first qualified female architect in the world
- Eva Kuhlefelt-Ekelund (1892–1984), pioneering Finnish architect and wife of architect Hilding Ekelund
- Kristiina Lassus (born 1966), designer
- Wivi Lönn (1872–1966), several notable buildings; first woman to be granted title of professor by Finnish Association
- Martta Martikainen-Ypyä (1904–1992), designed many public buildings alone or with husband Ragnar Ypyä
- Raili Pietilä (1926–1993), closely cooperated with husband Reima Pietilä
- Jenni Reuter (born 1972), founding partner of Hollmén Reuter Sandman
- Helena Sandman (born 1972), founding partner of Hollmén Reuter Sandman
- Ebba-Stina Schalin-Hult (1913–1999), active in Stockholm
- Kaija Siren (1920–2001), worked with her husband Heikki Siren

=== France ===
- Katherine Briçonnet (ca. 1494–1526), supervised the construction of Château de Chenonceau
- Iwona Buczkowska (born 1953), award-winning architect and urban planner
- Georgette Cottin-Euziol (1926–2004) French Algerian architect, one of the first women architects in both countries
- Anne Debarre (born 1957), academic and researcher
- Odile Decq (born 1955), award-winning architect
- Anne Démians (born mid–1960s), established her own firm in Paris in 2004
- Elizabeth de Portzamparc, award-winning French-Brazilian architect
- Françoise Fromonot (born 1958), architectural critic
- Catherine Furet (born 1954), specializes in social housing
- Renée Gailhoustet (born 1929), social housing in Paris suburbs
- Manuelle Gautrand (born 1961), versatile modern architect working in many areas
- Dominique Gauzin-Müller (born 1960), architect and architectural critic
- Édith Girard (1949–2014), practicing architect in the area of social housing
- Pascale Guédot (born 1960), awarded the Prix de l'Équerre d'Argent
- Solange d'Herbez de la Tour (born 1924)
- Françoise-Hélène Jourda (1955–2015), educator and proponent of sustainable architecture
- Anne Lacaton (born 1955), architect and educator, co-founder of Lacaton & Vassal
- Marine Miroux (born 1977), architect working in Berlin
- Charlotte Perriand (1903–1999), visionary designer and architect who inspired Le Corbusier
- Edith Schreiber-Aujame (1919–1998), Franco-American architect and urban planner
- Marion Tournon-Branly (1924–2016)
- Corinne Vezzoni (born 1964), awarded the Prix Femmes Architectes

=== Germany ===
- Elisabeth von Baczko (1868–1941), architecture, furniture, and interior design
- Karola Bloch (1905–1994), emigrated to Vienna, Paris, Prague and New York before returning to Germany
- Elisabeth Böhm (1921–2012), wife of the better known Gottfried Böhm
- Eva Buhrich (1915–1976), architectural commentator in Australia
- Brigitte D'Ortschy (1921–1990), architect, journalist, Zen master
- Kristin Feireiss (born 1942), architect, curator, writer, active in the Netherlands
- Charlotte Frank (born 1959), partner with Axel Schultes, Berlin
- Dörte Gatermann (born 1956), Triangle Tower in Cologne
- Anna Heringer (born 1977), award-winning proponent of sustainable architecture
- Lucy Hillebrand (1906–1997), latterly educational buildings
- Margrit Kennedy (1939–2013), specializing in ecological building techniques
- Anna Klingmann (born 1965), theorist of brandism, the connection of branding and architecture
- Sigrid Kressmann-Zschach (1929–1990), first shopping mall in Germany
- Brigitte Peterhans (born 1928), worked on many renowned buildings internationally, including the Sears Tower, Chicago
- Lilly Reich (1885–1947), Bauhaus-trained, modernist designer, interior architect
- Lou Scheper-Berkenkamp (1901–1976), Bauhaus-trained, architectural colorist
- Thekla Schild (1890–1991), Germany's second female architectural graduate
- Barbara Schock-Werner (born 1947), Cologne Cathedral
- Maria Schwarz (1921–2018), architect best known for designing churches
- Annabelle Selldorf (born early 1960s), founded her own agency in New York
- Lotte Stam-Beese (1903–1988), Bauhaus-trained, helped with the post-war reconstruction of Rotterdam
- Judith Stolzer-Segall (1904–1990), first female architect to design a synagogue
- Gerdy Troost (1904–2003), Nazi architecture projects
- Emilie Winkelmann (1875–1951), Germany's first independent female architect

=== Greece ===
- Souzána Antonakáki (1935–2020), founder of Atelier 66 in Athens
- Alexandra Paschalidou-Moreti (1912–2010), designed pavilions for international exhibitions
- Rena Sakellaridou (born 1955), cofounded the Greek architecture firm SPARCH; author, and professor of Architectural Design at The Aristotle University of Thessaloniki

=== Hungary ===
- Eva Vecsei (born 1930), see Canada

=== Iceland ===
- Högna Sigurðardóttir (1929–2017), first woman to design a building in Iceland

=== Ireland ===
- Angela Brady (born c. 1957), elected president of the UK's Royal Institute of British Architects in 2011
- Yvonne Farrell (born 1951), co-founder of award-winning Grafton Architects in Dublin
- Eileen Gray (1878–1976), lived and worked primarily in France
- Selma Harrington (born 1955), see Bosnia and Herzegovina
- Róisín Heneghan, co-founder of Heneghan Peng Architects
- Shelley McNamara (born 1952), co-founder of award-winning Grafton Architects in Dublin
- Caroline O'Donnell (born c. 1974), winner of MoMA PS1 Young Architects Program (New York) 2013
- Sheila O'Donnell (born 1953), co-founder of O’Donnell + Tuomey Architects; designed several award-winning buildings around Dublin

=== Italy ===
- Paola Antonelli (born 1963), senior curator of the Department of Architecture & Design at the Museum of Modern Art (MoMA), New York City
- Gae Aulenti (1927–2012), architect, interior designer and industrial designer
- Lina Bo Bardi (1914–1992), moved to Brazil after the war and became a naturalized Brazilian citizen
- Cini Boeri (1924–2020), architect, interior designer and industrial designer
- Plautilla Bricci (1616–1690), architect and painter in and near Rome
- Ada Bursi (1906–1996), architect and designer
- Maria Hadfield Cosway (1760–1838), amateur architect, patron, and painter
- Anna Castelli Ferrieri (1918–2006), architect and industrial designer
- Alessandra Cianchetta (born 1971), founding partner of AWP Paris, large-scale urban redevelopment
- Silvana De Stefano, architect and sculptor
- Stefania Filo Speziale (1905–1988), first woman to graduate from an architecture program in Naples
- Marta Maccaglia (born 1983), founder of Asociación Semillas in Peru and winner of the 2023 Diversity in Architecture Award.
- Doriana Mandrelli Fuksas (born 1944), founding partner of Fuksas Studio in Rome
- Giulia Guarino (1897–1985), Italian/Uruguayan architect, first Latin American woman to graduate with a degree in architecture in 1923
- Franca Helg (1920–1989), architect and designer
- Anna Maria Indrio (born 1943), see Denmark
- Elena Luzzatto (1900–1983), first woman to graduate from an architecture program in Italy
- Rosaria Piomelli (born 1937), architect and academic
- Teresa Sapey (born 1962), own studio in Madrid, also academic
- Afra Scarpa (1937–2011), of Afra and Tobia Scarpa
- Benedetta Tagliabue (born 1963), based in Barcelona, Spain
- Attilia Vaglieri (1891–1969), Italian architect and urban planner
- Paola Viganò (born 1961), awarded a Gold Medal for Italian Architecture for her career in 2018
- Lella Vignelli (1934–2016), architect and designer
- Lauretta Vinciarelli (1943–2011), artist, architect, educator
- Raffaella Laezza (born 1961), architect and academic

=== Luxembourg ===
- Tatiana Fabeck (born 1970), large-scale university development
- Arlette Schneiders (born late 1950s), first woman in Luxembourg to have her own firm

=== Malta ===
- Isabelle Barratt-Delia (born 1938), first Maltese female architect

=== Montenegro ===
- Svetlana Kana Radević (1937–2000), first Montenegrin female architect

=== Netherlands ===
- Fleur Agema (born 1976), politician, former spatial designer
- Caroline Bos (born 1959), co-founder of UNStudio, an award-winning architecture firm in Amsterdam
- Luzia Hartsuyker-Curjel (1926–2011), German-born Dutch architect remembered for her innovative housing designs
- Francine Houben (born 1955), founding partner of Mecanoo; visiting professor at Harvard University
- Afaina de Jong (born 1977), researcher and founder of AFARAI
- Barbara Kuit (born 1998), co-founder of Information Based Architecture
- Judith Ledeboer (1901–1990), see United Kingdom
- Han Schröder (1918–1992), after establishing her own firm in Amsterdam, emigrated to the United States where she taught interior design
- Margaret Staal-Kropholler (1891–1966), first woman architect in the Netherlands
- Nathalie de Vries (born 1965), co-founder of MVRDV
- Tonny Zwollo (born 1942), built 35 schools in Oaxaca, Mexico, and the largest open-air market in South America, in Ecuador
- Liesbeth van der Pol (born 1959), co-founder of Dok architecten

=== Norway ===
- Kari Nissen Brodtkorb (born 1942), architect and educator, Houen Foundation Award for Stranden housing complex in Oslo
- Lilla Hansen (1872–1962), Norway's first female architect
- Kristin Jarmund (born 1954), runs her own business, Kristin Jarmund Arkitekter
- Ingeborg Krafft (1902–1963), designed Mesnali Church
- Maja Melandsø (1906–1981), early Norwegian female architect
- Hjørdis Grøntoft Raknerud (1878–1918), early Norwegian female architect
- Kirsten Sand (1895–1996), first woman to graduate in architecture from the Norwegian Institute of Technology
- Wenche Selmer (1920–1998), specialized in timber residential projects in the south of Norway
- Kirsten Sinding-Larsen (1898–1978), designed Sunnaas Hospital

=== Poland ===
- Barbara Bielecka (born 1931), designed the Basilica of Our Lady of Licheń, Poland's largest church
- Karola Bloch (1905–1994), worked in Austria, the United States and Germany
- Barbara Brukalska (1899–1980), Functionalist architect, educator
- Adrienne Górska (1899–1969), Russian-born Polish architect working in Paris
- Zofia Garlińska-Hansen (1924–2013), architect who worked in Poland with husband Oskar Hansen
- Jadwiga Grabowska-Hawrylak (1920–2018), first woman to be awarded the Honorary Award of the Association of Polish Architects (SARP)
- Marya Lilien (1900/1901–1998), architect and university professor, the first woman architect to apprentice under Frank Lloyd Wright
- Helena Syrkus (1900–1982), architect, urban planner and professor, an editor of Athens Charter

=== Portugal ===
- Maria José Marques da Silva (1914–1996), first female architecture graduate from Porto's School of Fine Arts
- Ana Louisa Soares (born 1988), architect, own practice

=== Romania ===
- Maria Cotescu (1896–1980), one of the first women architects of Romania; built the National railway industrial complex
- Henrieta Delavrancea (1897–1987), one of the first female architects admitted to the Superior School of Architecture in Bucharest
- Virginia Andreescu Haret (1894–1962), first female graduate in architecture and first female Romanian Architectural Inspector General
- Anca Petrescu (1949–2013), architect and politician

=== Russia ===
- Nina Aleshina (1924–2012), designer of 19 stations of the Moscow Metro and head of the Metrogiprotrans design department, 1981–1991
- Galina Balashova (born 1931), architect and designer associated with the Soviet space program
- Adrienne Górska (1899–1969), born in Moscow of Polish extraction, early female graduate in Paris (1924) where she worked in the Art Deco style
- Tamara Katsenelenbogen (1894–1976), constructivist architect and urban planner
- Dita Roque-Gourary (1915–2010), see Belgium
- Rachel Bernstein Wischnitzer (1885–1989), born in the Russian Empire, moved to the U.S. in 1940

=== Serbia ===
- Ksenija Bulatović (born 1967), educational and commercial buildings, also academic
- Jelisaveta Načić (1878–1955), first female architect in Serbia
- Jovanka Bončić-Katerinić (1887–1966), first woman engineer in Germany
- Ljiljana Bakić (1939–2022), designed the award-winning Aleksandar Nikolić Hall
- Ivanka Raspopović (1930–2015), designed the award-winning Museum of Contemporary Art
- Milica Šterić (1914–1998), head of Energoprojekt’s architecture department
- Maja Vidaković Lalić (born 1972), designed the Supermarket Store in Belgrade, founder of the Mikser Festival
- Olja Ivanjicki (1931–2009), artist in sculpture, poetry, design, architecture and writing
- Dubravka Sekulić (born 1980), architectural researcher and theorist

=== Slovenia ===
- Sonja Lapajne Oblak (1906–1993), architect, first Slovenian woman to graduate as a civil engineer, Slovenia's first female urban planner.
- Marjetica Potrč (born 1953), installations, research

=== Spain ===
- Roser Amadó (born 1944), architect working in Barcelona
- Margarita Brender Rubira (1919–2002), Romanian-born architect active in Barcelona
- Lucía Cano Pintos (born 1965), cofounded the Madrid studio SelgasCano
- Ángela García de Paredes (born 1958), co-founded the Paredes Pedrosa studio
- Matilde Ucelay Maortúa (1912–2008), first woman licensed in architecture in Spain
- Fuensanta Nieto (born 1957), partner of Nieto Sobejano Arquitectos
- Marina Otero (born 1981), architect, researcher and 2022 Wheelwright Prize winner
- Carme Pigem (born 1962), member of the Pritzker Prize-winning architectural firm RCR Arquitectes
- Carme Pinós (born 1954), founder of Estudio Carme Pinós.
- Anna Puigjaner (born 1980), architect, editor and 2016 Wheelwright Prize winner
- Beatriz Ramo (born 1979), Spanish architect working in Rotterdam
- Benedetta Tagliabue (born 1963), see Italy
- Patricia Urquiola (born 1961), working in Milan, Italy since 1990
- Elisa Valero (born 1971), architect and professor

=== Sweden ===
- Anna Branzell (1895–1983), Norwegian-born Swedish architect, first woman to graduate in architecture in Sweden
- Léonie Geisendorf (1914–2016), Polish-born Swedish architect working in Stockholm
- Mia Hägg (born 1970), her firm, Habiter Autrement, is based in Paris
- Margit Hall (1901–1937), first woman in Sweden to graduate in architecture as an ordinary student
- Agnes Magnell (1878–1966), first woman accepted to the architecture program at the Royal Institute of Technology; was not allowed to graduate since she was accepted on exception; designed the water tower in Sala in 1903
- Greta Magnusson-Grossman (1906–1999), furniture designer and architect
- Pernilla Ohrstedt (born 1980), London-based Swedish architect
- Brita Snellman (1901–1978), first woman to graduate in architecture at the Royal Institute of Technology, in 1924
- Hillevi Svedberg (1910–1990), remembered for collective housing interiors
- Inga Varg (born 1952), urban planning, interior design and architecture
- Ingeborg Wærn Bugge (1899–1991), early Swedish graduate, residential buildings, schools, renovation

=== Switzerland ===
- Angela Deuber (born 1975), architect, educator
- Annette Gigon (born 1959), architect, educator
- Lux Guyer (1894–1955), architect behind the SAFFA women's fair in Bern
- Inès Lamunière (born 1954), architect, educator, editor
- Gret Loewensberg (born 1943), works in domestic architecture
- Berta Rahm (1910–1998), architect, writer, publisher
- Flora Ruchat-Roncati (1937–2012), first woman professor and chair of Architecture and Design at ETH Zurich
- Flora Steiger-Crawford (1899–1991), first Swiss woman to graduate in architecture

=== Turkey ===
- Leman Tomsu (1913–1988), one of the first Turkish women to qualify as an architect in 1934

=== United Kingdom ===
- Norah Aiton (1903–1988), early modernist architect
- Jill Allibone (1932–1998), architectural historian, founder of the Mausolea and Monuments Trust
- Julia Barfield (born 1952), co-founder of Marks Barfield Architects with David Marks; known for designing the London Eye
- Margaret Justin Blanco White (1911–2001), Scottish modernist architect, was awarded an OBE in 1973
- Teresa Borsuk (born 1956), winner of Architects' Journal Woman Architect of the Year 2015
- Isobel Hogg Kerr Beattie (1900–1970), perhaps the first female architect in regular practice in Scotland
- Elisabeth Benjamin (1908–1999), first generation of British female architects
- Corinne Bennett (1935–2010), conservation and cathedral architect
- Jos Boys
- Elizabeth Cadbury-Brown (1922–2002), American-born architect working in London with her husband H. T. Cadbury-Brown
- Ethel Charles (1871–1962), first woman to be admitted to RIBA
- Elizabeth Chesterton (1915–2002), architect and town planner
- Catherine Cooke (1942–2004), academic and writer on Russian architecture
- Dame Sylvia Crowe (1901–1997), landscape architect
- Dame Jane Drew (1911–1996), architect, town planner, proponent of modernism
- Jane Duncan (born 1953), RIBA President-elect (2014)
- Kathryn Findlay (1954–2014), worked in Japan 1979 to 1999, before returning to the UK
- Wendy Foster (1937–1989), co-founder of Team 4 and Foster Associates
- Dame Zaha Hadid (1950–2016), see Iraq
- Susannah Hagan (born 1951), educator, Royal College of Art School of Architecture
- Diane Haigh (1949–2022), conservation architect
- Edith Gillian Harrison (1898–1974), one of the first four women students to graduate from the Architectural Association School of Architecture
- Rachel Haugh, co-founder of SimpsonHaugh and Partners
- Patty Hopkins (born 1942), Royal Gold Medal winner
- Edith Hughes (1888–1971), probably Britain's first female practising architect
- Louisa Hutton (born 1957), co-founder of Sauerbruch Hutton
- Eva Jiřičná (born 1939), see Czech Republic
- Judith Ledeboer (1901–1990), designed schools, universities and public housing
- Gertrude Leverkus (1899–1976), German-born architect
- Amanda Levete (born 1955), co-founder of Future Systems, head of AL A
- Sara Losh (1785–1853), architect of St Mary's Church, Wreay, Cumbria, 1840–42
- Kate Macintosh (born 1937), designed public housing in London
- Kirsteen Mackay, in 2015 appointed South Australian Government Architect
- Mary Medd (1907–2005), public buildings including schools
- Elsie Owusu, Ghana-born architect, first chair of the Society of Black Architects
- Marian Pepler (1904–1997), architect, rug designer
- Margaret Richards (1928–2022), Scottish architect
- Matrix Feminist Design Co-operative (1980–1984)
- Monica Pidgeon (1913–2009), interior designer, Honorary Fellow of the RIBA, AIA and Architectural Association
- Ruth Reed, first female president of the Royal Institute of British Architects, 2009–2011
- Su Rogers (née Brumwell, born 1939), founding member of Team 4 and co-designer of the Centre Georges Pompidou
- Diana Rowntree (1915–2008), architectural writer
- Nathalie Rozencwajg (born 1975), co-founder of RARE Architecture
- Winifred Ryle (1897–1987), early female student at the Architectural Association School of Architecture
- Flora Samuel, head of the School of Architecture at Sheffield University since 2009
- Deborah Saunt, co-founder of DSHDA in London
- Elisabeth Scott (1898–1972), first woman architect to win an international architecture competition
- Alison Smithson (1928–1993), practitioner of Brutalist architecture
- Rosemary Stjernstedt (1912–1998), designed public housing in London
- Sarah Susanka (born 1957), best known for her Not So Big books
- Mary Townley (1753–1839), of Ramsgate; pupil of Joshua Reynolds; designer of Townley House
- Jane Wernick (born 1954), architect, educator, associated with the London Eye
- Sarah Wigglesworth, founder of Sarah Wigglesworth Architects; multi-RIBA Award winner; Professor of Architecture at Sheffield University
- Lady Elizabeth Wilbraham (1632–1705), probably the first known female architect
- Georgie Wolton (1934–2021), founding member of Team 4

== North America ==
=== Belize ===
- Esther Ayuso (born 1958), first female architect of Belize, born in Venezuela; specializes in hospital design
- Sue Courtenay (born c. 1966), first female president of the Federation of Caribbean Association of Architects

=== Canada ===
- Alexandra Biriukova (1895–1967), first woman to register with the Ontario Association of Architects
- Shirley Blumberg (born 1952), founding partner of KPMB Architects
- Giovanna Borasi (born 1971), Italian-born Canadian architect, curator of the Canadian Centre for Architecture
- Alison Brooks (born 1962), moved to the UK in 1989; Stirling Prize winner 2008
- Pamela Cluff (1931–2023), accessibility design
- Teresa Coady (born 1956), sustainability and energy-saving design
- Marie-Chantal Croft (born c. 1970), Quebec architect
- Beatrice Centner Davidson (1909–1986), Toronto architect
- Blanche Lemco van Ginkel (1923–2022), Modernist architect
- Lennox Grafton (1919–2017), design and project architect for the Government of Canada
- Jean Hall (1896–1982), B. Arch. University of Toronto, 1923, first Canadian-trained female architect to design a building in Canada
- Esther Hill (1895–1983), first female architect to graduate in Canada, from University of Toronto in 1920
- Barbara Humphreys (died 2017), architect and author, specializing in public service, historic preservation, and housing
- Lily Inglis (1926–2010), Italian-born Canadian architect
- Phyllis Lambert (born 1927), architect and philanthropist
- Martha Stewart Leitch (1918–2015) (fl. 2006), Toronto architect, Fellow of the RAIC
- Elizabeth Lord, B. Arch. University of Manitoba, (graduated 1939); first woman to register with the Manitoba Association of Architects
- Janet Leys Shaw Mactavish (1925–1972), university buildings
- Alice Malhiot (1889–1968), first Canadian woman to receive a diploma in architecture
- Marianne McKenna (born 1950), founding partner of KPMB Architects
- Cornelia Oberlander (1921–2021), landscape architect
- Mother Joseph Pariseau (1823–1902), religious sister who designed buildings in the state of Washington
- Patricia Patkau (born 1950), architect and founder of Patkau Architects
- Helga Plumb (born 1939), Austrian-born architect and design critic
- Susan M. Ross (born 1963), Quebec architect and author, specializing in heritage conservation
- Brigitte Shim (born 1958), born in Jamaica, founding partner of Shim-Sutcliffe Architects; tenured professor at the University of Toronto's John H. Daniels Faculty of Architecture
- Eva Vecsei (born 1930), Hungarian-born architect active in Montreal
- Catherine Mary Wisnicki (1919–2014)

=== Cuba ===
- María Margarita Egaña Fernández (1921–1975), Cuban modernist architect

=== Dominican Republic ===
- Margot Taule (1920–2008), first registered professional engineer and architect in the Dominican Republic

=== Jamaica ===
- Nadine Isaacs (1942–2004), first female head of the Jamaican Institute of Architects and Caribbean School of Architecture
- Verma Panton (1936–2015), first female architect of Jamaica and of the Anglo-Caribbean

=== Mexico ===
- Tatiana Bilbao (born 1972), best known for the Botanical Garden of Sinaloa in Culiacán
- Clara de Buen Richkarday (born 1954), metro stations in Mexico City
- Gabriela Carrillo, partner of the practice Taller Rocha + Carillo
- Fernanda Canales (born 1974), architect, designer, curator
- Frida Escobedo (born 1979), architect best known for the 2018 Serpentine Pavilion, and La Tallera Siquieros in Cuernavaca.
- María Luisa Dehesa Gómez Farías (1912–2009), first female architecture graduate in Mexico and Latin America
- Laura Itzel Castillo (born 1957), architect, politician
- Ruth Rivera Marín (1927–1969), first female graduate of College of Engineering and Architecture at the National Polytechnic Institute
- Beatriz Peschard (born 1970), architect, editor, and partner of Bernardi + Peschard Arquitectura
- Teresa Táboas (born 1961), architect, professor and Galician politician
- Sara Topelson de Grinberg (born 1945), educational, commercial, and cultural buildings; professor

=== Puerto Rico ===
- Beatriz del Cueto (born 1952 in Havana), conservation, academic

=== United States ===
This list of United States women architects includes notable women architects with a strong connection to the United States, i.e. born in the US, located in the US, or known primarily for their work in the USA.

==== A ====
- Constance Abernathy (1931–1994), architectural collaborator with Buckminster Fuller
- Ruth Maxon Adams (1883–1970), designer for Yelping Hill, Connecticut
- Diana Agrest (born 1945), architect and urban designer in New York City
- Nellie B. Allen (1874–1961), landscape architect known for her knot gardens
- Rachel Allen (born 1970), architect based in Los Angeles
- Mary Almy (1883–1976), one of three women who founded Howe, Manning & Almy, Inc. in Boston, Massachusetts
- Lavone Dickensheets Andrews (1912–2002), architect in Texas
- Kathryn H. Anthony, architect, educator, writer
- Paola Antonelli (born 1963), see Italy
- Mai Arbegast (1992–2012), landscape architect, educator
- Alice Constance Austin (1868–ca. 1930), designed houses to reduce domestic labor so as to promote gender equality
- Violeta Autumn (1930–2012), Peruvian-born, Sausalito, California architect and city councilwoman
- Elizabeth Ayer (1897–1987), pioneering woman architect in Seattle, Washington

==== B ====
- Agnes Ballard (1877–1969), Florida's first registered woman architect and first woman AIA
- Diana Balmori (1932–2016), landscape and urban designer
- Julie Bargmann (born 1958), landscape architect, educator
- Carol Ross Barney (born 1949), founder of Ross Barney Architects, 1981
- Nora Barney (1883–1971), civil engineer, architect and suffragist
- Katherine Bashford (1885–1953), landscape architect active in Southern California
- Karen Bausman (born 1958), taught at both Harvard University and Yale University
- Ann Beha (born 1950), Boston architect
- Laura Bennett (born 1963), architect and fashion designer
- Deborah Berke (born 1954), founder of Deborah Berke & Partners Architects in New York City
- Barbara Bestor (born 1969), active in Los Angeles, California
- Louise Blanchard Bethune (1856–1948), first American woman known to have worked as a professional architect
- Rebecca L. Binder (born 1951), architect, designer, and educator, who was named a Fellow of the American Institute of Architects
- Phyllis Birkby (1932–1994), practicing architect, educator and proponent of women's role in architecture
- Norma Bonniwell (1877–1961), worked with her father in North Carolina
- India Boyer (1907–1998), first female architect in Ohio
- Louise Braverman (born 1948), New York-based architect who is a Fellow of the American Institute of Architects
- Lilian Bridgman (1866–1948), active in California after World War I
- Cornelia Brierly (1913–2012), worked with Frank Lloyd Wright
- Sara Bronin, architect and historic preservationist
- Angela Brooks, co-founder of Brooks + Scarpa in Los Angeles, California
- Elizabeth Carter Brooks (1867–1951), African American architect, educator and activist
- Ebba Wicks Brown (1914–2006), architect in Astoria, Oregon
- Daphne Brown (1948–2011), highly acclaimed Alaskan architect
- Debra M. Brown (born 1963), judge, worked as an architect in Washington, D.C.
- Denise Scott Brown (born 1931), see Zambia
- Lori Brown (born 1969), co-founder of ArchiteXX, educator
- Emma Brunson (1887–1980), opened her own firm in Minnesota
- Cory Buckner, restoration architect in Los Angeles, California
- Katharine Budd (1860–1951), pioneering woman architect admitted to the AIA in 1924 after practicing for 30 years
- Pamela Burton (born 1948), landscape architect
- Emily Helen Butterfield (1884–1958), Michigan's first licensed female architect

==== C ====
- Elizabeth Cadbury-Brown (1922–2002), American-born architect who practiced in New York and London
- Alma Carlisle (born 1927), African American architect who helped preserve historic structures in Los Angeles, California
- Alberta Jeannette Cassell (1926–2007), African American architect who worked for the U.S. Navy
- Olive Chadeayne (1904–2001), architect, specifications writer
- Judith Chafee (1932–1988), architect, educator, residential buildings in Arizona
- Josephine Wright Chapman (1867–1943), active in Boston, Massachusetts
- Annie Chu, Chinese American architect and educator in Los Angeles, California
- Jane West Clauss (1907–2003), architect and educator
- Elizabeth Close (1912–2011), pioneering female architect in Minneapolis, Minnesota
- Rose Connor (1892–1970), early woman architect in Pasadena, California
- Marian Cruger Coffin (1876–1957), pioneering landscape architect
- Elisabeth Coit (1897–1987), own firm in New York City
- Doris Cole (born 1938), co-founder of Cole and Goyette, Architects and Planners in Cambridge, Massachusetts, Massachusetts
- Melissa Minnich Coleman (1917–2014), active in Pennsylvania, specialized in school buildings
- Mary Colter (1869–1958), chief architect of the Fred Harvey Company
- Lise Anne Couture (born 1959), co-founder of Asymptote Architecture
- Dana Hudkins Crawford (born 1931), architectural conservation developer and preservationist for Downtown Denver, Colorado
- Mary Ann Crawford (1901–1988), architect in Illinois
- Dana Cuff, architecture theorist and educator and founder of CityLab

==== D ====
- Mary Lund Davis (1922–1998), modernist architect from the Pacific Northwest
- Helen Sellers Davis (1912–2008), architect in Alabama
- Natalie Griffin de Blois (1921–2013), partner for many years in the architectural firm of Skidmore, Owings and Merrill
- Edna Deakin (1871–1946), considered one of the earliest American women architects
- Peggy Deamer (born 1950), architect, educator, principal at Deamer, Architects
- Katherine Diamond (born 1954), first woman to be president of the Los Angeles chapter of the AIA
- Elizabeth Diller (born 1954), co-founder of Diller Scofidio + Renfro in 1979
- Julia Lester Dillon (1871–1959), Georgia landscape architect and columnist
- Betsey Doughtery, California architect, recipient of AIACC Lifetime Achievement Award, 2017
- Henrietta Dozier (1872–1947), first female architect in Georgia
- Winka Dubbeldam (born 1966), Dutch-born American architect active in New York City
- Ena Dubnoff, Southern California architect

==== E ====
- Tammy Eagle Bull, architect
- Ray Eames (1912–1988)
- Keller Easterling (born 1959), architect, urbanist and writer
- Judith Edelman (1923–2014), co-founder of Edelman Sultan Knox Wood/Architects
- Merrill Elam, active in Atlanta, Georgia, co-founded her own firm in 1984
- Dora Epstein-Jones, educator, theorist and curator

==== F ====
- Beatrix Farrand (1872–1959), landscape architect
- Jessica Farrar (born 1966)
- Roberta M. Feldman, educator, University of Illinois, Chicago
- Katherine Cutler Ficken (1911–1968), first licensed female architect in Maryland (1936)
- Elizabeth Hirsh Fleisher (1892–1975), first registered female architect in Philadelphia
- Jean B. Fletcher (1915–1965), founding member of the Architects' Collaborative
- Helen Liu Fong (1927–2005), Chinese-American architect and interior designer who practiced in Los Angeles, California
- Anne Fougeron (born 1955), active in California
- Ruth Reynolds Freeman (1913–1969), architect in Vermont
- Helen French (1900–1994), latterly based in San Francisco
- Margaret Fritsch (1899–1993), first female architect in Oregon
- Ethel Furman (1899–1993), earliest African American female architect in Virginia

==== G ====
- Jeanne Gang (born 1964), award-winning leader of Studio Gang Architects
- Mary Gannon (1867–1932), co-founder of Gannon and Hands
- Carolyn Geise (born 1935), Seattle-based architect
- Elsa Gidoni (1901–1978), German-born architect and interior designer
- Madeline Gins (1941–2014), collaborated with Shusaku Arakawa on the Mechanism of Meaning
- Joan E. Goody (1935–2009), modern architecture in Boston
- Lois Gottlieb (1926–2018), one of the five women featured in the documentary A girl is a fellow here
- Greta Gray (1880–1961), architect, home economist, academic
- Rose Greely (1887–1969), first licensed female architect in Washington, D.C.
- Beverly Loraine Greene (1915–1957), first registered African American female architect in the US
- Marion Mahony Griffin (1871–1961), one of the first licensed female architects in the world

==== H ====
- Leola Hall (1881–1930), first female architect in Berkeley, California
- Frances Halsband (born 1943), AIA design committee
- Alice Hands, co-founder of Gannon and Hands
- Sarah P. Harkness (1914–2013), president of the Boston Society of Architects
- Georgia Louise Harris Brown (1918–1999), second African American woman to become a licensed architect in the United States
- Jane Hastings (1928–2024), in Seattle; first female chancellor of the AIA College of Fellows
- Sophia Hayden (1868–1953), Chilean-born American architect, first woman architecture graduate from MIT, best known for designing the Woman's Building at the World's Columbian Exposition
- Margo Hebald-Heymann, 1960s graduate, contributed to Terminal One, Los Angeles International Airport
- Margaret Helfand (1947–2007), own firm in New York City
- Edith Henderson (1911–2005), landscape architect
- Frances Henley (1896–1955), early female architect in Rhode Island
- Margaret Hicks (1858–1883)
- E. E. Holman (1854–1925) (aka Emily Elizabeth Holman) (fl. 1892–1915), early female architect in Pennsylvania
- Victorine du Pont Homsey (1900–1998), founding partner in the firm of Victorine & Samuel Homsey
- Mary Rockwell Hook (1877–1978), denied admission to AIA due to her gender
- Lois Howe (1864–1964), founder of the all female firm in Boston, Howe, Manning & Almy, Inc.
- Elinor Mead Howells (1837–1910), artist, architect, aristocrat
- Ada Louise Huxtable (1921–2013), architecture critic
- Joyce Hwang, architect and urban planner

==== I ====
- Elizabeth Wright Ingraham (1922–2013), architect and granddaughter of Frank Lloyd Wright
- Harriet Morrison Irwin (1828–1897), early female architect from North Carolina
- Lisa Iwamoto, Japanese-American architect, co-founder of IwamotoScott, and associate professor at University of California, Berkeley.

==== J ====
- Mary Rutherfurd Jay (1872–1953), early landscape architect
- Alice E. Johnson (1862–1936), early architect from Ohio
- Jane Hall Johnson (1919–2001)
- Sharon Johnston, founding partner of the firm Johnston Marklee & Associates

==== K ====
- Michelle Kaufmann, green architect and designer
- Anna Keichline (1889–1943), first registered female architect in Pennsylvania
- Fay Kellogg (1871–1918), "the foremost woman architect in the United States" in the early 20th century
- Sheila Kennedy, Professor of Architecture at MIT, winner of International Building Exhibition award
- Gertrude Lempp Kerbis (1926–2016), modernist architect with Bauhaus connections, and with links to Frank Lloyd Wright
- Florence Knoll (1917–2019), architect and furniture designer
- Rosalyn Koo (1929–2021), Chinese-born American, manager at MBT Associates, San Francisco, also a philanthropist
- Gertrude Kuh (1893–1977), landscape architect active in the Chicago area

==== L ====
- Ellamae Ellis League (1899–1991), first woman FAIA from Georgia
- Grace La (born 1970), Professor of Architecture at Harvard University, co-founder of LA DALLMAN in Boston, MA and Milwaukee, WI
- Cara Lee, co-founded a firm in Los Angeles, California, in 2003
- Andrea Leers, founded the Boston-based firm Leers Weinzapfel Associates
- Brenda Levin, based in Los Angeles, California, advocate of historic preservation
- Diane Lewis (1951–2017), architect, first female faculty at Cooper Union
- Maya Lin (born 1959), designer of the Vietnam Veterans Memorial in Washington, D.C.
- Jing Liu (architect) (born 1980), co-founder of New York-based firm SO-IL
- Mimi Lobell (1942–2001), architect and academic
- MJ Long (1939–2018), principal architect partner on the British Library in London
- Ivenue Love-Stanley, first African American woman licensed architect in the Southeast
- Florence Luscomb (1887–1985)

==== M ====
- Marion Manley (1893–1984), based in Florida, collaborated on the University of Miami campus
- Elisabeth Martini (1886–1984), active in Chicago
- Susan Maxman (1938–1997), first woman president of the AIA (1992)
- Ida McCain (born 1884, date of death unknown), early female architect active on the West Coast
- Margaret McCurry (born 1942), partner with Stanley Tigerman in Tigerman McCurry Architects in Chicago
- Marcia Mead (1879–1967), partner in the early female firm Schenck & Mead in New York City
- Elise Mercur (1869–1947), early female architect in Pennsylvania
- Amaza Lee Meredith (1895–1984), early African American architect, known for Azurest South
- Harriet Moody (1891–1966)
- Julia Morgan (1872–1957), first woman to obtain an architecture degree at the École des Beaux-Arts
- Toshiko Mori (born 1951), Japanese architect based in New York City
- Gertrude Comfort Morrow (ca. 1888–1983), opened her own office in San Francisco, contributed to the Golden Gate Bridge
- Edla Muir (1906–1971), designed residences in Southern California
- Louise Caldwell Murdock (1857–1915), interior designer and architect active in Wichita, Kansas

==== N ====
- Edith Northman (1893–1956), one of Southern California's first women architects

==== O ====
- Eleanor Manning O'Connor (1884–1973), partner in the female firm Howe, Manning & Almy, Inc. in Boston
- Kathleen O'Donnell (born 1988), architect and founding partner of Studio Gang/O'Donnell [Now Studio/Gang]
- Carole J. Olshavsky (born 1947), own firm in 1975, state architect for Ohio
- Kate Orff (born 1971), landscape architect, founder of SCAPE

==== P ====
- Mary L. Page (1849–1921), first American woman to graduate in architecture in the United States
- Cary Millholland Parker (1902–2001), landscape architect, worked with Rose Greely and Gertrude Sawyer
- Elizabeth Pattee (1893–1991)
- Juliet Peddle (1899–1979), first woman architect licensed in Indiana
- Brigitte Peterhans (1928–2021), worked on many renowned buildings internationally, including the Sears Tower, Chicago
- Nelle Peters (1884–1974), prolific architect in Kansas City
- Carolyn Peterson, Texas preservation architect and Fellow of the AIA
- Eleanore Pettersen (1916–2003), one of the first female architects in New Jersey
- Alberta Pfeiffer (1899–1994), one of the first female architects in Illinois
- Marjorie Pierce (1900–1999), architect who practiced in Massachusetts
- Emily Pilloton-Lam (born 1982), design educator
- Elizabeth Plater-Zyberk (born 1950), co-founder of Miami's Duany Plater-Zyberk & Company; academic
- Linda Pollari, active in Los Angeles, California
- Monica Ponce de Leon (born 1965), National Design Award Winner; practicing architect; founder of MPdL Studio
- Ethel B. Power (1881–1969), writer on architecture and magazine editor

==== R ====
- Amy Porter Rapp (1908–2002), active in Portland, Oregon
- Eleanor Raymond (1888–1989), prominent architect in Boston and Cambridge, Massachusetts
- Florence Kenyon Hayden Rector (1882–1973), first licensed female architect in Ohio
- Hilde Reiss (1909–2002) (fl. 1930s–1960s), German-born architect, active in Minneapolis
- Lilian Jeannette Rice (1889–1938), worked in California in the Spanish colonial style
- Elizabeth Chu Richter (born 1949), originally from Hong Kong but made her career in Texas; 2015 President of the AIA; has designed notable buildings in the Corpus Christi area
- Theodate Pope Riddle (1867–1946), first female licensed architect in both New York and Connecticut
- Jane Silverstein Ries (1909–2005), Colorado landscape architect
- Lutah Maria Riggs (1896–1984), early female architect, active in Southern California, especially Santa Barbara, California
- Isabel Roberts (1871–1955), member of the architectural design team in the Oak Park Studio of Frank Lloyd Wright
- Annie Rockfellow (1866–1954), prolific architect in Tucson, Arizona
- Rocio Romero (born 1971), Chilean-American architect
- Karla Rothstein (born 1966), German American architect, educator, active in New York City
- Sigrid Lorenzen Rupp (1943–2004), German-born architect in Silicon Valley
- Marie Russak (1865–1945), singer, esotericist, also designed houses in Krotona, California
- Ida Annah Ryan (1873–1950), pioneering woman architect

==== S ====
- Patricia Saldaña Natke (born 1964), founding partner of UrbanWorks, Chicago
- Christine Salmon (1916–1985), mainly residential, focus on housing for the disabled
- Verna Cook Salomonsky (1890–1950), mainly residential architecture
- Hilary Sample, principal and co-founder of award-winning architecture firm MOS Architects
- Adèle Naudé Santos, based in San Francisco, focus on low-income housing
- Gertrude Sawyer (1895–1996), early female architect in Maryland and Washington D.C.
- Anna Pendleton Schenck (1874–1915), partner in the New York firm of Schenck & Mead
- Cathy Simon, San Francisco Bay Area architect
- Norma Sklarek (1926–2012), first black female licensed architect in the US
- Chloethiel Woodard Smith (1910–1992), architect and urban planner in Washington, D.C.
- Anna Sokolina (born 1956), PhD, architect, author, curator, educator, founder and Chair of Women in Architecture AG, the WiA AG Legacy Committee, and the WiA AG Registers Committee of the Society of Architectural Historians
- Laurinda Hope Spear (born 1950), co-founder of Arquitectonica
- Margaret Fulton Spencer (1882–1966), second woman to become a member of the American Institute of Architects
- Sharon E. Sutton (born 1941), African American architect and architectural educator and Fellow of the American Institute of Architects
- Patricia Swan (1924–2012), active in Calgary, Alberta, and Denver, Colorado

==== T ====
- Hilda Taba (1902–1967), architect, theorist, and educator
- Marilyn Jordan Taylor (born 1949), partner of Skidmore, Owings & Merrill, founder of Transport and Airport Design Division
- Jane Thompson (1927–2016), principal of Thompson Design Group
- Martha Cassell Thompson (1925–1968), African American architect and chief restoration architect for the National Cathedral
- Polly Povey Thompson (1904–1994), early 20th-century American architect, principal in the firm Polly Povey Thompson, Ray Kermit Thompson, Architects
- Lucy Doolittle Thomson (1868–1943), early graduate of Massachusetts Institute of Technology and architectural drafter for firm in Pittsfield, Massachusetts
- Martha Thorne (born 1953), educator, curator, writer, executive director of the Pritzker Prize
- Olive Tjaden (1904–1997) the only woman member of the American Institute of Architects for many years.
- Billie Tsien, Tod Williams (born 1943) Billie Tsien (born 1949) partner, Tod Williams Billie Tsien Architects
- Anne Tyng (1920–2011), close collaborator of Louis Kahn

==== V ====
- Margaret Van Pelt Vilas (1905–1995), opened a practice in New Haven, Connecticut in 1958
- Shirley Jane Vernon (1930–2011), architect and architectural educator in Pennsylvania, was a Fellow of the AIA
- Lella Vignelli (1934–2016), architect and designer
- Lauretta Vinciarelli (1943–2011), artist, architect, and architectural educator

==== W ====
- Roberta Washington, founded one of the few architecture firms led by an African American
- Hazel Wood Waterman (1865–1948), worked in Arts and Crafts style in Southern California
- Nelva Weber (1908–1990), landscape architect in New York City
- Jane Weinzapfel, co-founder of the Boston-based firm Leers Weinzapfel Associates
- Marion Weiss (born 1957), co-founder of Weiss/Manfredi, and Professor of Architecture at the University of Pennsylvania
- Candace Wheeler (1827–1923), interior designer
- Sarah Whiting (born 1964), academic and author
- Bertha Yerex Whitman (1892–1984), first female architecture graduate from the University of Michigan, active in Illinois
- Elizabeth Whittaker, founder of Merge Architects in Boston and professor at Harvard University's Graduate School of Design
- Leila Ross Wilburn (1885–1967), one of the first female architects in Georgia
- Emily Williams (1869–1942), pioneering female architect in San Jose, California and San Francisco
- Beverly Willis (1928–2021), influential in design development, active mainly in San Francisco
- Alda Heaton Wilson (1873–1960), architect and civil engineer from Iowa
- Zelma Wilson (1918–1996), active mainly in California
- Marjorie Wintermute (1919–2007), active in Oregon
- Catherine Bauer Wurster (1905–1964), architect and urban social activist

==== Y ====
- Georgina Pope Yeatman (1902–1982), active in Philadelphia
- Florence Yoch (1890–1972), landscape architect active in California
- Meejin Yoon (born 1972), Korean-American architect and designer, co-founder of Höweler+Yoon
- Helen Binkerd Young (1877–1959), early New York architect and architectural educator

==== Z ====
- Astra Zarina (1929–2008), architect and academic
- Zoka Zola, Croatian-born American architect, active in Chicago since 1990

== South America ==
=== Argentina ===
- Diana Agrest (born 1945), co-founded Agrest and Gandelsonas Architects in New York City
- Cristina Álvarez Rodríguez (born 1967), various administrative positions
- Alicia Cazzaniga (1928–1968), best known for designing the National Library of the Argentine Republic
- Noemí Goytia (born 1936), Argentine architect, professor
- Sara Gramática (born 1942), co-founded GGMPU Arquitectos in Córdoba, Argentina
- Mabel Lapacó (1930–2016), Brutalist architect
- Martha Levisman (1933–2022), architect and archivist
- Zaida Muxí (born 1964), architect, city planner
- Filandia Elisa Pizzul (1902–1987), first female architecture graduate in Argentina
- Graciela Silvestri (born 1954), architect, educator, researcher
- Susana Torre (born 1944), feminist with academic and practical experience, strong supporter of women's role in architecture
- Itala Fulvia Villa (1913–1991), Buenos Aires urban planner
- Marina Waisman (1920–1997), Premio América laureate in 1987

=== Brazil ===
- Lina Bo Bardi (1914–1992), Italian-born Brazilian modernist architect. Designer of the São Paulo Museum of Art and the SESC Pompéia.
- Georgia Louise Harris Brown (1918–1999), African American who spent most of her career in Brazil
- Carla Juaçaba (born 1976), received the first arcVision prize for Women and Architecture
- Lota de Macedo Soares (1910–1967), self-taught architect and landscape architect emeritus, created the Parque do Flamengo, RJ
- Carmen Portinho (1903–2001), third woman to graduate as an engineer in Brazil and later designed the Museum of Modern Art, Rio de Janeiro with Affonso Eduardo Reidy
- Anna Maria Niemeyer (1927–2012), architect, furniture designer and gallery owner. Creator of Alta and Rio lounge chairs.
- Ana Luiza Nobre (born 1964), architectural historian, author and critic. Director of the History, Theory and Criticism Section of the School of Architecture and Urbanism at the Pontifical Catholic University of Rio de Janeiro.
- Raquel Rolnik (born 1956), architect and urban planner. She was Secretary of Urban Programmes at the Ministry of Cities during Luiz Inácio Lula da Silva first government and United Nations special rapporteur on the Right to Adequate Housing (2008–2014).
- Chu Ming Silveira (1941–1997) architect and designer. Creator of the Orelhão telephone booth.
- Jô Vasconcellos (born 1947), architect, landscape designer, and urban planner. Designer of important buildings in Belo Horizonte, including the Centro de Cultura Presidente Itamar Franco and the Rainha da Sucata Building.

=== Chile ===
- Sophia Hayden (1868–1953), first female graduate of the four-year program in architecture at MIT.
- Antonia Lehmann (born 1955), first woman to receive the National Architecture Award of Chile.
- Loreto Lyon (born 1979), co-curator of the Chilean pavilion at the 2023 Venice Architecture Biennale.
- Glenda Kapstein Lomboy (1939–2008), winner of the 2003 PLEA Lifetime Achievement Award.
- Joan MacDonald (born 1941), Deputy Minister of Housing and Urbanism in Chile (1990–1994).
- Teresa Moller (born 1958), landscape designer. Designer of the award-winning Punta Pite project in 2005.
- Montserrat Palmer (born 1933), first female Dean of the Faculty of Architecture, Design, and Urban Studies at the Pontifical Catholic University of Chile.
- Margarita Pisano (1932–2015), architect, writer, and feminist theorist.
- Cecilia Puga (born 1961), architect, educator, and director of the Chilean Museum of Pre-Columbian Art.
- Dora Riedel (1906–1982), first Chilean woman to receive a degree in architecture.
- Rocio Romero (born 1971), Kit house designer
- Sofía von Ellrichshausen (born 1976), cofounder of award-winning art and architecture studio Pezo von Ellrichshausen.
- Sonia Tschorne (born 1954), first female Minister of Housing, Urban Development, and National Assets (2004–2006).

=== Colombia ===
- Luz Amorocho (1922–2019), first woman to graduate with a degree in architecture in Colombia; Director of Planning at the National University of Colombia, 1966–1988
- Diana Pombo (1952–2016), environmentalist, architect and writer.
- Emesé Ijjasz de Murcia (born 1936), architect specialized in social housing.

=== Paraguay ===
- Gloria Cabral (born 1982), titular partner of the firm Gabinete Arquitectura

=== Uruguay ===
- Charna Furman (born 1941), urban planning architect noted for designing urban spaces for women and marginalized groups
- Giulia Guarino (1897–1985), Italian-born architect, first woman architect in South America

== See also ==
- Women in architecture
- Women of the Bauhaus
