= Pizzul =

Pizzul (pronounced [ˈpittsul]) is an Italian surname from Gorizia, derived from a Venetian or Friulian cognate of Italian picciolo 'small' (Friulian: piçul). Notable people with the surname include:

- Bruno Pizzul (1938–2025), Italian footballer and journalist
- Filandia Elisa Pizzul (1902–1987), first woman to graduate from a school of architecture in Argentina
- Luca Pizzul (born 1999), Italian footballer
