= Joy Nwanyelimaka Nsolo =

Nigerian architect (1932–1988)

- Born: 1932; Nigeria
- Died: 1988 (aged 55–56)
- Education: Nigerian College of Arts, Science and Technology; University of Birmingham
- Occupation: Architect
- Awards: Member of the Order of the Federal Republic (1981)
- Buildings: State Secretariat Building, Benin City; State High Court, Benin City

Joy Nwanyelimaka Nsolo (1932–1988) was a Nigerian architect. She is recognised as the first woman to qualify as an architect in Nigeria and, more broadly, in West Africa, earning her credentials in 1962.

Nsolo spent her career in the public service of Mid-Western Nigeria, rising from chief architect to permanent secretary. Her two best-known buildings are both in Benin City — the State Secretariat Building and the State High Court, and the courthouse is reported to have served as a model for similar complexes built in other Nigerian states. In 1981 President Shehu Shagari made her a Member of the Order of the Federal Republic.

== Biography ==
Nsolo obtained her credentials in 1962 after studying at the Nigerian College of Arts, Science, and Technology and the University of Birmingham. She was an Associate of the Royal Institute of British Architects (RIBA). She went on to become Chief Architect in the civil service of Mid-Western Nigeria and was awarded the Member of the Federal Republic (MFR) in 1981. Her notable projects include the Secretariat Building in Benin City and the State High Court in Benin, the latter serving as a prototype for State High Court complexes across Nigeria.

== See also ==
- List of women architects
