= Kathryn H. Anthony =

American architect

- Education: University of California, Berkeley
- Occupations: Architecture professor, educator, author, advocate, critic
- Known for: environment-behavior and gender issues in design
- Website: https://kathryn-anthony.com/

Kathryn H. Anthony is an American professor of architecture, author and spokesperson specializing in gender issues in architecture. She is a Distinguished Professor from the Association of Collegiate Schools of Architecture (ACSA) lifetime laureate. Her research has earned national awards from the American Institute of Architects and the Environmental Design Research Association.

== Biography ==
Anthony earned a bachelor's degree in psychology and a Ph.D. in architecture from the University of California, Berkeley. She is the longest serving woman faculty member at the University of Illinois at Urbana–Champaign's School of Architecture.

Anthony has addressed gender issues in architecture on ABC World News, The Economist, National Public Radio, and The Wall Street Journal. Her research focuses on women in the field of architecture, and she has testified before the United States Congress on the topic of gender equality in restrooms used by the public.

== Awards ==
Anthony has received a number of awards for her work. In 2003, she received the Collaborative Achievement Award from the American Institute of Architects for her books: Designing for Diversity and Design Juries on Trial. In 2005, she received the Achievement Award from the Environmental Design Research Association. In 2010, she received an award for her contributions in teaching, publications and service in the architectural education from the Association of Collegiate Students of Architecture.

== Selected works ==
- Anthony, K.H. Defined by Design: The Surprising Power of Hidden Gender, Age, and Body Bias in Everyday Products and Places. Prometheus Books, 2017
- Anthony, K.H. Designing for Diversity: Gender, Race and Ethnicity in the Architectural Profession. University of Illinois Press, 2001, 2008.
- Anthony, K.H. and Barry Riccio. Running for Our Lives: An Odyssey with Cancer, 2004.
- Anthony, K.H. Design Juries on Trial: The Renaissance of the Design Studio. 20th Anniversary Edition,1991, 2012.
- Anthony, K. H. "Gender Issues in Architecture." Chapter 34. in Mitra Kanaani and Dak Kopec (eds.) The Routledge Companion to Architecture Design and Practice: Established and Emerging Trends. Milton Park, Abingdon Oxford, U.K. and New York, NY: Routledge, 2016, pp. 533–548.
- Anthony, K. H. "Repositioning Power: An Alternate Approach to Podium Design." in Beth Tauke, Korydon Smith, and Charles Davis (eds.) Diversity and Design: Understanding Hidden Consequences. Milton Park, Abingdon Oxford, U.K. and New York, NY: Routledge, 2016, pp. 191–206.
- Anthony, K. H. "Gender and Race in Contemporary Architecture: Reflections on a Seminar Taught for Over Two Decades." Chapter 15. in Carla Jackson Bell (ed.), Space Unveiled: Invisible Cultures in the Design Studio. Milton Park, Abingdon Oxford, U.K. and New York, NY: Routledge, 2015, pp. 157–171.
- Anthony, K. H. "Studio Culture and Student Life: A World of Its Own." in Joan Ockman (ed.) with Rebecca Williamson (research ed.), Architecture School: Three Centuries of Educating Architects in North America. Published on the Centennial Anniversary of the Association of Collegiate Schools of Architecture, 1912-2012, Cambridge, MA: MIT Press, 2012, pp. 396–401.
- Anthony, K. H. "Gender, Design and Stress. Expert Spotlight 5.1." in Dak Kopec, Environmental Psychology for Design, Second Edition, NY: Fairchild Books, 2012, pp. 88–89.
- Anthony, K. H. "Design Studios." Chapter 17. In Tridib Banerjee and Anastasia Loukaitou-Sideris (eds.). Companion to Urban Design. Milton Park, Abingdon Oxford, U.K. and New York, NY: Routledge, 2011, pp. 223–237.
- Anthony, K. H. and Nicholas Watkins, "A Legacy of Firsts: African Americans in Architecture at the University of Illinois at Urbana-Champaign," book chapter in Remembering Brown: The University of Illinois Commemorates Brown v. Board of Education, edited by Vernon Burton and David O'Brien, University of Illinois Press, 2009, pp. 281– 300.
- Anthony, K. H. and Meghan Dufresne. "Potty Privileging in Perspective: Gender and Family Issues in Toilet Design." in Ladies and Gents: Public Toilets and Gender. Edited by Olga Gershenson and Barbara Penner. Philadelphia, PA: Temple University Press, 2009, pp. 48–61.
- Anthony, K. H. and Meghan Dufresne. "Potty Parity in Perspective: Gender and Family Issues in Planning and Designing Public Restrooms." Journal of Planning Literature. 21:3 (February 2007), pp. 267–294.
- Anthony, K. H. "Designing for Diversity: Implications for Architectural Education in the Twenty-first Century," Journal of Architectural Education 55:4 (May 2002), pp. 257–267.
- Anthony, K. H. "Bitter Homes and Gardens: The Meanings of Home to Families of Divorce," Journal of Architectural and Planning Research, 14:1 (Spring 1997), pp. 1–19.

== See also ==
- Women in architecture

== Bibliography ==
- Allaback, Sarah (2008). The First American Women Architects. University of Illinois Press. ISBN 978-0-252-03321-6.
