= Selma Harrington =

Bosnian-Irish architect and designer

Selma Harrington née Arnautović is a Bosnian-Irish architect and designer. She holds a PhD in architecture from the University of Strathclyde and an MPhil European Studies from the Trinity College Dublin. She is an executive board member and vice-president (2020–21) and served as president of the Architects' Council of Europe (ACE) (2010–11 and 2012–13).

== Biography ==
Harrington was born and grew up in Sarajevo. She graduated in architecture (1978) and received a master's degree (1985) at the University of Sarajevo.

Having practiced as architect, furniture and product designer in Sarajevo, she moved to Harare, Zimbabwe (1991), where she set up her own design firm specializing in interior architecture, design and refurbishment (1993–99). Over the years, she has completed projects in Europe, Africa and Asia in the areas of hotel and office interiors, residential and furniture design. Upon relocation to Dublin, Ireland, she developed a portfolio of conservation, renovation and retrofit design projects. In parallel, she developed an academic career by leading a Master's programme in Interior Architecture and engaging in research. She is a Member of the Royal Institute of Architects in Ireland (RIAI) and a Head of Irish Delegation to the Architects Council of Europe (ACE).

Selma served as a secretary general of the European Council of Interior Architects (2004–2008), a President of the Institute of Designers in Ireland (IDI) - 2003 and an Honorary Treasurer of the Institute for Design and Disability in Ireland (IDDI) in 2001.
