= Assumpta Nnaggenda-Musana =

Ugandan architect (born 1970)

- Born: 1970 (age 55–56); Kampala, Uganda
- Citizenship: Uganda
- Education: Trinity College Nabbingo; Makerere High School; Kharkov State University of Civil Engineering and Architecture; KTH Royal Institute of Technology
- Occupations: Architect, urban planner, and academic
- Years active: 1997–present
- Title: Lecturer, Department of Architecture, Makerere University
- Spouse: Daniel Musana

Assumpta Nnaggenda-Musana (née Assumpta Nnaggenda), also Assumpta Nnaggenda Musana, is a Ugandan architect, urban planner and academic. She serves as a lecturer in the Department of Architecture and Physical Planning, in the College of Engineering, Design, Art and Technology, at Makerere University, the oldest and largest public university in Uganda. She was the first woman in Uganda to obtain a doctorate degree in architecture, and as of February 2019, the only one.

== Background and education ==
Nnaggenda-Musana was born to Mrs Grace Nnaggenda, a fashion designer and Professor Francis Nnaggenda, the well-known sculptor and painter. Both parents resided at Mengo, in Kampala, Uganda's capital city.

Nnaggenda-Musana attended Nakasero Primary School for her elementary schooling. For her O-Level studies, she went to Trinity College Nabbingo, in Wakiso District. She completed her A-Level education at Makerere High School, where she obtained her High School Diploma, in 1988.

Nnaggenda-Musana credits her parents, especially her father, with encouraging her to channel her artistic talents into architecture. In the 1980s, there were no architecture courses at Ugandan universities. Her father suggested that she applied for a scholarship. In 1989, she secured a scholarship to study in the former Soviet Union, and was admitted to the Kharkov State University of Civil Engineering and Architecture, in present-day Ukraine. In 1994, she graduated with a Bachelor of Science degree in Architecture. The following year, the same university awarded her a Master of Science degree in the same subject.

Later, she was admitted to the KTH Royal Institute of Technology, in Stockholm, Sweden, on scholarship from the Swedish International Development Cooperation Agency. There, she graduated with a Licentiate Degree in Urban Planning, in 2004. Four years later, she was awarded a Doctor of Philosophy degree in Urban Planning and the Environment, the first Ugandan woman to attain that academic achievement. Her studies at the Swedish Royal Institute of Technology involved periods of research in the "informal settlements" of Uganda and Kenya. She specializes in sustainable urban settlements and low-income housing schemes in developing countries.

== Career ==
In 1995, after earning her master's degree, Nnaggenda-Musana returned to Uganda and was hired by Land Plan Group, an architectural firm, as an architectural intern. She also worked as a part-time lecturer in the Department of Architecture at Makerere University. In 2002, the university hired her on a full-time basis as an assistant lecturer.

Upon graduation with her doctorate degree, she was promoted to full lecturer in 2008.

Nnaggenda-Musana has spoken out on the subject of affordable housing for the poor, and urged the Ugandan government and Kampala City Council (the predecessor to Kampala Capital City Authority), which she accused of corruption and incompetence, to do better in order to avoid sprawling slums.

Her research suggests that low-rise housing would be a better solution than single-storey detached dwellings for the very poor. It makes better use of land, is more likely to allow people to live within reach of jobs, and ultimately requires less expenditure on infrastructure. Her proposals could be part of an "enabling strategy" for low-cost housing using local people's ideas and craft skills, according to Professor Emeritus Dick Urban Vestbro of KTH. She has also been chief designer in a university team developing mobile public toilets for city centres, slum communities and other places with poor sanitation.

Her published work includes:

- "Domestic space as a survival strategy for low-income women"
- "Women as retrofits in modernist low-income housing"
- "Informal response to housing shortage in post-independent Uganda – any lessons for architects?"
- "User participation in the eyes of an architect and gendered spaces"

== Personal life ==
Nnaggenda-Musana is married to Daniel Musana, a fellow architect in private practice. They are the parents of one son, Joshua Musana.

== Other considerations ==
In addition to her academic responsibilities, Nnaggenda-Musana is an advisor to the National Planning Authority and has been involved in the National Development Plan.
