= Biambasuren Luvsandamdingiin =

Mongolian architect (born 1955)

Biambasuren Luvsandamdingiin (born 1955) is a Mongolian architect.

She studied architecture at the Mongolian University of Science and Technology, graduating in 1978. She was named architect for the State Construction Design Institute. As an urban planner, she did master plans for many of the master plans for cities and towns in Mongolia. In 1983, she developed a plan for the city of Khovd which preserved the older parts of the city and redeveloped the newer parts of the city. Her plan received a Laureate Award from the Union of Mongolian Architects. As of 2007, she was working for the city of Khovd as an urban planner.
