= Marjorie Wintermute =

American architect (1919–2007)

Marjorie Wintermute (1919–2007) was an American architect in Oregon. She was educated at the University of Oregon as an interior designer, graduating with a Bachelor of Arts in 1941. Following her graduation, she worked at the Bonneville Power Administration and then for Standard Oil in San Francisco as a drafter, after which she returned to Oregon to work for Pietro Belluschi's office in Portland. She received her architect's license in 1945.

== Career ==
Wintermute left Belluschi's office upon her marriage in 1947, and continued to work on residential projects from her home while raising her two children. In 1970 she became a principal at Architects Northwest. Over the next 15 years she held a variety of positions including architect-in-residence for the Washington County Education Service District, architect-in-residence for the Department of Defense Schools in Asia, and coordinator for the Oregon Arts Commission.

== Awards ==
Marjorie Wintermute received several awards in her lifetime for her contribution to education and the profession, including the Gold Medal from the Heart Association, a Gulick Award, a Portland Historic Landmarks Commission Award, and the Oregon Governor's Award for the Arts. She was named a Fellow of the American Institute of Architects.

== Books ==
- Students, Structures and Space (1978)
- Blueprints – A Built Environmental Education Program (1983)
- Architecture as a Basic Curriculum Builder (1991)
