= Dita Roque-Gourary =

Judith (Dita) Roque-Gourary (26 July 1915 in St. Petersburg – 2010 in Brussels) was a Russian-born architect who, after settling in Belgium in 1938, became an active proponent of women in architecture.

== Biography ==
Roque-Gourary's family left Russia after the 1917 Russian Revolution for Naples, Italy. She studied in Germany and Austria, almost completing her architecture degree in Vienna before the Anschluss in 1938 when she was forced to leave the country. She was, however, able to complete her degree at La Cambre in Brussels where she married the architect Jean Roque. After the war she worked with Jean Nicolet-Darche until she set up her own practice specializing in the renovation of 19th and 20th century residences during the reconstruction period.

In 1977, Roque-Gourary created Belgium's Union of Women Architects in Belgium where she was president until 1983. A statement at the time of the union's founding explained: "We intend to break away from a habit dating back hundreds if not thousands of years whereby women are only granted a secondary role. We wish to prove we are architects in our own right, able to complete valuable projects alone or together with our male colleagues." She also played an active part in the International Union of Women Architects (UIFA) where she was a persuasive speaker. She continued to support the role of women in architecture until she retired in 1984.
