= Patama Roonrakwit =

Thai architect

Patama Roonrakwit is a Thai architect. She has worked on underprivileged housing development projects for the poor in Thailand. She received her bachelor's degree in architecture from Silpakorn University. She later received her master's degree in development practice from Oxford Brookes University in England.

Roonrakwit has participated in more than forty housing development projects for underprivileged community and damaged villages in Thailand. She also constructed a shelter to help people after the tsunami in Phang-nag, a province in Southern Thailand. She also runs her own company, Case Limited, which she founded in 1997.

Roonrakwit was the only Thai woman architect to be selected for the final round of the arcVision Prize, women and architecture, which is an international award for women architects, organized by the Italcementi Group with a partnership of Asia Cement.

In 1999, Roonrakwit began leading workshops in Vietnam, Cambodia and Laos as a Field Course Tutor for Oxford Brookes University, from which she graduated. The same year, Seiji Terakawa is inspired by her approach and creates CASE-Japan, initiating the TEN House project 5 years later in Osaka. This project, aimed at middle class, leads Roonrakwit to launch the TEN House Bangkok pilot program, completed in 2008.

The long lasting cooperative processes she developed for two decades in South-East Asia from informal settlements was awarded a Global Award for Sustainable Architecture in 2016.

== Awards ==
Global Award for Sustainable Architecture 2016

== Sources ==
- Charlesworth, Esther (27 June 2014). Humanitarian Architecture: 15 Stories of Architects Working After Disaster. London: Routledge. ISBN 978-1-317-69079-5.
- Contal, Marie-Hélène; Revedin, Jana (May 2017). Sustainable Design 5, Vers une nouvelle éthique pour l'architecture et la ville / Towards a new ethics for architecture and the city. Paris: Editions Alternatives / Cité de l'architecture & du patrimoine. ISBN 978-2-072-718-649.
