= Mary Clemens de Lisle =

New Zealand architect (born 1922)

- Born: Mary Clemens Hay; 1922; Auckland, New Zealand
- Died: 11 January 2012 (aged 89–90)
- Education: University of Auckland
- Occupation: Architect
- Spouse: Aubrey de Lisle
- Children: 2

Mary Clemens de Lisle (née Hay) was an architect and artist based in Hamilton, New Zealand. She was the fifth woman to graduate with a bachelor of architecture and the sixth to become member of the New Zealand Institute of Architects (NZIA). She worked at the Hamilton-based firm White, de Lisle and Fraser, with her husband Aubrey de Lisle.

== Biography ==
De Lisle was born in Auckland in 1922 as Mary Clemens Hay. She was the only child of Gordon Clemens Hay and Gertrude Williams.

Hay began studying architecture at School of Architecture at the University of Auckland in 1939 and in 1945 became the fifth woman in Aotearoa New Zealand to graduate with a bachelor of architecture. During this time she served for one year on the Auckland University College Students' Executive

In 1943, Hay became ill with meningitis which delayed her taking her final exams and completing her final year thesis. Later she became the sixth woman in the country to become a member of the New Zealand Institute of Architects (NZIA).

Hay worked for the Ministry of Works housing division after university. She then left to work with Vernon Brown, largely on residential projects in Auckland, and working on detailing. She returned to the Ministry of Works in 1945, also becoming an Associate member of the Royal Institute of British Architects (RIBA) at this time.

Hay married Aubrey de Lisle, whom she met at the University of Auckland, in 1950, following their move to Hamilton in 1948. De Lisle and her husband had two sons.

Mary de Lisle's speech in 1969 to the Architect's Wives at the N.Z.I.A Conference at Rotorua, identified issues of addressing housing to meet the future population growth, noting that each month 70-80 new houses should be constructed. de Lisle provided an example of the expected growth through to 2020. At the N.Z.I.A Conference de Lisle reminded everyone of the Declaration of Human Rights from the 1948 Paris conference and the 1966 21st Session of the United Nations General Assembly and the adoption key international covenants the International Covenants on Human Rights and the International Covenant on Economic, Social and Cultural Rights (IESCR) and the International Covenant on Civil and Political Rights (ICCPR). de Lisle had highlighted that the key items were on the rights on freedom of speech, beliefs and to live without fear and want.

Mary de Lisle presented to her audience how different housing typologies could create interactive communities for all ages and one her key messages was:

"The Maori - pakeha relationships are most important in our North Island towns and cities and in the overall standard of our architecture which is for people - Maori and European..."

After moving to Hamilton, she worked part-time for Edgecumbe White Architects, which became White, de Lisle and Fraser, with her husband Aubrey de as a partner. De Lisle worked with largely with George Leigh, another partner in the firm as opposed to with her husband. Together with her husband, she worked on several residential projects including several Waikato farmhouses. She retired from White, de Lisle and Fraser in 1984.

Both de Lisle and her husband were also artists, with Aubrey working in watercolour for the most part, whereas de Lisle worked in etchings and aquatint prints.

De Lisle died on 11 January 2012. She had been predeceased by her husband, Aubrey de Lisle, in 2004.

== Career ==
As an architect Hay was reportedly at the forefront of the design concept phase, taking the projects through to detailed design for the financial and administrative team to take forward.

One house that de Lisle designed on her own was the Foreman House on River Road, Hamilton. She was also involved in three other houses built on River Road, including their own home in 1956.

Hay was an active member for the YWCA committee and the Federation of University Women. During Hay's leadership as Chair of the YWCA Building Committee she contributed to the development of a new 90-bed hostel for young women, utilising her expertise as an architect.

She has several artworks in the collection of the Waikato Museum Te Whare Taonga o Waikato. They are primarily etchings and aquatint prints, following de Lisle taking printmaking classes in the 1970s. Both her and Aubrey de Lisle's artworks were featured in an exhibition "Art and Architecture: Works by Aubrey and Mary de Lisle" from 4 March 2016 - 17 April 2016.
