= Patricia Swan =

American architect

Patricia W. Swan
- Born: April 21, 1924; Malden, Massachusetts, United States
- Died: January 23, 2012 (aged 87)
- Education: Antioch College; Columbia University
- Occupation: Architect
- Practice: Skidmore, Owing and Merrill
- Projects: Toronto Dominion Square, Denver Square

Patricia W. Swan (April 21, 1924 – January 23, 2012) was an American architect.

Swan was an architect for the international architectural and engineering firm Skidmore, Owing and Merrill for thirty five years. She was one of two women Participating Associates with the firm in 1956 and became an Associate Partner in 1970. She is known for projects that include the Toronto Dominion Square, in Calgary, Alberta and Denver Square in Denver, Colorado.

== Life ==
She was born in Malden, Massachusetts to Mary (Flett) Swan and Dewey Swan. She earned degrees from Antioch College and Columbia University.

== Career ==
Swan briefly attended Antioch College for a year before entering the Women's Army Corps in 1944. From 1944 to 1946, Swan served as a wartime military meteorologist. After serving, Swan attended Columbia University to earn her architectural degree. She graduated in 1951. Following graduation, Swan began working for Skidmore, Owings, Merrill at a time when it was most unusual for women to work in architecture. She first worked at the New York offices and went on to help develop the Denver office. She was the lead designer of the Republic Plaza in Denver and many other buildings in the city. She and her team designed high rises and urban complexes for working, shopping, and entertainment. Swan retired in 1986.

Swan died in Denver in 2012 at the age of 87. In the words of her sister, Sandy Swan: "She had a rare combo of executive talent and artistic talent."
