= Afaina de Jong =

Dutch architect (born 1977)

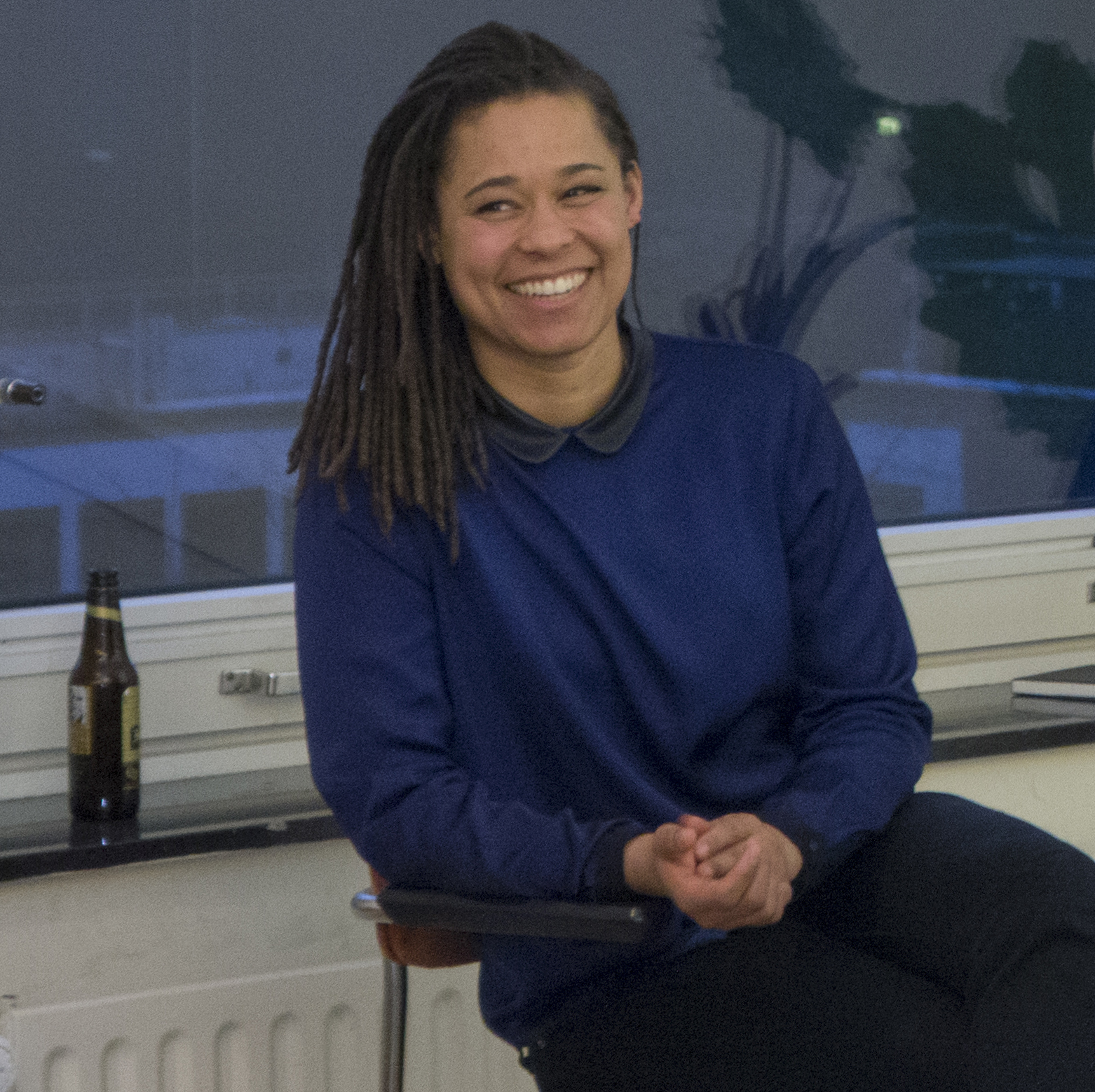
- Afaina de Jong attending Leiderschap in Cultuur in 2014
- Born: 1977
- Citizenship: Netherlands
- Education: Delft University of Technology
- Occupation: Architect
- Organization: AFARAI
- Notable work: The Multiplicity of Other
- Website: www.afarai.com

Afaina de Jong (born 1977) is a Dutch architect, researcher and founder of AFARAI, a self-considered "feminist practice that encourages change on social and spatial issues and that accommodate difference."

== Career ==
De Jong graduated from the Delft University of Technology in 1996. Prior to establishing her own firm in 2005, de Jong worked for the Hakuhodo Institute of Life and Living in Tokyo, and AMO-OMA in Rotterdam.

AFARAI practice has been described as "a dizzying rewriting of cultural codes and messages" while de Jong's work has been labeled as "afrofuturism" due to the "integrating concepts and movements in fine art, architecture and urbanism with Japanese- and African-influenced graphic design and street codes such as graffiti and hip-hop culture."

Her projects include the MC theater refurbishment, the redevelopment of the Hofplein station (known as the Mini Mall), alongside PEÑA architecture, and Ultra de la Rue gallery with Inna Vision in Amsterdam.

Her design research The Multiplicity of Other was commissioned for Who is we?, the Dutch pavilion at the Venice Architecture Biennale in 2021.

Since 2021, de Jong has been the head of the Contextual Design MA department at Design Academy Eindhoven. She has been a guest lecturer at Columbia University GSAPP in New York, KTH in Stockholm and the Rhode Island School of Design in Providence.
