= Anne Debarre =

French architect (born 1957)

Anne Debarre (born 1957) is a French architect, educator and researcher. She is also known as Anne Debarre-Blanchard.

Born in Paris, she qualified as an Architecte diplômé par le gouvernement and then earned a Certificat d'Études Approfondies in architecture from the École d'Architecture Paris-Villemin and a Diplôme d'Études Approfondies from Paris 8 University. She has been an assistant professor in architectural history and culture at the École nationale supérieure d'architecture de Paris-Malaquais and at the École d'Architecture Paris-Villemin. She is a member of the Architecture laboratory at the French Centre national de la recherche scientifique. She also serves on the Scientific Council for the Ecole d'Architecture Paris-Malaquais.

Debarre has contributed numerous articles to various journals, including Archiscopie, CLARA, Métropolitiques and Journal des anthropologues, and her writing appears in several anthologies. She has also participated in many scientific conferences.

== Books ==
- Habiter à Saint-Quentin-en-Yvelines, entre utopie et innovation, with Pascal Mory (2002)
- L'invention de l'habitation moderne, Paris, 1880-1914, with Monique Eleb (1995)
- L'architecture domestique 1600-1914. Une bibliographie raisonnée, with Monique Eleb (1993)
- Architectures de la vie privée. XVIIe-XIXe siècles, with Monique Eleb (1989)
- Architecture domestique et mentalités. Les traités et les pratiques. XIXe siècle, with Monique Eleb (1985)
