= Carole J. Olshavsky =

- Education: Kent State University
- Occupation: Architect
- Awards: Thomas Jefferson Award
- Buildings: Wexner Center for the Arts, Inventors' Hall of Fame

Carole J. Olshavsky, FAIA, an American architect. She is the former state architect of Ohio and a recipient of the American Institute of Architects' (AIA) 2014 Thomas Jefferson Award for her contributions to public architecture. She is the only woman to serve as state architect for Ohio, and the first woman to be awarded the American Institute of Architects' Ohio Gold Medal, the highest honor awarded by AIA Ohio.

== Life ==
Olshavsky is a graduate of Kent State University, and earned her architecture license in 1973. She opened an architecture firm with her husband, Donald Olshavsky, in 1975, in Ohio.

In 1985, she was appointed state architect for the state of Ohio, and stayed in that position until 1988. During her tenure, she oversaw projects including the construction of the Wexner Center for the Arts and the National Inventors Hall of Fame at the University of Akron. During her tenure, she contributed to new state legislation that established qualifications-based assessment of design bids, so contracts were legally obliged to not simply go to the least expensive proposal. Between 1988 and 1991 Olshavsky took the position within Ohio's Department of Public Works as the deputy director. After 1991 she returned to the private sector she had left in 1985.

In 2003, she rejoined the public sector as senior executive of capital improvements for Columbus City Schools. Columbus City Schools had 116 schools in 2002 and this include 16 high schools. She led a 15-year, $1.3 billion school reconstruction program.

As of 2015, Olshavsky serves as president of the Architects Society of Ohio, chair on the AIA Committee on Public Architecture, AIA regional director and national vice president, and chancellor for the AIA College of Fellows.
