= Sara Gramática =

Argentine architect (born 1942)

- Born: 26 May 1942 (age 84); Villa Dolores, Córdoba, Argentina
- Education: National University of Córdoba
- Occupation: Architect
- Practice: GGMPU Arquitectos

Sara Rosina Gramática (born May 26, 1942) is an Argentine architect. She was part of the GGMPU Arquitectos firm, based in Córdoba, for over 40 years. She is currently active with MGM y Asociados, alongside her husband and son. Her work includes residential housing as well as large-scale public buildings. She has received the Konex Award for Visual Arts and a Buenos Aires Biennial Award for her contributions to social housing. Gramática has also served as Vice President of the Society of Architects of Córdoba.

== Career ==
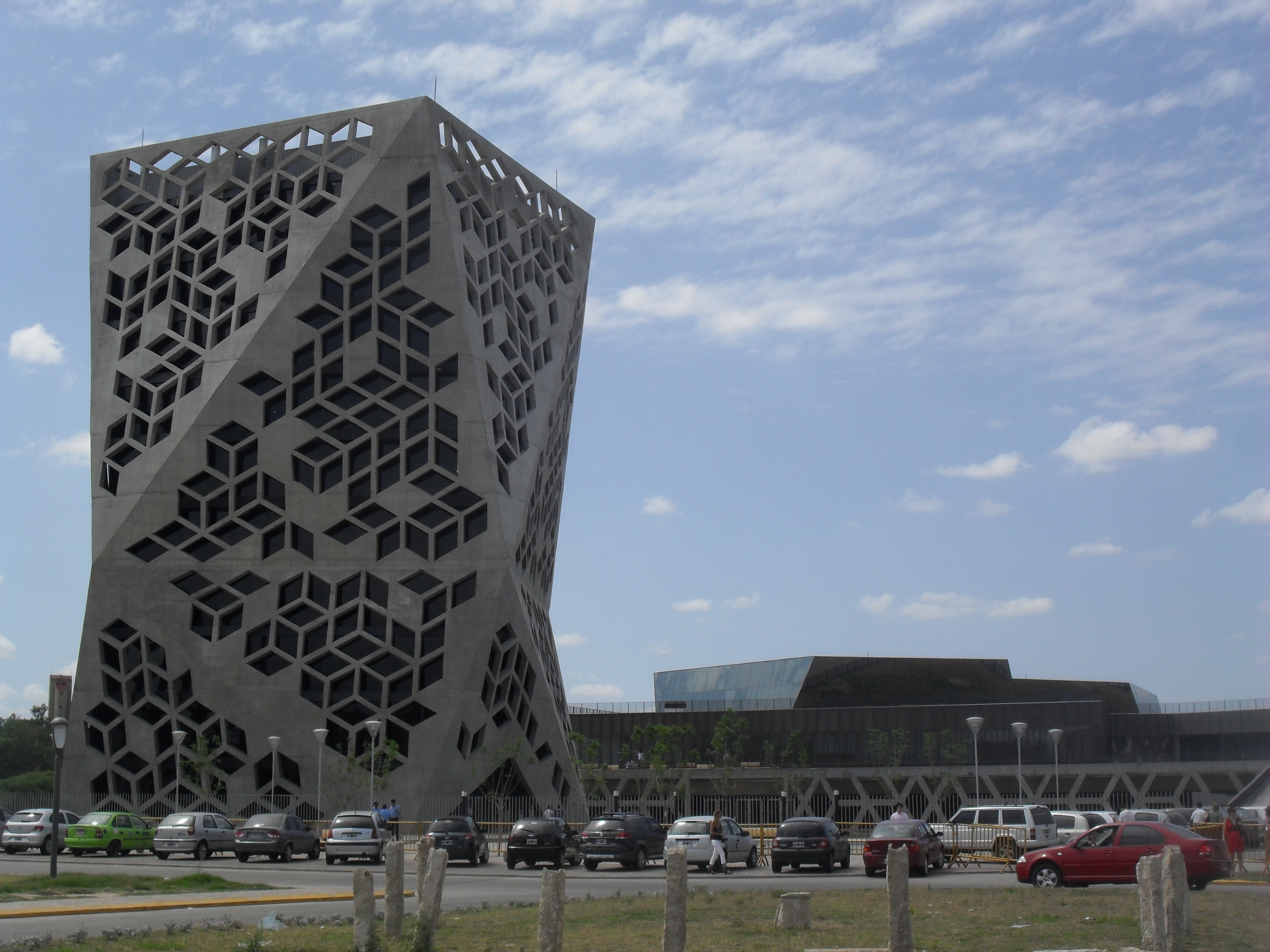
Centro Civico Córdoba (2012)

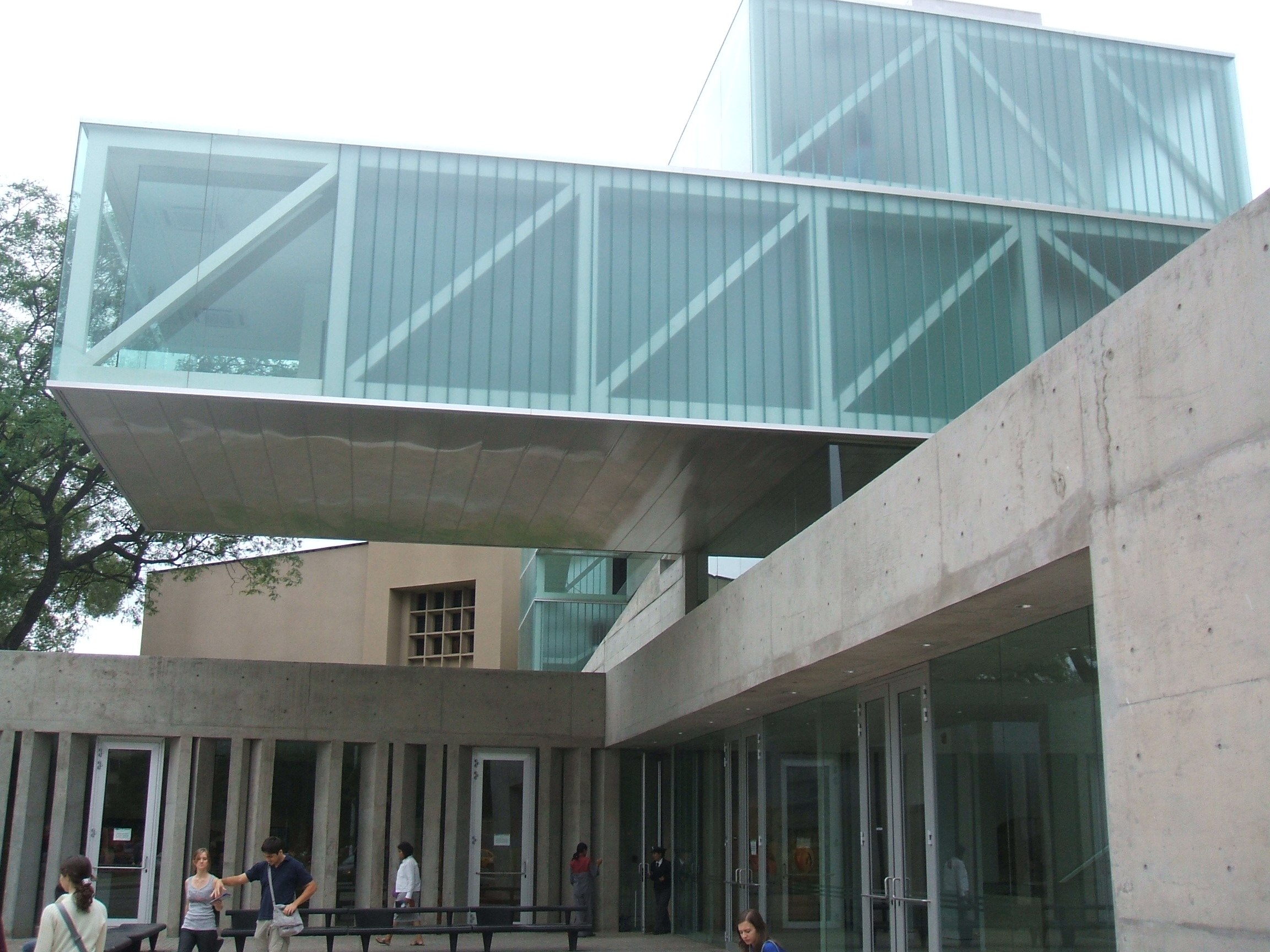
Museo Caraffa (2007)

In 1967, she began collaborating with architects Juan Carlos Guerrero, Jorge Morini, José Pisani, and Eduardo Urtubey, whom she had met at university. Together, they founded GGMPU, named after their initials. The firm operated until 1971, when they founded Copsa. Activities were transferred back to GGMPU in 1995.

In 2002, during the financial crisis in Argentina, Gramática, along with Morini, Pisani, and Urtubey, founded GMPU S.L. (Gramática, Morini, Pisani, and Urtubey Sociedad Limitada) in Málaga, Spain. The firm designed residential buildings on the Mediterranean coast.

Beginning in 2006, Gramática collaborated on several projects with her son, Lucio Morini.

In 2013, GGMPU and GMPU S.L. ceased operations, and their activities were taken over by MCM y Asociados (Morini, Gramática, Morini), in which Gramática is currently active.

Among GGMPU's completed projects in Argentina were: Nazareth III (1991), Casa en el Lago in Villa Carlos Paz (1995), Palacio de Justicia II (1998), and the extension to the Museo de Bellas Artes Emilio Caraffa (2008). In collaboration with Lucio Morini, the Centro Civico was completed in 2012.

== Personal life ==
Born on May 26, 1942, in Villa Dolores, Gramática studied architecture at the National University of Córdoba, graduating in 1965.

Gramática and Morini are married and they have children.

== Awards ==
Gramática's awards include:

- 1985: Premio Bienal Buenos Aires for Best Female Architect in Social Housing
- 1992: Konex Award (Visual Arts)
- 1998: Premio Bienal internacional de Arquitectura for her Palacio de Justicia de Córdoba
- 2000: Vitruvio a la Trayectoria, Buenos Aires
