= Kirsteen Mackay =

British and Australian architect

- Education: Royal College of Art
- Occupation: Architect
- Practice: Springett Mackay Architecture

Kirsteen Mackay is a British and Australian architect, who is the South Australian Government Architect.

She is a registered architect in the United Kingdom and South Australia.

Mackay studied architecture at the Glasgow School of Art and completed her post-graduate degree in design at the Royal College of Art in London. She has 15 years experience in private practice, such as Marks Barfield Architects, and was former Head of the Design Review at the UK's Commission for Architecture and the Built Environment (CABE) for four years. Mackay was also a director of her own architecture firm Springett Mackay Architecture.

She was associate government architect in the Office for Design and Architecture SA (ODASA). In November 2014 she was appointed Acting Government Architect and Acting Manager, Architecture and Built Environment.

In July 2015 Mackay was appointed the South Australian Government Architect. In this role she leads the Architecture and Built Environment Directorate of the SA Department of Planning Transport and Infrastructure, along with the SA Design Review program.

Government offices
Preceded by Ben Hewett	South Australian Government Architect; 2015–present	Succeeded by incumbent
