= Teresa Coady =

Canadian architect

- Born: July 1956 (age 70); Toronto, Ontario
- Education: University of British Columbia
- Occupation: Architect
- Awards: 1999 YWCA Woman of Distinction Award for Entrepreneur/Innovator; 2008 RBC Canadian Woman Entrepreneur Award in the ‘Trailblazer’ Category; 2006 Profit 100; W100 list of Canada’s Top Women Entrepreneurs
- Buildings: Rogers Tower, Vancouver, BC (LEED); Broadway Tech Centre:Buildings 4, 6, 5, and 7(Vancouver, British Columbia); The Centre for Learning at Okanagan College (Kelowna, British Columbia); Discovery Place - Discovery Green Building 12 (Vancouver, British Columbia); District Education and Conference Centre (Surrey, British Columbia); Douglas Border Crossing (Surrey, British Columbia); Engineering & Management Building at UBC Okanagan Campus (Kelowna, British Columbia); Kwantlen Trades and Technology Centre (Cloverdale, British Columbia); Kwantlen Polytechnic University Administration Building (Surrey, British Columbia); Kwantlen Polytechnic University Library Building (Surrey, British Columbia); National Research Council's (NRC's) Institute for Fuel Cell Innovation facility(Vancouver, British Columbia); Ritchie Bros. Auctioneers Head Office (Burnaby, British Columbia); University of British Columbia Chemical & Biological Engineering Building (Vancouver, British Columbia); University of British Columbia Life Sciences Centre (Vancouver British Columbia); Vancouver Port Authority Head Office (Vancouver British Columbia)

Teresa Coady (born July 1956) is a Canadian architect and the former president and founding partner of the Vancouver, British Columbia-based architecture firm B+H BuntingCoady (now part of B+H Architects). She is a member of the Canadian Chapter of the International Initiative for a Sustainabie Built Environment and a member of the United Nations Environment Programme Advisory Board. She is the author of Rebuilding Earth: Designing Ecoconscious Habitats for Humans.

== Life and career ==
Coady received her degree in architecture in 1983 from the University of British Columbia. She is best known for her architectural work in the area of sustainability and energy-efficient design. In 1993, Teresa Coady and Tom Bunting founded Bunting Coady Architects; the practice was renamed in 2010 to B+H BuntingCoady Architects Inc. Coady completed two years of engineering and received a bachelor of fine arts prior to pursuing a master's degree in architecture.

The statement “We create Living, Breathing Buildings”, which is trademarked by B+H BuntingCoady, developed from Coady's master thesis entitled "The Living Breathing Building". Coady sites her thesis project "The Living Breathing Building" as the mechanism though which her architectural values came to light. While her thesis was initially rejected for being ‘not architectural’, the principles associated with the phrase “Living, Breathing Buildings” became the founding values upon which Bunting Coady Architects was initially created and upon which B+H BuntingCoady operates.

Coady believes that architecture is the means through which humans express cultural values and through which humans can prepare themselves for the future. The creation of architecture, for Coady, can have an enormous impact on the planet:

And if we do it well, we’ll succeed as a species. But if we continue to create mechanistic horrors around the planet, we’ll condemn ourselves to a very constrained future.

— Teresa Coady, Achieving Business Excellence (April 2009)

In her opinion, the concept of “Living, Breathing Building” is synonymous with a move away from the notion that buildings should be built as machines for inhabitation and towards biomimetics (the art and science of using nature and natural systems as the source of inspiration for creating buildings and building systems). A “Living, Breathing Building”, according to Coady, is a building that imitates nature and enhances the environment.

== The B+H BuntingCoady Integrated Design Process ==
Teresa Coady is also known for her involvement in the creation and development of the building method utilized by B+H BuntingCoady and referred to as the ‘integrated design process’ (IDP). The B+H BuntingCoady Integrated Design Process is composed of a series of steps that, according to Coady: “(work) anywhere, anytime on any kind of building”. The phases of this IDP process include: Orientation and Massing Site Design and Water, Envelope, Ventilation, Lighting and Power, Heating and Cooling, Materials, Life-cycle costing, Quality Assurance.

== Individual awards and recognition ==
Coady was selected as winner of the “Bell Trailblazer” category for the 2008 RBC Canadian Woman Entrepreneur Awards (CWEA). Coady was selected for this award (as described by AIArchitect This Week March 13, 2009), “for (her) outstanding leadership within her company and business sector” and because “her work is pioneering new ways of creating mainstream architecture that turns away from mechanistic systems to harnessing the ‘natural intelligence’ of buildings for sustainable and energy-efficient designs".

In 1999, Coady was awarded the YWCA Woman of Distinction Award; an award that honours “women whose outstanding achievements contribute to the well-being and future of (the) community.” She was also included in the 10th Annual Profit W100 list of Canada's Top Women Entrepreneurs (Published November 2008).

== United Nations Environment Programme ==
In May 2011, Coady was elected to the 2011 UNEP-SBCI Advocacy Committee. She attended the 2011 UNEP-SBCI Annual General Meeting and Symposium on Sustainable Buildings in Leverkusen, Germany, on May 23–24, 2011.

== Non-architectural work ==
Coady is actively involved in the Vancouver Cherry Blossom Festival. The festival encourages the world to visit and celebrate the phenomenon of the massive cherry tree bloom annually every spring in Vancouver.

== See also ==
- B+H Architects
- Biomimetics
- Sustainable architecture
