= Graciela Silvestri =

Argentine architect

- Born: 1954 (age 71–72)
- Education: University of Buenos Aires
- Occupation: Architect
- Practice: National Scientific and Technical Research Council

Graciela Silvestri (born 1954) is an Argentine architect, Professor of Architectural Theory and a senior researcher at the National Scientific and Technical Research Council (CONICET) in Argentina.

== Career ==
Silvestri earned both her degree in Architecture and Ph.D. in History from the University of Buenos Aires. The main focus of her work is on landscapes and urban design.

Silvestri is a professor at the Universidad Nacional de La Plata in Buenos Aires, Argentina as well as a Maestría en Historia de la Arquitectura at the Torcuato di Tella Institute. From 2005-2006, she was the de Fortabat Visiting Scholar at the David Rockefeller Center for Latin American Studies at Harvard University, where she returned in 2014 as the Robert F. Kennedy Visiting Professor. She has also been a visiting scholar at Cambridge University, the Iberoamerikanisches Institute Berlin. She has also served as a visiting professor at the Graduate School of Design at Harvard.

== Publications ==
- El Paisaje Como Cifra de Armonia. Nueva Visión, 1991. ISBN 978-950-602-430-7
- With Fernando Aliata: El Color del Rio: Historia Cultural del Paisaje del Riachuelo. Universidad Nacional de Quilmes, 2004. ISBN 978-987-558-016-9
- El lugar común: . EDHASA, 2011. ISBN 978-987-628-117-1
- La ciudad que fue olvidada. (PDF; 2,0 MB)
- Postales de Buenos Aires (Notas para leer en el subte). (PDF; 159 kB)
- With Jorge Silvetti: Territorio Guaraní. ReVista: Harvard Review of Latin America. Harvard University, 2015.
