= Giulia Guarino =

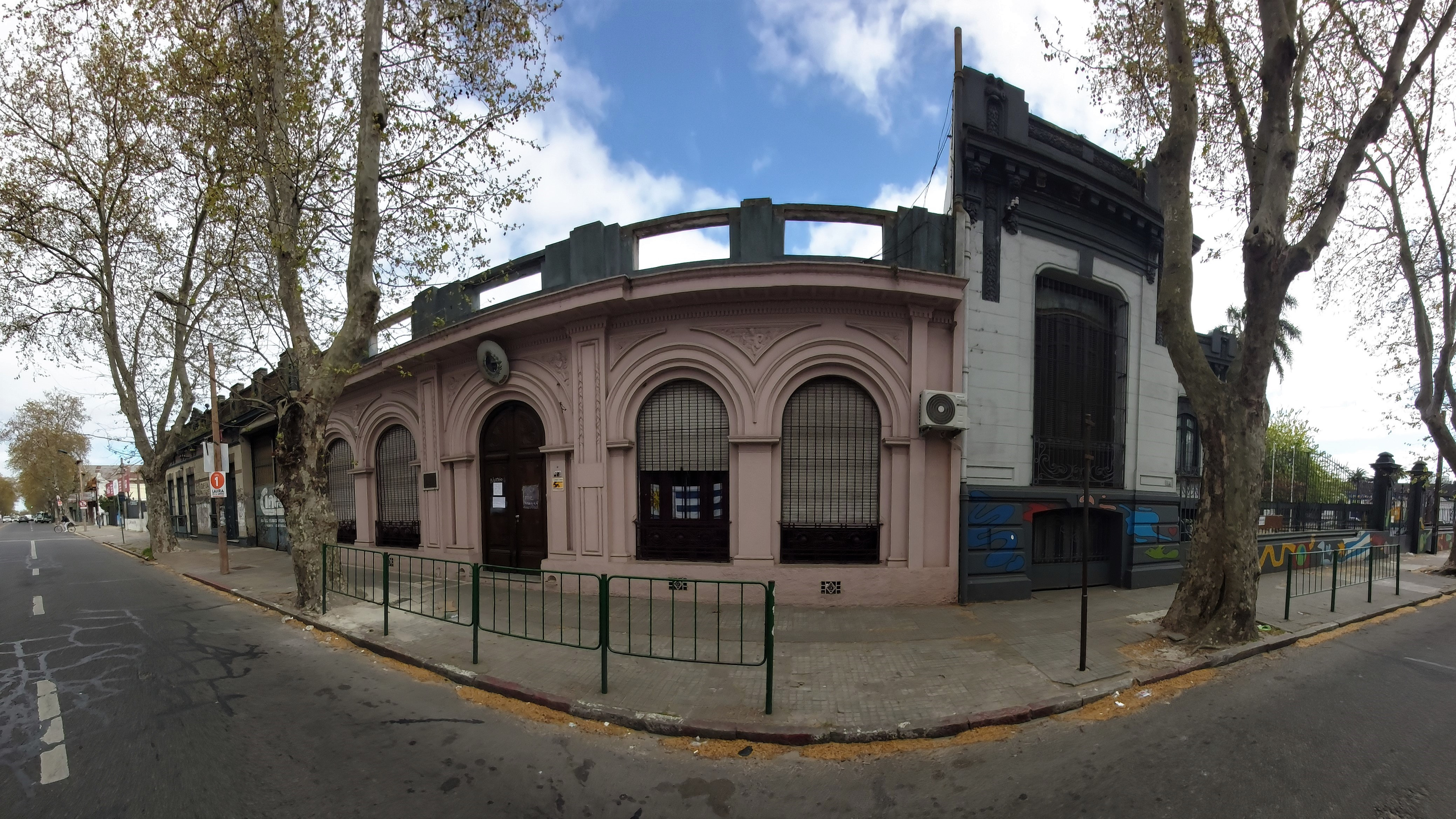
- Escuela Pedro Figari, Montevideo by Giulia Guarino
- Born: Julia Guarino Fiechter; 17 July 1897; Éboli, Italy
- Died: 31 July 1985 (aged 88); Montevideo, Uruguay
- Occupation: Architect

Giulia Guarino or Julia Guarino Fiechter (born 17 July 1897; died 31 July 1985) was an Italian/Uruguayan architect. She was the first Latin American woman to graduate with a degree in architecture in 1923.

She was depicted on a stamp in Uruguay.
