= Betsey Olenick Dougherty =

American architect

Betsey Olenick Dougherty is an American architect. She is a founding partner and principal of the architecture firm Dougherty in Costa Mesa, California, along with her husband Brian Dougherty. Dougherty received both a bachelors (1972) and master's degree (1975) in Architecture from University of California, Berkeley.,

She has been an active member of the American Institute of Architects (AIA) since 1976.

As one of the first professional women members of the AIA Orange County Chapter, she has continued to hold positions at all levels of the AIA, many as the first woman. She serves the California Architects Board as a Licensure Advocate and a member of the Professional Qualifications Committee, and currently serves on the board of the Academy of Neuroscience for Architecture.

She is the recipient of the Lifetime Achievement Award from American Institute of Architects, California Council (AIACC) along with her husband Brian Dougherty.

She was elected to AIA Fellowship, a program developed to elevate those architects who have made a significant contribution to architecture and society and who have achieved a standard of excellence in the profession. Betsey served as the 42nd Chancellor of the AIA College of Fellows in 2004.
