= Joan MacDonald =

Joan MacDonald (born Elizabeth Joan Mac Donald Maier in 1941) is a Chilean architect known for her work in housing and urban policy. She was Deputy Minister of Housing and Urbanism in Chile from 1990 until 1994 and the director of the Metropolitan service of Housing and Urbanisation in 1997. In 1995 she became a consultant for the sustainable settlement commission of CEPAL until 2005. Between 2003 and 2014 she was the president of SELAVIP, an organisation that worked providing popular housing for developing countries in Latin America, Africa and Asia. She was trained as an architect in Pontificia Universidad Catolica de Chile and was named Doctor Honoris Causa by the Universidad Católica de Cordoba (Argentina) in 2011. In 2011 she received a prize for her academic career from the Chilean chartered institute of architects.

== Selected publications ==
- El Mejoramiento de Barrios en el Marco de la Gestión Urbana, Serie Cuaderno de Análisis de PROMESHA- Programa de Cooperación Sueca en Guatemala, 2009.
- Desarrollo Sostenible de los Asentamientos Humanos: Logros y Desafíos de las Políticas de Vivienda y Desarrollo Urbano en América Latina y El Caribe con Daniela Simioni y otros, Naciones Unidas, CEPAL, Serie Medio Ambiente y Desarrollo, nº 7, 1998
- Incorporación de Indicadores de Género en los Programas Habitacionales del MINVU, con otros, en Boletín Nº 34 de Instituto de la Vivienda de la Facultad de Arquitectura y Urbanismo de la Universidad de Chile, 1998
- ¿Cuántas Casas Faltan? El Déficit a Nivel Nacional y Regional, Corporación de Promoción Universitaria, Santiago, 1994
- Ciudad y Vivienda en el Censo de 1992 – Análisis de las Comunas del Gran Santiago con Verónica Botteselle y Camilo Arriagada, Ministerio de Vivienda y Urbanismo, Santiago, 1993
- Gestión del Desarrollo Social Chileno – el primer año del Gobierno Democrático 1990–1991, con otros, Corporación de Promoción Universitaria, 1992
- Vivienda Progresiva, Corporación de Promoción Universitaria, Santiago, 1987

== Published interviews ==
- Zabalbeascoa, Anatxu (15 May 2011). "Zabalbeascoa, Anatxu. Dos hacen la ciudad: el negocio inmobiliario y los pobres, entrevista Joan MacDonald. 15 May 2011". El País.
- "Loredo, Alba. La apuesta por el urbanismo y la arquitectura social, entrevista Joan MacDonald. Diario El Mundo. 1 August 2012". elmundo.es.
