= Mary Ann Crawford =

American architect

Mary Ann Elizabeth Crawford (1901 – December 19, 1988) was an American architect. Born in Illinois, she trained at the University of Illinois and the Massachusetts Institute of Technology. Crawford became recognized in her later life for the architectural drawings that she executed as a student, some of which are now in museum collections.

== Early life ==
Mary Ann Crawford was born in Girard, Illinois.

== Education ==
She began her studies at the University of Illinois in 1919, but withdrew for health reasons. She transferred to the Massachusetts Institute of Technology, where she completed her B.A. studies in 1929 and received an M.A. in 1930.

== Career ==
In the midst of the Great Depression, Crawford found it challenging to find work as an architect. Crawford obtained her Illinois state architect's license in 1941 and her state engineer's license in 1943.

In 1978, some of Crawford's student drawings were featured in the "Chicago Women Architects" exhibition at Artemisia Gallery in Chicago, Illinois. In 1980, her drawings were the focus of a solo exhibition titled "American Beaux-Arts" at the Frumkin-Struve Gallery in Chicago, Illinois. Her architectural drawings are held in the collection of Cooper Hewitt, Smithsonian Design Museum and the Art Institute of Chicago.

Crawford died on December 19, 1988, in Springfield, Illinois.
