= Joyce Hwang =

American architect

Joyce Hwang is an American architect whose approach to architecture includes a special focus on non-human users of the built environment.

== Career ==
Hwang is a professor in the Department of Architecture at the University at Buffalo. She is also the Director of Ants of the Prairie, "an office of architectural practice and research that focuses on confronting contemporary ecological conditions through creative means." Ants of the Prairie was noted by the Architectural League of NY as an Emerging Voice of 2014. She was featured by the Museum of Modern Art, Ambasz Institute's "Built Ecologies" video series in 2022.
