= Martta Martikainen-Ypyä =

Finnish architect (1904–1992)

Martta Martikainen-Ypyä (September 19, 1904 – December 17, 1992) was a Finnish architect.

She was born Martha Irene Martikainen in Iisalmi and trained with architects Kaarlo Borg and Carolus Lindberg. From 1928 to 1936, she was architect for office buildings for the Finnish Ministry of Defence. She graduated from the Helsinki University of Technology in 1932.

In 1936, she married architect Ragnar Ypyä. The couple formed an architectural firm in Vyborg; in 1939, they moved to Helsinki. Following World War II, she worked in the housing production office of Hyresgästernas Sparkasse- och Byggnadslånebyrån (HSB) in Stockholm, becoming department head. Martikainen-Ypyä, by herself or in partnership with her husband, won a number or architectural competitions and also designed many hospitals, schools, factories, office building and housing projects.

Martikainen-Ypyä died in Helsinki at the age of 88.
