= Linda Pollari =

American architect

- Born: Linda Pollari
- Education: Masters, University of Illinois
- Occupation: Architect

Linda Pollari is an American architect. Based in Los Angeles, California, she serves as the principal of P XS.

== Career ==
She holds a Masters in Architecture from the University of Illinois at Chicago and BFA in Painting from the University of Wisconsin-Superior. Since 2000, she has served as Chair of the Architecture/Landscapes/Interiors Department at Otis College of Art and Design in Los Angeles. One of her best known works is a house she designed at the intersection of Olympic Boulevard and South Highland Avenue in Los Angeles.

Pollari is the recipient of numerous awards including House of the Month, December, 2007 from Architectural Record, a Citation from American Institute of Architects/Los Angeles, Next LA Awards; American Architecture Award, The Chicago Athenaeum: Museum of Architecture and Design Award of Excellence; Los Angeles Business Council 34th Los Angeles Architectural Awards Merit Award, American Institute of Architects/Los Angeles, Design Awards Finalist, San Jose State University Museum of Art and Design Competition Merit Award, AIA-Sunset 2003-2004 Western Home Awards House of the Year Award, Architecture and Metropolitan Home Magazines.

== Publications ==
- pen 4/1 No. 172, (Japan: 2006): 70-71
- archithese (Switzerland: 3.2007): 46-47
- California HOME+DESIGN (May 2007): 100-101
- FORM Pioneering Design (September/October 2007): 40
- Architectural Record.com, House of the Month (December 2007)
- 1000 x Architecture of the Americas (Verlagshaus Braun, 2008): 20.
- Architecture and Design: Los Angeles (Fusion Publishing, DAAB Book Series, 2008): 158-162
- SPACES Issue 21 (UK: April 2008): 3, 87-93

== Outside sources ==
- Office Profile from California Architects
