= Elisabeth von Baczko =

German architect (1868–1941)

Elisabeth von Baczko

Elisabeth Felicitas Emma Therese von Baczko (1868 in Mainz, Germany – February 27, 1941, in Berlin) was a German architect, artist, furniture designer, and interior designer. Trained in the carpentry trade, she became an architect, as well as a furniture and interior designer. She spend much of her life in Bremen and Berlin.

== Career ==
After learning the carpentry trade in the Saaleck workshops run by Paul Schultze-Naumburg von Baczko moved to Bremen in 1905. From 1909 to 1913, in collaboration with her sister Felicitas and the art critic, exhibition organizer, and author Anna Goetze, she organized joint exhibitions and participated in various support groups. She became a member of the United Workshops for Art in Crafts 1 in 1910, an organization whose members were concerned with economical design. Von Baczko also served on the board of the Bremen Women's Club from 1917 onward. In 1918 she became a member of the Bremen chapter of the Women's Association for the Promotion of German Fine Arts, and in 1928, she joined Gedok, Europe's oldest and largest network for female artists of all artistic genres, where she tirelessly defended women's rights.

== Selected works ==
In 1906, she designed the entire interior of a children's home, which was built in a former farmhouse in Bremen. This children's home was established for single mothers and working mothers. The press enthusiastically praised her work: "The green-tinted walls, separated from the white ceiling by a delicate frieze, combined with the green linoleum and the white-painted windows and doors, give these rooms such a cozy feel that one immediately feels at home, and it certainly won't be difficult for the children to settle in."

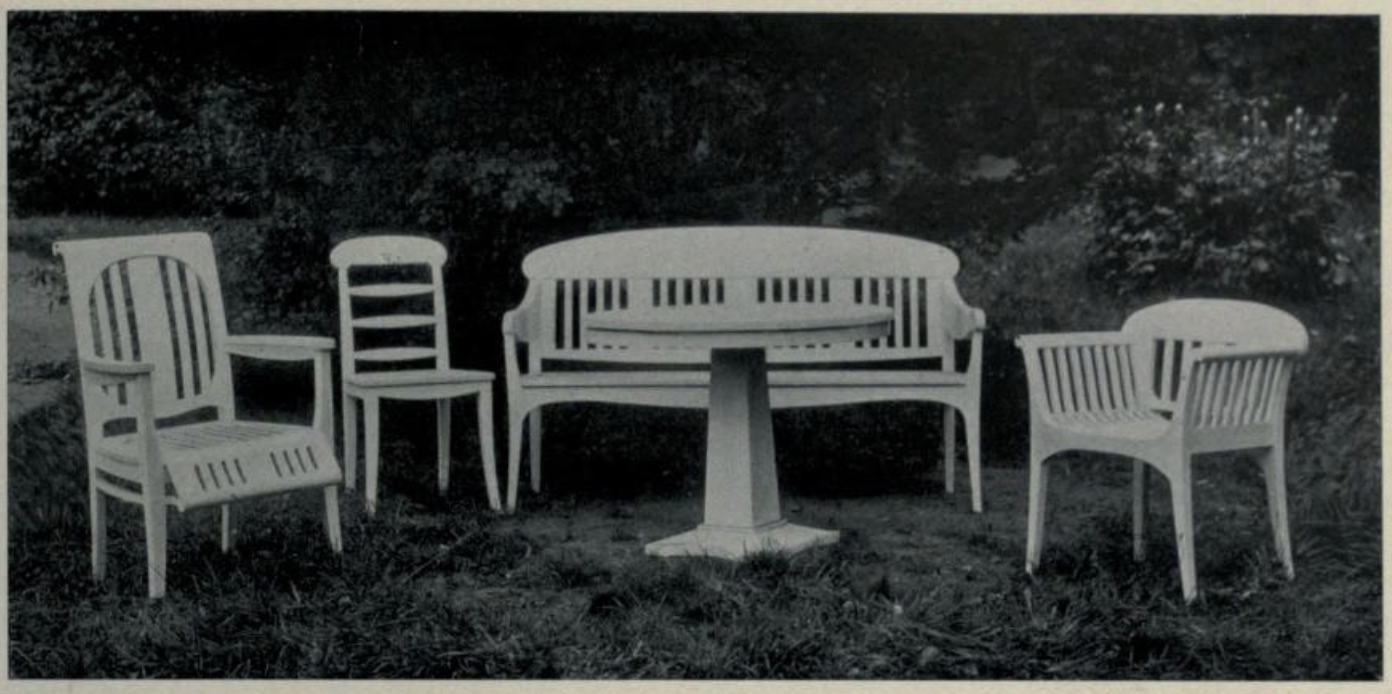
Garden furniture by Elisabeth von Baczko

For the new Red Cross Association Hospital, she designed the furnishings for the sickrooms, children's rooms, and nurses' rooms. The furniture was "mostly painted white and discreetly decorated with small colored stencils, matching the color of the wall paint. By incorporating the mirror into the vanity, this piece also takes on an appealing overall form; in the case of the wardrobe and divan, the effect is based on a finely structured surface. The overall effect is characterized by a bright and healthy cleanliness and harmonious tranquility. Tasteful garden and cane furniture also emerged from the hands of E.v. Baczko, just as she also successfully worked in the field of garden architecture and decorative work."

By gaining public recognition through the efforts of Anna Goetze and the art critic Karl Schäfer, she received many small, but also some large, commissions. She designed children's and garden furniture, music rooms, and ladies' rooms. Her work was based on Biedermeier ideals, showcasing simple, colorfully structured rooms decorated with a few, yet striking pieces of furniture. At the time she was lauded as an expert in a new ethic of living.

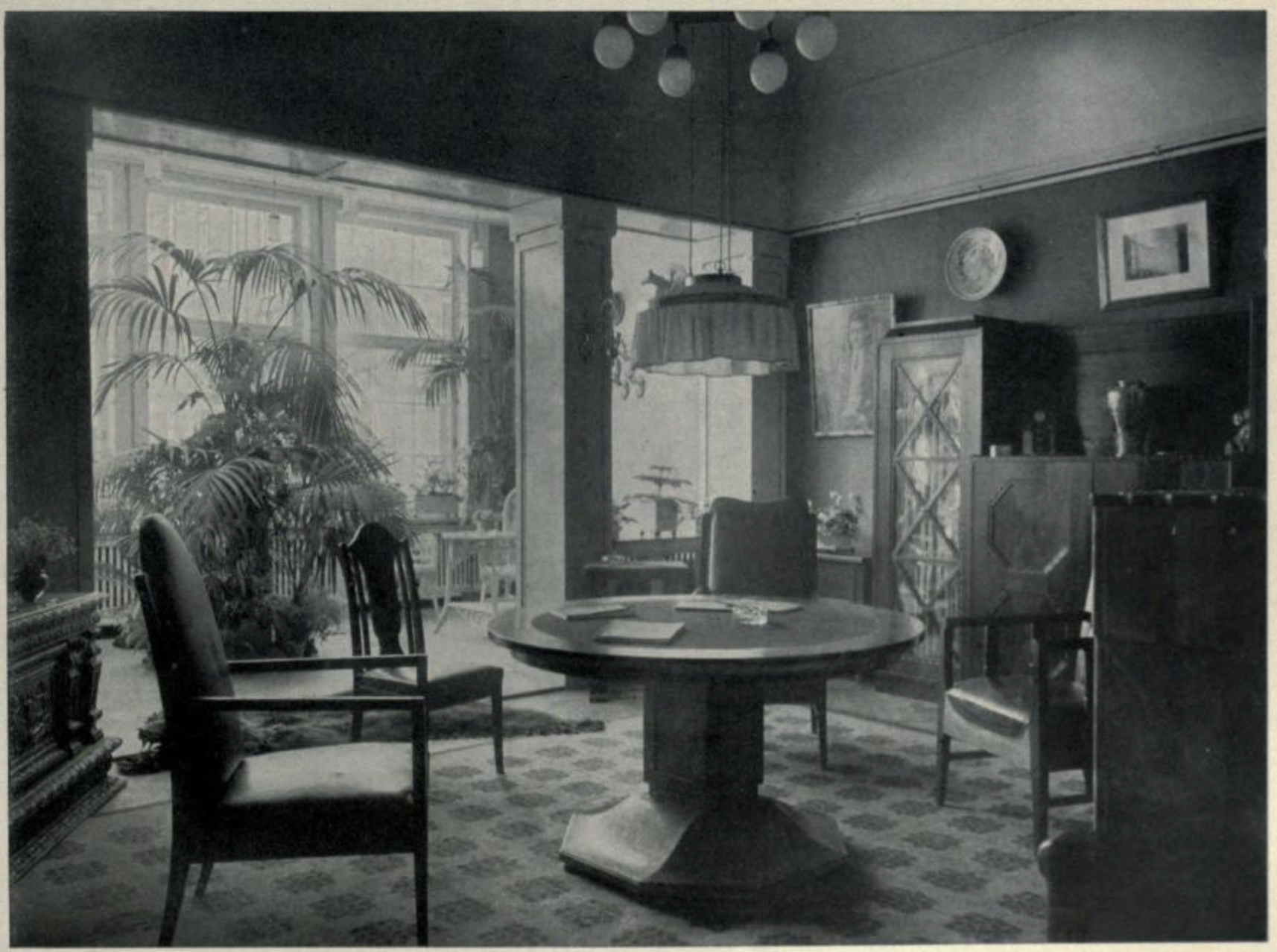
Herrenzimmer - interior design and furniture by Elisabeth von Baczko

In 1933 she moved to Berlin where she recorded her surname as Baszkiewicz.

== Notable works ==
She participated in numerous exhibitions that attracted considerable attention:

- 1905/06 Gewerbemuseum
- 1905/06 Kunstsalon Leuwer
- 1906 International Decorative Arts Exhibition Dresden
- 1907 Worpswede Kunsthalle
- 1909 with H. Vogeler and Felicitas von Baczko at the Gewerbemuseum
- 1910 World Exhibition Brussels
- 1913 Kunsthalle
- 1925 Werkbundtage
