= Gunver Hansen =

Danish architect (born 1943)

- Born: 1943 (age 82–83)
- Education: Royal Danish Academy of Fine Arts
- Occupation: Architect
- Awards: Architizer A+Award
- Practice: Gunver Hansen Tegnestue.

Gunver Hansen (born 1943) is a Danish architect who specializes in architectural lighting design. In addition to projects developed in her own studio, she frequently acts as a consultant for assignments covering outdoor or street lighting developments.

== Biography ==
Hansen studied architecture at the Royal Danish Academy of Fine Arts, graduating in 1967. She then worked in the studio of Jørgen Selchaus Tegnestue from 1967 until 1974, before participating in research at the Royal Academy's School of Architecture until 1980. In 1983, she established her own firm, Gunver Hansen Tegnestue.

Concentrating on lighting, she has completed over 500 projects, many for street lighting or building illumination. Assignments have included new lighting at Copenhagen Central Station (2014), the exterior illumination of Grundtvig's Church (2013) and outdoor lighting in Esbjerg's main square (2011). One of her most recent projects is the coloured LED lighting inside the Bispeengen Tunnel, completed in March 2015.

== Light tunnel ==
The 50-metre long tunnel in central Copenhagen leads to a recycling centre. The project manager, Susanne Felland, from the Amager Ressource Center explained that the objective was to "transform a dull, grey entrance into an experience beyond the expected". The wall paintings inside the tunnel are illuminated and transformed with Hansen's 24 LED spotlights which create dynamic scenes running in a 20-minute loop. Hansen explains that the lights can be programmed and each beam modified for brightness and colour.

== Awards ==
Hansen has received several awards including:

- 2009: Danish Lighting Award (Den Danske Lyspris)
- 2014: MAB14 Media Architecture Award for Energy Tower Facade Lighting
- 2015: Architizer A+Award for her contribution to Erik van Egeraat's Waste to Energy Plant in Roskilde
