= Nadine Isaacs =

Jamaican architect (1942–2004)

- Born: E. Nadine Isaacs; 1942; Colony of Jamaica, British Empire
- Died: 16 June 2004 (aged 61–62); Kingston, Jamaica
- Occupation: architect
- Years active: 1964–2015
- Known for: first female head of the Jamaican Institute of Architects

Nadine Isaacs (1942–2004) was a Jamaican architect. She was the first female vice chair of the Architects Registration Board and the first female president of the Jamaican Institute of Architects. She headed the Caribbean School of Architecture, as its first female leader, as well as leading the faculty of the Built Environment at the University of Technology in Kingston.

== Biography ==
E. Nadine Isaacs was born in Jamaica in 1942 to Ivy and Wills Isaacs. She graduated from the University of Sydney, Australia, with a degree in architecture. She then returned to take a position with the Jamaican Ministry of Housing, working her way up to become the senior executive architect. In the mid-1970s, she worked with the World Bank on projects in conjunction with the Ministry of Housing to improve the availability of low-cost roofing materials. Isaac's job was to assess the requirements needed to meet local conditions as well as price-point concerns. She joined the Sites and Services Division and worked designing and constructing low-cost housing, later joining the Urban Development Corporation before opening her own firm.

In 1986, Isaacs was elected the first female president of the Jamaican Institute of Architects. She was re-elected for a second term in 1987, and that same year, she became vice chair of the newly established Architects Registration Board. In 1999, Isaacs became the first female to head the Caribbean School of Architecture and was the first female fellow of the Jamaican Institute of Architects. She also led the faculty of the Built Environment at the University of Technology in Kingston.

Isaacs died after a lengthy bout with cancer on 16 June 2004 in Kingston, Jamaica. Posthumously, an annual design award is given in her name by the University of Technology.
