= Zoka Zola =

Croatian architect

- Born: Zoka Zola; Rijeka, Croatia
- Occupation: Architecture
- Years active: 1990–present
- Notable work: Zero Energy Glass & Bedolla House and Pfanner House in Chicago

Zoka Zola is a Croatian architect and teacher who operates her own studio in Chicago, Illinois. She has license to work as an architect in the US, the UK, and Croatia. Her most notable work is the Pfanner House for which she received the Home of the Year Award named as the best house in North America by Architecture Magazine. Kenneth Frampton's publication the American Masterworks: Houses of the 20th and 21st Centuries lists this house among the 43 houses constructed in the USA since 1985. She is also a professor at the School of Architecture at University of Illinois, Chicago. Her firm is also involved in design of three zero energy houses of which one is located in Chicago (for which she has received an award) and the other two are in Kuala Lumpur.

== Biography ==
Zola, born in Rijeka, Croatia, graduated in Master of Architecture from the University of Zagreb. She also holds a Master of Arts Program in the Humanities degree from the Division of the Humanities of the University of Chicago. After her education, she worked for many architectural firms in Vienna, Rome, and London. She then established her own firm in London and was involved in the design of minor public buildings and restaurants; during this period she taught at the Oxford Brookes University at Oxford as senior lecturer, and also in the capacity of Unit Master at the Architectural Association in London. In 1995, she was the recipient of "Young Architect of the Year Award" in the United Kingdom.

After Zola moved to Chicago in 1997 she worked as adjunct professor at the School of the Art Institute of Chicago when she won an award for her Pfanner House. Her zero energy house in Chicago is a notable for its adoption to in situ energy generation for sources other than fossil fuel. She was also involved in urban planning of Chicago city, created models for housing and education, a training institution in China training center with hostel faculties, an "infrastructure tower" of 750 ft height in the desert area of California. Her recent project is planning of an economically viable housing complex in Croatia. She is also involved with a zero-carbon training centre and tourist hotel in Hong Kong.

The Zero Energy Glass & Bedolla House designed and built by Zola, though a low end luxury home with lot of space, has blended every available space in the house with solar, wind and geothermal methods (without recourse to fossil fuel energy source) in a "modern-organic-fusion style". The exterior surface of the house is covered with "greenery" that works as thermal insulation in hot or cold weather.

Zola's preference to use of metals in her architectural designs is explained by her: "Our buildings are made of metal but this is not something that many people would think about; metals are the real building blocks of architecture".
