= Nicola Herbst =

Architect in New Zealand

- Occupation: Architect
- Spouse: Lance Herbst
- Awards: Fellow of the New Zealand Institute of Architects

Academic background
- Education: University of Cape Town
- Website: www.herbstarchitects.co.nz

Nicola Herbst is a South African–New Zealand architect, specialising in baches and beach houses using timber, stone and other natural materials. She is a Fellow of the New Zealand Institute of Architects.

== Architectural career ==
Herbst completed her architectural qualifications at the University of Cape Town. She and her husband Lance Herbst emigrated to New Zealand together and have practiced as Herbst Architects since 2000. They are known for "clever refashioning of the Kiwi beach house, or bach", and engaging sensitively with the surrounding environment.

Herbst's Paremoremo House features in the book Making Space: A History of New Zealand Women in Architecture, in the chapter on recent residential architecture. The 2008 house, which can be adjusted to wind and light conditions through the moving of timber screens, is described by Nicole Stock as "less intricate than [Herbst Architect's] other timber jewel-box beach houses." Stock also says "This is the success of Herbst's architecture: she sees the environment as it is, not as we hope it to be. She also sees timber as a material able to be crafted and manipulated into layers and structures that are only vaguely reminiscent of the timber building code, but are innovative and future-focused for their insight and craft".

== Awards ==
Herbst has won the overall Home of the Year Award a number of times, including in 2012, 2016 and 2018. She won the NZIA Housing: Small Projects and Additions award in 2015 for Clevedon Estate. Herbst has been a judge for Home of the Year. Herbst was elected as a Fellow of the New Zealand Institute of Architects.

Herbst Architects' Kawakawa House won the New Zealand Institute of Architects' Sir Ian Athfield Award in 2018. They won the same award in 2023 for their Omata Beach House. The citation for Omata Beach said "The architects clearly have a strong affinity for materials, how they go together, and how things work and — perhaps most importantly — what that feels like for the people who occupy those spaces."

Herbst Architect's 2011 house Under Pohutakawa featured in a BBC show The World's Most Extraordinary Homes.
