= Marine Miroux =

French architect (born 1977)

Marine Miroux (born 14 April 1977) is a French architect who lives and works in Berlin.

She was born in Fontainebleau and qualified as an Architecte diplômé par le gouvernement at the École Nationale Supérieure d'Architecture de Paris-Belleville. In 2008, she founded the collective Berlin Süd Architecture with Christoph Hager.

In 2008, with Christoph Hager, she was made a winner of the ninth iteration of the Europan competition for the duo's project "over the train". In 2010, in partnership with Christoph Hager and Hüller Rudaz Architekten, she received first prize for their project "The Line" in the FLOW competition sponsored by Joël Claisse Architectures, the Urban Land Institute and the businesses of the Port of Brussels. In the same year, she received the Grand prix d'architecture awarded by the French Académie des Beaux-Arts for the project "Better, Cheaper Helping".
