= Vera Bushati =

Albanian architect (born 1946)

Vera Bushati (born 1946) is an Albanian architect, engineer, historian and professor. In 2018, she was recognized for her contributions to the fields of architectural history and urban design in Albania with the Albanian Architecture Prize.

She is the Co-founder of ArchiGames, a card game aimed at inspiring the next generation of architects through education, play, and promoting heritage culture.

She has published several books on Albanian architecture and lectured internationally on the history of Albanian architecture at various universities such as the University of Prishtina, Stockholm University, University of Marburg, and the TU Wien. She has also been involved in several architecture and design projects in Albania and abroad, in places such as Kosovo, Lebanon, and Congo.

== Early life and education ==
Bushati was inspired to study architecture while visiting the coast of Vlora, Albania as a high school student, where she had the idea that it could become a tourist attraction.

Bushati studied at the Faculty of Civil Engineering at the University of Tirana in the field of architecture and construction, graduating in 1969. She completed her doctorate degree at the same university in 1982, focusing on the topic of "Architecture of Houses in Illyria". She specialized at the Sapienza University of Rome on the History of Architecture and Restoration.

== Academic career ==
Bushati began her professional career as an engineer in the construction company “Lushnje”, becoming promoted to chief engineer, a position she held until 1974. Afterwards, she moved onto an academic career at the University of Tirana from 1974 to 1992 as a lecturer, teaching Construction Technology and the History of Architecture and the City. She was the Former Dean of the Faculty of Engineering. She is currently a lecturer at Marin Barleti University in the Department of Architecture at the Faculty of Applied Sciences and Creative Industries.

=== Published works ===
Bushati has published several monographs and texts on Albanian architecture.

- Designing to live: Designers 1945-1990
- Learn the History of Architecture and the City by Playing
- ArchiGames - Learn Architecture by Playing
- History of Albanian Architecture, Vol 1
- History of Albanian Architecture (1912-1944)
- Villas of Tirana
- Dictionary of the History of Architecture

=== Published research ===
- Education IN/BY Architecture
- Tirana and the Urban Imagination: From Genesis to the model metropolitan
- Architecture as the Reading of the City
- Design as a Creative Process
- Dialog with Public Space

== ArchiGames ==
Bushati co-founded ArchiGames with Xhoana Kristo with the vision that people can learn architecture by playing. ArchiGames was part of the third Uplift Accelerator, a startup accelerator program that serves the Western Balkans.

ArchiGames serves parents, kids, citizens and students by learning about architecture through fun and play. Their inspiration was to simulate the education of heritage in children from an early age, by integrating the values of architecture, culture and history of the city in the game. Their goal is to integrate ArchiGames into other well-known cities so that locals and tourists can learn more about the cities and countries they visit.

== Exhibitions ==
- Albania Unfinished
- Tirana Design Week 2015: Design Now
