= Emesé Ijjasz de Murcia =

Colombian architect

Emesé Ijjasz de Murcia (born 18 May 1936) is a Hungarian-born Colombian architect and educator. She studied architecture in Argentina, at the Catholic University in Chile and at the National University of Colombia in Medellín.

Upon finishing her schooling in 1963, she worked in Medellín until 1971, during which time she designed more than 17 dwellings. She moved to Bogotá where she began teaching at the University of Los Andes in 1967, where she was named Vice Dean in 1978. She established her own architectural firm in 1972 with Cecilia Alvarez as a partner. She designed numerous large scale housing developments in Bogotá. She is a member of the Colombian Society of Architects.
