= Filandia Elisa Pizzul =

Argentine architect

- Born: May 22, 1902
- Died: 1987
- Known for: Architecture

Filandia Elisa Pizzul (alternate spelling, Finlandia; also Filandia Pizzul de Mazzocco; 22 May 1902 – 1987) was the first woman to graduate from a school of architecture in Argentina. She organized the library of the Faculty of Architecture of Buenos Aires and was its first director. A room is named after her.

== Biography ==
Pizzul was born in Buenos Aires on 22 May 1902. In 1927, she graduated from the School of Architecture of the University of Buenos Aires becoming the first woman in her country to obtain the title of architect.

In 1928, she began his professional career as assistant commissioner of works in the Nursing Advisory Commission and National Hospital, then under the Ministry of Foreign Affairs, Worship and Charity, becoming the first woman to work in this organization. In the same year, she enrolled in a university course organized by the Civil Aeronautics branch, obtaining the brevet of pilot No. 181.

During her career, she served as Director General of Conservation Workshops and Ministry of Public Health of the Nation, Conservation Director General of the Ministry of Public Works Office, and advisor to the National Director of Architecture.

As a pilot, she was a founding member and president of the University Aviation Center, member of the Center for Civil Aviation, founding member of the Argentina Chamber of Aeronautics and founding partner of the Argentine Albatros Gliding Club.

She was responsible for preparing the blueprints for the creation of Aeroparque Jorge Newbery.

Academically, she organized the library of the Faculty of Architecture at the University of Buenos Aires and was its first director; a room is named after her.

== Bibliography ==
- Udaondo, Enrique (1938). Diccionario biográfico argentino. Buenos Aires: Institución Mitre.
- Piccirilli, Ricardo; Romay, Francisco L.; Gianello, Leoncio (1953). Diccionario histórico argentino. Buenos Aires.
- Cutolo, Vicente Osvaldo (1968). Nuevo diccionario biográfico argentino (1750-1930). Buenos Aires: Editorial Elche.
- Yaben, Jacinto R. (1952). Biografías argentinas y sudamericanas. Buenos Aires: Ediciones Historicas Argentinas.
