= List of American architects =

This list of American architects includes notable architects and architecture firms with a strong connection to the United States (i.e., born in the United States, located in the United States or known primarily for their work in the United States). For a more complete list, see Category:American architects and Category:Architecture firms of the United States.

== Individuals ==
=== A ===
- Julian Abele (1881–1950)
- Constance Abernathy (1931–1994)
- Max Abramovitz (1908–2004)
- Louis Abramson (1887–1985)
- Michel Abboud
- Constance Adams (1964–2018)
- Otto Eugene Adams (1889–1968)
- Ruth Maxon Adams (1883–1970)
- Dankmar Adler (1844–1900)
- David Adler (1882–1949)
- Charles N. Agree (1897–1982)
- Diana Agrest (born 1945)
- Walter W. Ahlschlager (1887–1965)
- Gregory Ain (1908–1988)
- Harrison Albright (1866–1932)
- Charles Ronald Aldrich (1866–1939)
- Chester Holmes Aldrich (1871–1940)
- William Van Alen (1883–1954)
- Christopher Alexander (1936–2022)
- Claire Allen (1853–1942)
- Frank Shaver Allen (1860–1934)
- Stan Allen
- Mary Almy (1883–1967)
- Norman W. Alpaugh (1885–1954)
- Alfred S. Alschuler (1876–1940)
- Joe Amisano (1917–2008)
- Frederick J. Amsden (1841–1906)
- Lawrence B. Anderson (1906–1994)
- Albert Anis (1889–1964)
- Paola Antonelli (born 1963)
- Michael Arad (born 1969)
- Siah Armajani (1939–2020)
- Harris Armstrong (1899–1973)
- Hisham N. Ashkouri (1948–2025)
- Grosvenor Atterbury (1869–1956)
- Charles B. Atwood (1849–1895)
- Alice Constance Austin (1862–1955)
- Henry Austin (1804–1891)
- John C. Austin (1870–1963)
- George Awsumb (1880–1959)
- Elizabeth Ayer (1897–1987)
- Atlee B. Ayres (1873–1969)

=== B ===
- Edmund Bacon (1910–2005)
- Henry Bacon (1866–1924)
- Sidney Badgley (1850–1917)
- Steve Baer (1938–2024)
- Ephraim Francis Baldwin (1837–1916)
- Clifford Balch (1880–1963)
- Garnet Baltimore (1859–1946)
- George Franklin Barber (1854–1915)
- Edward Larrabee Barnes (1915–2004)
- Thomas P. Barnett (1870–1929)
- Carol Ross Barney (born 1949)
- Nora Stanton Barney (1883–1971)
- Armand Phillip Bartos (1910–2005)
- Karen Bausman (born 1958)
- Welton Becket (1902–1969)
- Claud Beelman (1883–1963)
- Ann Beha (born 1950)
- Walter Curt Behrendt (1884–1945)
- Pietro Belluschi (1899–1994)
- Tom Bender (1941–2020)
- Frederick Staples Benedict (1861–1936)
- Asher Benjamin (1773–1845)
- John Virginius Bennes (1867–1943)
- Edward H. Bennett (1874–1954)
- Laura Bennett (born 1963)
- George Bergstrom (1876–1955)
- Louise Blanchard Bethune (1856–1915)
- Joseph Stillman Blake (1835–1898)
- Henry Forbes Bigelow (1867–1929)
- Phyllis Birkby (1932–1994)
- Gunnar Birkerts (1925–2017)
- Norma Bonniwell (1877–1961)
- William W. Bosworth (1869–1966)
- India Boyer (1907–1998)
- William W. Boyington (1818–1898)
- Nathaniel Jeremiah Bradlee (1829–1888)
- Claude Fayette Bragdon (1866–1946)
- Markus Breitschmid (born 1966)
- Marcel Breuer (1902–1981)
- Lilian Bridgman (1866–1948)
- Herman Brookman (1891–1973)
- Arthur Brown Jr. (1874–1957)
- Debra M. Brown (born 1963)
- Denise Scott Brown (born 1931)
- Will Bruder (born 1946)
- Emma Brunson (1887–1980)
- Gridley J. F. Bryant (1816–1899)
- Leland A. Bryant (1890–1954)
- Merritt Bucholz (born 1966)
- Katharine Budd (1860–1951)
- Charles Buek
- Temple Hoyne Buell (1895–1990)
- Charles Bulfinch (1763–1844)
- Roger Bullard (1884–1935)
- Orin M. Bullock Jr. (1905–1994)
- Gordon Bunshaft (1909–1990)
- Buttrick White & Burtis
- John Burgee (born 1933)
- Daniel Burnham (1846–1912)
- Pamela Burton (born 1948)
- Wright Butler
- Tom Butt
- Emily Helen Butterfield (1884–1958)
- Miles Brittelle (1894–1970)
- Sinclair Black

=== C ===
- Edward Clarke Cabot (1818–1901)
- Elizabeth Cadbury-Brown (1922–2002)
- Walker O. Cain (1915–1993)
- Santiago Calatrava (born 1951)
- Alfred Caldwell (1903–1998)
- Peter Calthorpe (born 1949)
- Rosario Candela (1890–1953)
- Charles L. Carson (1847–1891)
- Albert Cassell (1895–1969)
- Ann R. Chaintreuil (born 1947)
- Theophilus P. Chandler Jr. (1845–1928)
- Josephine Wright Chapman (1867–1943)
- Serge Chermayeff (1900–1996)
- Mario J. Ciampi (1907–2006)
- Stephen Child (1866–1936)
- David Childs (1941–2025)
- Birge Clark (1893–1989)
- Nicholas J. Clayton (1840–1916)
- Stiles O. Clements (1883–1966)
- Brad Cloepfil (born 1956)
- Elizabeth Close (1912–2011)
- Adolf Cluss (1825–1905)
- Matthew Coates
- Henry Ives Cobb (1859–1931)
- Ogden Codman Jr. (1863–1951)
- John M. Cooper (1885–1954)
- Jack Corgan (died 2000)
- Charles Howard Crane (1885–1952)
- H. Page Cross (1910–1975)
- Marian Cruger Coffin (1876–1957)
- Preston Scott Cohen
- Elizabeth Coit (1892–1987)
- Doris Cole (born 1938)
- Mary Colter (1869–1958)
- Ralph Adams Cram (1863–1942)
- C. Howard Crane (1885–1952)
- Paul Philippe Cret (1876–1945)
- Richard L. Crowther (1910–2006)
- Charles Amos Cummings (1833–1905)
- Alexander Curlett (1881–1942)
- William Curlett (1846–1914)
- Kirtland Cutter (1860–1939)
- Arthur Cogswell (1930–2010)
- Devendra Contractor

=== D ===
- Alexander Jackson Davis (1803–1892)
- Howard Davis
- Mary Lund Davis (1922–2008)
- Pierpont Davis (1884–1953)
- Walter Swindell Davis (1887–1973)
- Zachary Taylor Davis (1869–1946)
- William Adams Delano (1874–1960)
- Edward Buehler Delk (1885–1956)
- Frederic Joseph DeLongchamps (1882–1969)
- Neil Denari (born 1957)
- Oliver Perry Dennis (1858–1927)
- Constant-Désiré Despradelle (1862–1912)
- Thomas Dixon (1819–1886)
- William J. Dodd (1862–1930)
- Thomas Doerr (born 1964)
- John M. Donaldson (1854–1941)
- Edward W. Donn Jr. (1868–1953)
- A. E. Doyle (1877–1928)
- Henrietta Cuttino Dozier (1872–1947)
- David Owen Dryden (1877–1946)
- Roger Duffy
- John H. Duncan (1855–1929)
- Michael Middleton Dwyer
- Arthur Dyson (born 1940)

=== E ===
- Charles Eames (1907–1978)
- Ray Eames (1912–1988)
- Keller Easterling
- John Eberson (1875–1954)
- Garrett Eckbo (1910–2000)
- Abram M. Edelman (1863–1941)
- Judith Edelman (1923–2014)
- Leopold Eidlitz (1823–1908)
- Percy A. Eisen (1885–1946)
- Peter Eisenman (born 1932)
- John Eisenmann (1851–1924)
- Thomas Harlan Ellett (1880–1951)
- Craig Ellwood (1922–1992)
- George Grant Elmslie (1869–1952)
- William Ralph Emerson (1833–1917)
- Aymar Embury II (1880–1966)
- Walter E. Erkes (1884–1961)
- Joseph Esherick (1914–1998)
- Hiawatha Estes (1918–2003)
- Manoug Exerjian (1888–1974)
- Peter Exley (born 1964)
- Wilson Eyre (1858–1944)

=== F ===
- Beatrix Farrand (1872–1959)
- Lyman Farwell (1864–1933)
- Alfred T. Fellheimer (1875–1959)
- Hugh Ferriss (1889–1962)
- Bill Finch (1913–2003)
- Maurice Herman Finkel (1888–1949)
- Frederick B. Fisher
- Thornton Fitzhugh (1864–1933)
- Ernest Flagg (1857–1947)
- Jean B. Fletcher (1915–1965)
- Norman Fletcher (1917–2007)
- Paul Florian (born 1950)
- Friedrich St. Florian (1932–2024)
- William H. Folsom (1815–1901)
- O'Neil Ford (1905–1982)
- Richard Foster (1919–2002)
- Anne Fougeron (born 1955)
- Bruce Fowle
- Eric Corey Freed (born 1970)
- James Ingo Freed (1930–2005)
- Harry Livingston French (1871–1928)
- Helen French (1900–1994)
- Albert Frey (1903–1998)
- Margaret Fritsch (1899–1993)
- Buckminster Fuller (1895–1983)
- Ethel Furman (1893–1976)
- Frank Furness (1839–1912)

=== G ===
- T. Charles Gaastra (1879–1947)
- Jeanne Gang (born 1964)
- Frederick W. Garber (1877–1950)
- Alexander Garvin (1941–2021)
- Norman Bel Geddes (1893–1958)
- Frank Gehry (1929–2025)
- Frank Genese
- Art Gensler (1935–2021)
- Arthur U. Gerber (1878–1960)
- Preston Geren Sr. (1891–1969)
- Preston Geren Jr. (1923–2013)
- Cass Gilbert (1859–1934)
- Alfred Giles (1853–1920)
- Paul Gilger (born 1954)
- Irving Gill (1870–1936)
- Arthur D. Gilman (1821–1882)
- Madeline Gins (1941–2014)
- Alfred Morton Githens (1876–1973)
- Romaldo Giurgola (1920–2016)
- Frederick Godley (1886–1961)
- Bruce Goff (1904–1982)
- Henry L. Gogerty (1894–1990)
- Bertrand Goldberg (1913–1997)
- Moise H. Goldstein Sr. (1882−1972)
- Bertram Goodhue (1869–1924)
- Joan E. Goody (1935–2009)
- Philip L. Goodwin (1885–1958)
- James Riely Gordon (1863–1937)
- Ferdinand Gottlieb (1919–2007)
- Carl Graffunder (1919–2013)
- Bruce Graham (1925–2010)
- Ernest R. Graham (1868–1936)
- Michael Graves (1934–2015)
- Rose Greely (1887–1969)
- Howard Greenley (1874–1963)
- Marion Mahony Griffin (1871–1961)
- Walter Burley Griffin (1876–1937)
- Walter Gropius (1883–1969)
- Henry Grow (1817–1891)
- Victor Gruen (1903–1980)
- Graham Gund (1940–2025)
- Charles Gwathmey (1938–2009)

=== H ===
- Kenneth Haggard (born 1935)
- Charles C. Haight (1841–1917)
- Leola Hall (1881–1930)
- Lawrence Halprin (1916–2009)
- Frances Halsband (born 1943)
- Alfred Dwight Foster Hamlin (1855–1926)
- Gary Haney (born 1955)
- Samuel Hannaford (1835–1911)
- Olof Hanson (1862–1933)
- Alan Hantman (born 1942)
- Henry Janeway Hardenbergh (1847–1918)
- John C. Harkness (1916–2016)
- Sarah P. Harkness (1914–2013)
- Arthur Loomis Harmon (1878–1958)
- Harwell Hamilton Harris (1903–1990)
- Ralph C. Harris
- Peter Harrison (1716–1775)
- Richard Arnett Harrison (1924–1995)
- Wallace Harrison (1895–1981)
- John A. Hasecoster (1844–1925)
- Jane Hastings (1928–2024)
- Thomas Hastings (1860–1929)
- Ralph Haver (1915–1987)
- John Haviland (1792–1852)
- Sophia Hayden (1868–1953)
- William S. Hebbard (1863–1930)
- John Hejduk (1929–2000)
- Margaret Helfand (1947–2007)
- Frances Henley (c. 1896–1955)
- David Randall Hertz (born 1960)
- David Heymann
- James Hoban (1755–1831)
- Chuck Hoberman (born 1956)
- F. Burrall Hoffman (1882–1980)
- John Augur Holabird (1886–1945)
- William Holabird (1854–1923)
- Steven Holl (born 1947)
- Philip W. Holler (1869–1942)
- Emily Elizabeth Holman (1854–1925)
- Henry K. Holsman (1866–1963)
- Raymond Hood (1881–1934)
- Mary Rockwell Hook (1877–1978)
- Van Dorn Hooker (1921–2015)
- Henry Hornbostel (1867–1961)
- Benjamin Bean Horner (1893–1971)
- Lance Hosey (1964–2021)
- John Galen Howard (1864–1931)
- Lois Howe (1864–1964)
- John Mead Howells (1868–1959)
- Frank Dale Hudson (1868–1941)
- Charles Evans Hughes III (1915–1985)
- Robert H.H. Hugman (1902–1980)
- Myron Hunt (1868–1952)
- Richard Morris Hunt (1827–1895)
- Sumner Hunt (1865–1938)
- I. Vernon Hill (1872–1904)
- Brian Healy

=== I ===
- Wilbur R. Ingalls Jr. (1923−1997)
- Harriet Irwin (1828–1897)

=== J ===
- Joseph Jacobberger (1869–1930)
- Norman Jaffe (1932–1993)
- Helmut Jahn (1940–2021)
- Hina Jamelle
- Mary Rutherfurd Jay (1872–1953)
- Thomas Jefferson (1743–1826)
- J. T. W. Jennings (1856-1944)
- William Le Baron Jenney (1832–1907)
- Jon Jerde (1940–2015)
- Mitchell Joachim (born 1972)
- Alice E. Johnson (1862–1936)
- Folger Johnson (1882–1970)
- Philip Johnson (1906–2005)
- Clarence H. Johnston Sr. (1859–1936)
- A. Quincy Jones (1913–1979)
- E. Fay Jones (1921–2004)
- Edward Vason Jones (1909–1980)
- Grant Jones (1938–2021)
- Rick Joy (born 1958)
- Carey Jenkins (Died 1987)

=== K ===
- Albert Kahn (1869–1942)
- Ely Jacques Kahn (1884–1972)
- Louis I. Kahn (1901–1974)
- Louis Kamper (1861–1953)
- Gordon Kaufmann (1888–1949)
- Michelle Kaufmann
- Paffard Keatinge-Clay (1926–2023)
- Anna Keichline (1889–1943)
- George W. Keller (1842–1935)
- Nathan Kelley (1808–1871)
- Arthur R. Kelly (1878–1959)
- Fay Kellogg (1871–1918)
- Kendrick Bangs Kellogg (1934–2024)
- C. C. Kemble (1831–1899)
- Raymond M. Kennedy (1891–1976)
- Kevin Kennon (born 1958)
- Paul A. Kennon (1934–1990)
- Pierre Yves Kéralum (1817–1872)
- George Kessler (1862–1923)
- Hugh T. Keyes (1888–1963)
- Nader Khalili (1936–2008)
- Frederick John Kiesler (1890–1965)
- Francis Kimball (1845–1919)
- Thomas Rogers Kimball (1862–1934)
- Richard D. King (1879–1945)
- Albert Hamilton Kipp (1850–1906)
- Dan Kirby
- Otto Kleemann (1855–1936)
- Henry John Klutho (1873–1964)
- Florence Knoll (1917–2019)
- Austin Eldon Knowlton (1909–2003)
- Carl Koch (1912–1998)
- Pierre Koenig (1925–2004)
- Robert D. Kohn (1870–1953)
- John Paul Krempel (1861–1933)
- Justus F. Krumbein (1847–1907)
- Tom Kundig (born 1954)
- Ezra F. Kysor (1835–1907)

=== L ===
- John C. Lahey (born 1953)
- H. Rafael Lake (1894–1958)
- Charles Rollinson Lamb (1860–1942)
- Thomas W. Lamb (1871–1942)
- William F. Lamb (1893–1952)
- G. Albert Lansburgh (1876–1969)
- Morris Lapidus (1902–2001)
- Paul László (1900–1993)
- John Latenser Sr. (1858–1936)
- Benjamin Henry Latrobe (1764–1820)
- John Lautner (1911–1994)
- Ellis F. Lawrence (1879–1946)
- Charles Downing Lay (1877–1956)
- Ellamae Ellis League (1899–1991)
- Napoleon LeBrun (1821–1901)
- Albert C. Ledner (1924–2017)
- Robert Emmett Lee (1870–1925)
- S. Charles Lee (1899–1990)
- William Harold Lee (1884–1971)
- Gene Leedy (1928–2018)
- Andrea Leers
- William Lescaze (1896–1969)
- Daniel Libeskind (born 1946)
- Detlef Lienau (1818–1887)
- Maya Lin (born 1959)
- Gordon W. Lloyd (1832–1904)
- Robert Cary Long Jr. (1810–1849)
- Alexander Wadsworth Longfellow Jr. (1854–1934)
- Ivenue Love-Stanley
- Guy Lowell (1870–1927)
- Elizabeth Lowrey
- Clarence Sumner Luce (1852–1924)
- Charles Luckman (1909–1999)
- Florence Luscomb (1887–1985)
- Greg Lynn (born 1964)

=== M ===
- Kenneth A. MacDonald Jr. (1880–1937)
- Charles Donagh Maginnis (1867–1955)
- Harold Van Buren Magonigle (1867–1935)
- George W. Maher (1864–1926)
- Michael Maltzan (born 1959)
- Marion Manley (1893–1984)
- Albert C. Martin Sr. (1879–1960)
- Joe Mashburn
- George D. Mason (1856–1948)
- Roy Mason (1938–1996)
- Rick Mather (1937–2013)
- Walter J. Mathews (1850–1947)
- Victor Andre Matteson (1872–1951)
- Bernard Maybeck (1862–1957)
- Thom Mayne (born 1944)
- Wayne McAllister (1907–2000)
- Ida McCain (1884–1949)
- John McComb Jr. (1763–1853)
- Ernest McConnell
- Margaret McCurry
- William McDonough (born 1951)
- Duncan McDuffie (1877–1951)
- Samuel McIntire (1757–1811)
- Charles Follen McKim (1847–1909)
- James W. McLaughlin (1834–1923)
- Louis A. McMillen (1916–1998)
- Marcia Mead (1879–1967)
- William Rutherford Mead (1846–1928)
- Milton Bennett Medary (1874–1929)
- John Gaw Meem (1894–1983)
- Richard Meier (born 1934)
- Frank L. Meline (1875–1944)
- Elise Mercur (1864–1947)
- John William Merrow (1874–1927)
- Gabriel S. Meyer (1874–1955)
- Ludwig Mies van der Rohe (1886–1969)
- Gladys Jacqueline Miller (1926–1993)
- James Rupert Miller (1869–1946)
- Robert Mills (1781–1855)
- Henry A. Minton (1883–1948)
- Addison Mizner (1872–1933)
- Samuel Mockbee (1944–2001)
- Roger Montgomery (1925–2003)
- Harriet Moody (1891–1966)
- Tom Morbitzer (born 1974)
- Arthur Cotton Moore (1935–2022)
- Charles Moore (1925–1993)
- Lester S. Moore (1871–1924)
- Julia Morgan (1872–1957)
- Toshiko Mori (born 1951)
- Benjamin Wistar Morris (1870–1944)
- Gertrude Comfort Morrow (c. 1888–1983)
- Robert Moses (1888–1981)
- Eric Owen Moss (born 1943)
- Michel Mossessian (born 1959)
- Hidalgo Moya (1920–1994)
- Frederick Augustus Muhlenberg (1887–1980)
- Edla Muir (1906–1971)
- William A.O. Munsell (1866–1944)
- Robert Murase (1938–2005)
- Kenneth MacKenzie Murchison (1872–1938)
- Charles Murphy (1890–1985)
- Henry Murphy (1877–1954)
- Elijah E. Myers (1832–1909)
- Owen McGlynn (1878–1918)

=== N ===
- Patricia Saldaña Natke (born 1964)
- Francis Augustus Nelson (1878–1950)
- Walter Netsch (1920–2008)
- Richard Neutra (1892–1970)
- John Rudolph Niernsee (1814–1885)
- Fred Earl Norris Jr. (1923–2006)
- Samuel Tilden Norton (1877–1959)
- John Notman (1810–1865)

=== O ===
- Gyo Obata (1923–2022)
- Frederick J. Osterling (1865–1934)

=== P ===
- Mary L. Page (1849–1921)
- Charles Souders Paget (1874–1933)
- Tician Papachristou (1928–2018)
- Mother Joseph Pariseau (1823–1902)
- Alfred Browning Parker (1916–2011)
- Jamieson Parker (1895–1939)
- John and Donald Parkinson
- André Parmentier (1780–1830)
- Alexander Parris (1780–1852)
- Samuel Parsons (1844–1923)
- Arthur Peabody (1858–1942)
- Robert Swain Peabody (1845–1917)
- I. M. Pei (1917–2019)
- César Pelli (1926–2019)
- William Pereira (1909–1985)
- Dwight H. Perkins (1867–1941)
- Emile G. Perrot (1872–1954)
- Nelle Peters (1884–1974)
- William Wesley Peters (1912–1991)
- Eleanore Pettersen (1916–2003)
- Alberta Pfeiffer (1899–1994)
- Timothy L. Pflueger (1892–1946)
- Wade Hampton Pipes (1877–1961)
- Elizabeth Plater-Zyberk (born 1950)
- Charles A. Platt (1861–1933)
- Charles F. Plummer (1879–1939)
- Thomas Podmore (1859–1948)
- Benjamin Polk (1916–2001)
- Willis Polk (1867–1924)
- James Polshek (1930–2022)
- Mónica Ponce de León
- John Russell Pope (1874–1937)
- Cyrus Kinne Porter (1828–1910)
- John C. Portman Jr. (1924–2017)
- George B. Post (1837–1913)
- George M. Post (1883–1966)
- Antoine Predock (1936–2024)
- William G. Preston (1842–1910)
- Bruce Price (1845–1903)
- William Lightfoot Price (1861–1916)
- B. Marcus Priteca (1889–1971)
- William Gray Purcell (1880–1965)
- Roswell Field Putnam (1840–1911)

=== R ===
- George Ranalli (born 1946)
- Ralph Rapson (1914–2008)
- Wallace Rayfield (1874–1941)
- Eleanor Raymond (1887–1989)
- Robert Reamer (1873–1938)
- Florence Kenyon Hayden Rector (1882–1973)
- Neel Reid (1885–1926)
- James Renwick Jr. (1818–1895)
- Herbert W. Rhodes (1886–1956)
- Lilian Jeannette Rice (1889–1938)
- Henry Hobson Richardson (1838–1886)
- Theodate Pope Riddle (1867–1946)
- Lutah Maria Riggs (1896–1984)
- Isabel Roberts (1871–1955)
- Robert S. Roeschlaub (1843–1923)
- Kevin Roche (1922–2019)
- Martin Roche (1853–1927)
- Annie Rockfellow (1866–1954)
- David Rockwell (born 1956)
- Simon Rodia (1879–1965)
- John A. Roebling (1806–1869)
- Isaiah Rogers (1800–1869)
- James Gamble Rogers (1867–1947)
- John Wellborn Root (1850–1891)
- John Wellborn Root Jr. (1887–1963)
- James C. Rose (1913–1991)
- Alfred Rosenheim (1859–1943)
- Albert Randolph Ross (1868–1948)
- T. Paterson Ross (1873–1957)
- Carol Ross Barney (born 1949)
- Arthur Rotch (1850–1894)
- Emery Roth (1871–1948)
- Michael Rotondi (born 1949)
- Wirt C. Rowland (1878–1946)
- Paul Rudolph (1918–1997)
- Sigrid Lorenzen Rupp (1943–2004)
- Edward B. Rust (1883–1958)
- Ida Annah Ryan (1873–1950)
- Robert Rheinlander (1880–1961)
- John T. Rowland (1871–1945)
- Rene Rivierre (1898–1953)
- Doug Rucker

=== S ===
- Eero Saarinen (1910–1961)
- Eliel Saarinen (1873–1950)
- Hideo Sasaki (1919–2000)
- Lawrence Scarpa (born 1959)
- Anna Pendleton Schenck (1874–1915)
- Rudolph Schindler (1887–1953)
- Emil Schacht (1854–1926)
- Steven J. Schloeder (born 1960)
- Charles Sumner Schneider (1874–1932)
- Der Scutt (1934–2010)
- Edward Francis Searles (1841–1920)
- Werner Seligmann (1930–1998)
- Josep Lluís Sert (1902–1983)
- H. Craig Severance (1879–1941)
- Robert Seyfarth (1878–1950)
- Howard Van Doren Shaw (1869–1926)
- George Foster Shepley (1860–1903)
- Richmond Shreve (1877–1946)
- Cincinnatus Shryock (1816–1888)
- Gideon Shryock (1802–1880)
- Mathias Shryock (1774–1833)
- Edward F. Sibbert (1889–1982)
- Joseph Lyman Silsbee (1848–1913)
- Veldon Simpson
- Norma Sklarek (1926–2012)
- Samuel Sloan (1815–1884)
- Adrian Smith (born 1944)
- Chloethiel Woodard Smith (1910–1992)
- Howard Dwight Smith (1886–1958)
- Lewis Arthur Smith (1869–1958)
- Robert Smith (1722–1777)
- Paolo Soleri (1919–2013)
- Raphael Soriano (1904–1988)
- Michael Sorkin (1948–2020)
- Duncan G. Stroik (born 1962)
- Sumner Spaulding (1892–1952)
- Laurinda Hope Spear (born 1950)
- Joseph Evans Sperry (1854–1930)
- Robert Stacy-Judd (1884–1975)
- John Goddard Stearns Jr. (1843–1917)
- William L. Steele (1875–1949)
- Victor Steinbrueck (1911–1985)
- Martin Stern Jr. (1917–2001)
- Robert A. M. Stern (1939–2025)
- John Calvin Stevens (1855–1940)
- J. George Stewart (1890–1970)
- Gustav Stickley (1858–1942)
- Francis Marion Stokes (1883–1975)
- Isaac Newton Phelps Stokes (1867–1944)
- Edward Durell Stone (1902–1978)
- William Strickland (1788–1854)
- John Hubbard Sturgis (1834–1888)
- Richard Clipston Sturgis (1860–1951)
- Louis Sullivan (1856–1924)
- Matthew Sullivan (1868–1948)
- Sarah Susanka (born 1957)
- Paul Steelman (born 1955)
- Edwin Lewis Snyder (1887–1969)
- Claude Stroller (1921–2023)

=== T ===
- Edgar Tafel (1912–2011)
- Vertner Tandy (1885–1949)
- Robert Robinson Taylor (1868–1942)
- Thomas Alexander Tefft (1826–1859)
- Benjamin C. Thompson (1918–2002)
- Jane Thompson (1927–2016)
- Polly Povey Thompson (1904–1994)
- William Thornton (1759–1828)
- Todd Tibbals (1910–1988)
- Gustav, William, and Charles Tifal
- George Thomas Tilden (1845–1919)
- Edward Lippincott Tilton (1861–1933)
- Stanley Tigerman (1930–2019)
- Brentwood S. Tolan (1855–1923)
- John Almy Tompkins II (1871–1941)
- John E. Tourtellotte (1869–1939)
- Ithiel Town (1784–1844)
- Robert Farquhar Train (1869–1951)
- Harrison B. Traver (1881–1973)
- John Trautwine (1810–1883)
- Horace Trumbauer (1868–1938)
- William Tubby (1858–1944)
- Michael G. Turnbull (born 1949)
- William Tuthill (1855–1929)
- Anne Tyng (1920–2011)
- Barry Thalden
- Marc Thorpe

=== U ===
- Richard Upjohn (1802–1878)
- Gilbert Stanley Underwood (1890–1960)
- Joseph Urban (1872–1933)

=== V ===
- Michael Van Valkenburgh (born 1951)
- Henry Vaughan (1845–1917)
- Calvert Vaux (1824–1895)
- Edward L. Varney (1914–1998)
- Robert Venturi (1925–2018)
- Arthur H. Vinal (1854–1923)
- Edward A. Vincent (c. 1825–1856)
- Rafael Viñoly (1944–2023)
- Robert von Ezdorf (1889–1956)
- William Merrell Vories (1880–1964)

=== W ===
- Richard A. Waite (1848–1911)
- Albert R. Walker (1881–1958)
- Ralph Thomas Walker (1889–1973)
- Thomas U. Walter (1804–1887)
- Roland A. Wank (1898–1970)
- William Robert Ware (1832–1915)
- Russell Warren (1783–1860)
- Hazel Wood Waterman (1865–1948)
- Richard C. Watkins (1858–1941)
- W. H. Weeks (1864–1936)
- Ben Weese (1929–2024)
- Harry Weese (1915–1998)
- Joseph Morrill Wells (1853–1890)
- Eugene Weston Jr
- Lewis Eugene Weston
- Carl Jules Weyl (1890–1948)
- Edmund M. Wheelwright (1854–1912)
- F. Manson White (1863–1952)
- Lawrence Grant White (1887–1956)
- Stanford White (1853–1906)
- Morris H. Whitehouse (1878–1944)
- Charles Frederick Whittlesey (1867–1941)
- Peter B. Wight (1838–1925)
- Leila Ross Wilburn (1885–1967)
- David L. Williams (1866–1937)
- Emily Williams (1869–1942)
- E. Stewart Williams (1909–2005)
- Paul Williams (1894–1980)
- Robert Edmund Williams (1874–1960)
- Warren Heywood Williams (1844–1888)
- Beverly Willis (1928–2023)
- Royal Barry Wills (1895–1962)
- James Wines (born 1932)
- Waddy Butler Wood (1869–1944)
- Alfred W. Woods (1857–1942)
- Evans Woollen III (1927–2016)
- William Lee Woollett (1873–1955)
- Edmund Woolley (c. 1695–1771)
- Frank Lloyd Wright (1867–1959)
- Lloyd Wright (1890–1978)
- Catherine Bauer Wurster (1905–1964)
- William Wurster (1895–1973)
- James Bosley Noel Wyatt (1847–1926)
- George Wyman (1860–1939)

=== Y ===
- Minoru Yamasaki (1912–1986)
- Ammi B. Young (1798–1874)
- Helen Binkerd Young (1877–1959)
- Robert Brown Young (1854–1914)

=== Z ===
- Ozias M. Zander (1848–1940)
- Astra Zarina (1929–2008)
- Liane Zimbler (1892–1987)
- R. Harold Zook (1889–1949)
- Paul Zucker (1888–1971)
- Elizabeth Plater-Zyberk (1950)

== Firms ==
- Berlinghof And Davis
- Blank Studio Design + Architecture
- Brooks + Scarpa
- Carrère and Hastings
- Corgan
- Davis & Davis
- Diller Scofidio + Renfro
- Fisher, Lake and Traver
- Gannon and Hands
- Gluckman Tang Architects
- Graft
- Graham, Anderson, Probst & White
- Greene and Greene
- Guilbert and Betelle
- Helfensteller, Hirsch & Watson (founded 1903)
- Hellmuth, Obata and Kassabaum
- Howells & Stokes
- Hudson & Munsell
- Johnsen Schmaling Architects
- Koning Eizenberg Architecture, Inc.
- Kohn Pedersen Fox
- Krueck and Sexton Architects
- Lamb and Rich
- Line and Space
- Marshall and Fox
- Mayers Murray & Phillip
- McKim, Mead & White
- Meyer and Holler
- Morgan, Walls and Clements
- Norton and Wallis
- Parkinson and Parkinson
- Peabody and Stearns
- Perkins and Will
- Peter Tolkin Architecture
- Reid & Reid
- Schultze and Weaver
- Shepley, Rutan and Coolidge
- Shreve, Lamb & Harmon
- Skidmore, Owings and Merrill
- Steele, Sandham and Steele
- Tifal brothers
- Train & Williams
- Trost & Trost
- Walker and Eisen
- Warren and Wetmore
- Weeks and Day
- Weiss/Manfredi
- Tod Williams Billie Tsien Architects
- Woollen, Molzan and Partners

== See also ==
- Architecture of the United States
- List of architects
- Lists of Americans
- List of women architects § United States
- List of African-American architects
