= Dan Kirby =

Dan Kirby may refer to:

- Dan Kirby (architect), American architect
- Dan Kirby (politician), American politician
