= Hyde Park Bank =

Hyde Park Bank is the name for three banks and bank structures in the United States:

- Hyde Park Co-operative Bank is a bank based in Hyde Park, Massachusetts.
- Hyde Park-Kenwood National Bank Building is a landmarked building (1929) that houses a Chicago, Illinois bank.
- Hyde Park Savings Bank is another bank based in Hyde Park, Massachusetts.
