= Rivierre =

Rivierre is a French surname. Notable people with the surname include:

- Françoise Ozanne-Rivierre (1941–2007), French linguist
- Gaston Rivierre (1862–1942), French cyclist
- Rene Rivierre (1898–1953), American architect
