= Charles Paget =

Charles Paget may refer to:

- Charles Paget (conspirator) (c. 1546–1612), Roman Catholic conspirator
- Sir Charles Paget (Royal Navy officer) (1778–1839), MP and vice-admiral
- Sir Charles Paget (politician) (1799–1873), MP for Nottingham in the 1850s
- Charles Souders Paget (1874–1933), American architect in Canton, China
- Charles Paget, 6th Marquess of Anglesey (1885–1947), British peer
- Charles Paget, 8th Marquess of Anglesey (born 1950), British peer

== See also ==
- Charles Paget Wade (1883–1956), British architect and poet
