= Mashburn =

Mashburn is a surname. Notable people with the surname include:

- Brian Mashburn (21st century), guitarist and vocalist in the ska band Save Ferris
- Jamal Mashburn (born 1972), American professional basketball player
- Jesse Mashburn (born 1933), American athlete
- Joe Mashburn (21st century), Dean of the Gerald D. Hines College of Architecture at the University of Houston
