= Barry Thalden =

American architect (born 1942)

- Born: July 5, 1942 (age 84); Chicago, IL, US
- Education: University of Michigan
- Occupation: Architect
- Buildings: Morongo Casino

Barry Thalden is an American architect. He is known for designing large-scale projects. He became most recognized for his firm's work on resorts, hotels, casinos and for his work with Native American tribes.

According to the May 2006 issue of Hotel Management Magazine, his firm was ranked #8 amongst the "top 70 design firms". His accomplishments have been recognized in "Who's Who in America" and "Who's Who in the World."

== Early life ==
Thalden was born on July 5, 1942, and grew up in Chicago, Illinois. His mother was a well-known Chicago artist and his father owned an electrical supply store. He attended the University of Illinois, earning degrees in both Architecture and Engineering and then attended the University of Michigan for Master Degrees in both Architecture and in Natural Resources and Planning. Subsequently, he had post-graduate business courses at Saint Louis University and Washington University in St. Louis.

== Career ==
After working for various architectural firms, he founded his own firm in 1971. Originally Saunders – Thalden Associates, it later became Thalden Boyd Emery Architects (TBE). He has been the architect for several famous projects including Buffalo Thunder Resort in Santa Fe, New Mexico, Morongo Casino Resort & Spa in Palm Springs, California, Hard Rock Casino Resort in Tulsa, Oklahoma, the National Bowling Hall of Fame and Museum in St. Louis, and renovations at Caesars Palace and the Four Seasons Resort in Las Vegas.

In addition to architecture, Thalden has also worked as an artist, and as a real estate developer of shopping centers, retirement centers and office buildings. He has authored more than 40 feature articles in professional journals and has been a speaker at numerous national conferences. He has served on the board of directors of the Arts & Education Council of Greater St. Louis and on the Board of Trustees of the Las Vegas Art Museum.

Thalden is a member of the American Institute of Architects and was elected as a Fellow in the American Society of Landscape Architects, after serving as its national vice president (1984–86).

== Personal life ==
Thalden and his wife have supported many community projects in Ashland, Oregon. He currently serves on the Board of Trustees of Southern Oregon University.

== See also ==
- List of American architects
