= Roswell Field Putnam =

American architect (1840–1911)

- Born: May 20, 1840; Leverett, Massachusetts, U.S.
- Died: April 16, 1911 (aged 70)
- Occupation: Architect
- Spouse(s): Sarah P. Scott (m. 1882; died 1884) Anna Field (m. 1895)
- Children: Karl Putnam

Roswell Field Putnam (May 20, 1840 – April 16, 1911) was the foremost residential architect in Amherst and Northampton, Massachusetts, in the last two decades of the 19th century. He designed more than 35 sizable houses in those two towns and several in nearby communities.

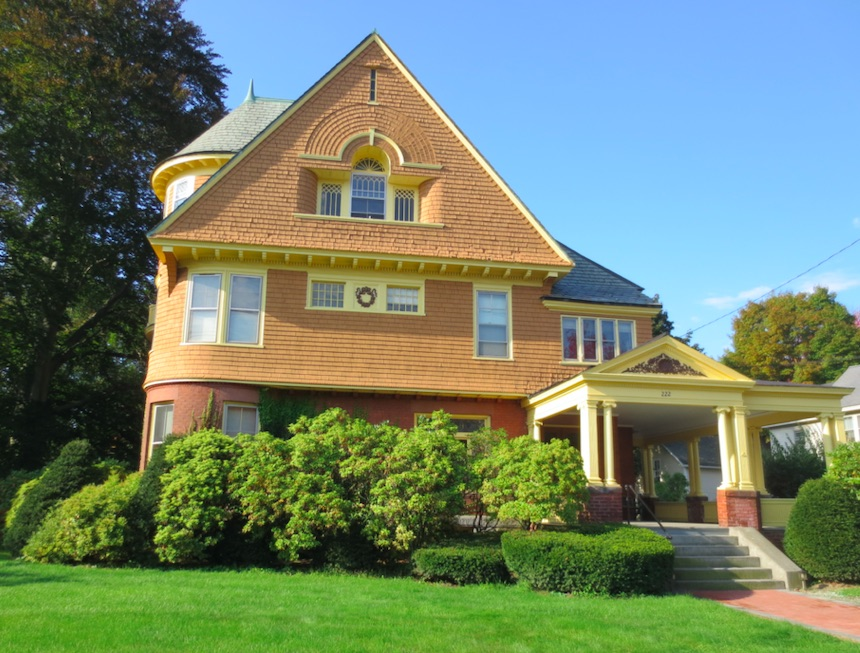
Home of John C. Hammond, 222 Elm Street, Northampton, 1891/94

His early house designs, mostly in the Queen Anne style, centered on Amherst. From 1893 to 1897, Putnam was in partnership with Lewis D. Bayley, and their firm, Putnam & Bayley, operated from an office in Northampton. The focus of the firm's residential work shifted to Northampton and tended toward the Classical Revival and Colonial Revival styles. The firm undertook several commercial buildings, notably the Masonic Block in Northampton, the most expensive building yet to have been constructed in the downtown area. The firm's work encompassed civic structures as well. Putnam or his firm also designed three public libraries in towns around the Pioneer Valley. Following the dissolution of the firm, Putnam continued his architectural practice in Northampton, though at a slower pace, until his death on April 16, 1911. He designed a number of school buildings and renovated schools in towns throughout Hampshire County, Massachusetts.

== Early years and schooling ==
Roswell Field Putnam was born in Leverett, Massachusetts, on May 20, 1840, the son of a farmer, Timothy Putnam, and his wife, Sarah Field (Bangs) Putnam. He was apparently named after Roswell Field (1767–1842), a magistrate and trial justice for Franklin County, Massachusetts, who represented the town of Leverett in the state legislature for many years. Timothy Putnam took care of Roswell Field and his wife, Sarah Graves Field, in their later years; when he died in 1842, Field bequeathed his property to Timothy and his household goods and a thousand dollars to Sarah Putnam.

In 1844, possibly on the strength of this inheritance, Timothy Putnam acquired a farm on Long Plain in Leverett, near the junction with Depot Road, together with a Greek Revival farmhouse for himself, his wife, and his four-year-old son. In 1852, he built a schoolhouse on the northwest corner of his property, which still stands at 159 Long Plain Road, although the Putnams' house at #153 was destroyed by fire. Roswell would have been twelve at the time of the schoolhouse construction, and this project may have sparked his interest in becoming an architect.

Roswell Field Putnam initially attended not this school (which met in a private home across the road before the schoolhouse was built), but rather Leverett's Center School, the "Little Red Schoolhouse" near the town center. As he grew older, he attended the Amherst Academy, a private school in Amherst, and then the Powers Institute in Bernardston, Massachusetts, which had opened in 1855. Although Putnam appears to have had no formal education beyond high school, the Daily Hampshire Gazette, 18 October 1893, p. 2, reported that "he has always been a close student and probably has the finest library outside of New York City."

== Professional training and early work ==
Roswell would have completed his studies at the Powers Institute around 1856 to 1858. He registered (as a farmer) for the Civil War draft in 1863, but there is no indication that he served; his registry entry bears the notation, "very near-sighted." Little is known of his life's course between the end of school and the early 1880s. He is identified as a farmer in the 1855 state census. No occupation is given in the 1860 U.S. Census, which shows him living with his parents in Leverett. He is still recorded living with them in the 1870 and 1880 U.S. Census; in 1870, he styled himself an architect, and in 1880, a carpenter.

Roswell's earliest architectural venture may have been a store in Leverett that he designed for Payson Field in 1867, on the west side of the tracks just north of the railroad station, which had been built on Long Plain in 1865. This store functioned until the 1890s, when it was moved to a site on the east side of Shutesbury Road, just north of Mountain Brook, for use as a residence.

=== Putnam as carpenter ===
According to his obituaries, Roswell learned the carpentry trade in Amherst and trained as an architect in Worcester, Massachusetts, under James E. Fuller. He may also have trained under an architect in Boston, although his name does not appear in Boston city directories. The sequence and timing of these ventures are not clear. He is listed (in Leverett) under "Carpenters and Builders" in the Massachusetts Register and Business Directory of 1874. Among the carpenters and builders active in Amherst in the 1870s were Chauncey Lessey and John Beston, Jr. Putnam later designed houses on behalf of both their widows, as well as one for carpenter James White, indicating possible personal connections that may relate to his training in carpentry. There was no standardized training, examination, or license required in Massachusetts to become a carpenter or architect at the time. One learned on the job, through apprenticeship—formal or informal.

=== Putnam's training as an architect ===
It was probably in the latter half of the 1870s that Putnam undertook training for the architectural profession. The customary path to becoming an architect in the U.S. in this period was to spend time as an apprentice in an architectural office, learning at the elbow of an established practitioner. Formal courses in architecture were not instituted until later in the century. The distinction between builder and architect was not always clear-cut, but from the records that survive from 1883 onward, it appears that once Putnam established himself as "architect" in Amherst, he employed others as builders, contractors, or specialized craftsmen and did not pick up a hammer himself.

According to the Daily Hampshire Gazette, Putnam learned architecture from James E. Fuller of Worcester, Massachusetts. Born in 1836, Fuller had already been a master-builder and a contractor in Athol, Massachusetts, though he was only 29 when he came to Worcester. In 1866, Fuller formed a partnership with Stephen C. Earle in Worcester, and the firm later opened an office in Boston as well. The partnership lasted 10 years. "Though it is impossible to distinguish exactly the separate contributions of Earle and Fuller to their partnership, it appears that Earle was the designer, Fuller the builder," according to Curtis Dahl, whose monograph on Earle is the most complete study of the architect. Dahl further posits that the Boston office was opened only to be able to attract inexpensive draftsmen, but that the heart of the firm's work was in Worcester. The firm's bread-and-butter work was designing stone churches in a Richardsonian Romanesque and Gothic idiom, although they did residential and commercial buildings as well.

After Fuller parted from Earle, he partnered in 1878 with Ward P. Delano to form the firm Fuller & Delano, which for more than two decades was one of the most successful firms in Worcester. The latter firm's practice seems to have been geared toward institutional buildings (schools, hospitals, libraries and firehouses), with relatively few residential commissions.

== Buildings in Amherst 1883-1893 ==
On 9 May 1882, Roswell Putnam married Sarah P. Scott, a native of Hawley, Massachusetts, a schoolteacher who had been a boarder at his parents' home, where Roswell was living. She was about 13 years his junior. A year later, the couple had a son whom they named Karl Scott Putnam. Sarah died in June 1884.

At about this time, Putnam, still residing with his parents in Leverett, established himself as a professional architect and began taking commissions in Amherst. He designed a house for B. H. Williams in 1883 (no longer extant; photo in the Jones Library Special Collections, Amherst). Two documents preserved at the Jones Library, executed in September and December 1884, are agreements with John Beston, Jr., a contractor, to build homes in Amherst according to plans drawn up by R. F. Putnam, Architect. One of these, at 24 North Prospect Street, was contracted for by the estate of Mrs. C. W. Lessey and completed in 1885; the other, at 22 Seelye Street, was contracted for by George S. Kendrick.

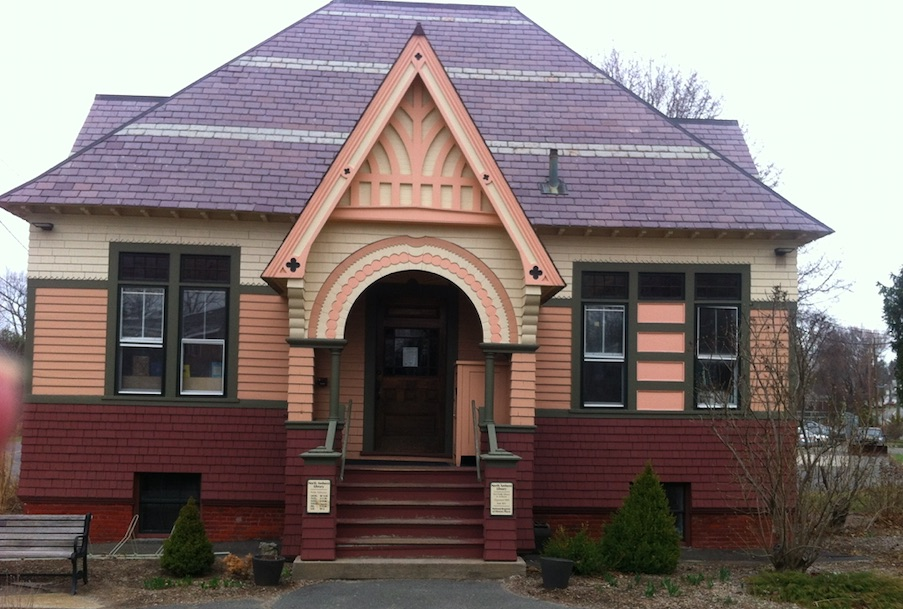
Putnam & Bayley, North Amherst Library, 1893

Putnam's practice in the 1880s and early 1890s was primarily in Amherst, designing inventive Queen Anne cross-gabled houses, many in the Shingle style, for the town's merchants and faculty members. The John C. Hammond house, at 222 Elm Street in Northampton (1891–94), is considered by many the apogee of his work in this style. Although he was the initial unanimous choice of the committee formed to recommend an architect for Amherst's Town Hall, he did not win the commission. He did, however, design the North Amherst Library, which opened in 1893.

== Putnam & Bayley, 1893-1897 ==
In 1893, Roswell Putnam formed a partnership with Lewis D. Bayley, an architect from Louisville, Kentucky. The firm Putnam & Bayley opened an office at 160 Main Street, Northampton, in the Columbian Building. "The people of this vicinity who contemplate building will not find it necessary to send away for their architectural work," the local paper crowed, "as we now have a firm of architects here that are second to none in the country as to experience and ability." The article continues, "Although having been located here but three months they have over $75,000 worth of buildings in course of erection." In 1896 the firm's offices were moved into Northampton's Lambie Block. Its houses, mostly in Northampton, became more Classical/Colonial Revival in style and symmetrical in design as the decade rolled on, but they still retained many Queen Anne features.

Roswell Putnam was married for a second time in 1895 to Mrs. Anna Field of Springfield, a 52-year-old widow from Leverett with three adult sons. Roswell's son Karl would have been twelve at the time, presumably still living at home. Roswell Putnam built a new house for the family at 19 Columbus Avenue in Northampton.

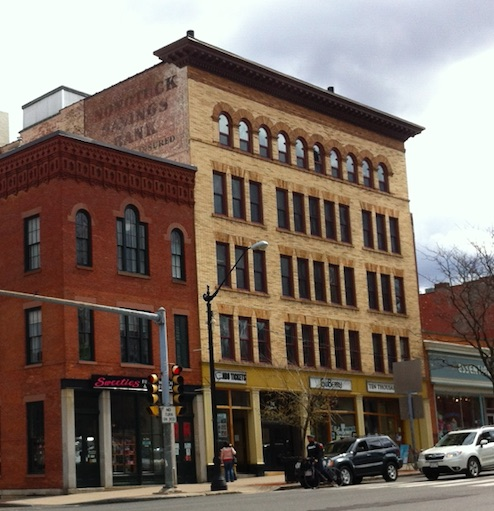
Putnam & Bayley, Lambie Block, Northampton, 1895-96

Forming a firm led to a dramatic increase in the number of jobs undertaken, as well as broadening the scope of work beyond what Putnam had done on his own. In addition to pursuing residential work, the firm undertook several commercial building projects—repairs to the McCallum Block and rebuilding of the Lambie Block in Northampton, and construction of a brick block at Maple and Cottage Streets in Easthampton, Massachusetts. They designed a new plumbing scheme for the Northampton City Hall, an addition to the Nonotuck Silk Company in Florence (a suburb of Northampton), a school in Easthampton, and the Meekins Library in Williamsburg, as well as projects in Buckland and South Deerfield, all towns in Western Massachusetts. Putnam & Bayley's most significant undertaking was the Masonic Block at 25 Main Street in Northampton, which opened in 1898.

A profile of the firm in the Daily Hampshire Gazette supplement of 30 November 1895 lists 18 clients in Northampton and vicinity for whom it had done work in the past two years, "besides about 25 residences in Springfield, Amherst, Gilbertville, Holyoke, Enfield, Hatfield, Newton, Medford, Mass., Chicago, Ill., Louisville, Ky., and Hot Springs, Ark." The non-Massachusetts projects on this list were likely undertakings begun by Bayley and completed after the firm was formed. There is no indication that Roswell Putnam ever worked outside Massachusetts, whereas Bayley had quite a peripatetic career.

== Putnam's work after the firm's dissolution (1897-1911) ==
As the Masonic Building was nearing completion, the partnership ended. A heated exchange of letters in the Daily Hampshire Gazette about which of the partners deserved credit for the Masonic Building probably reflects the conflict that caused the rift. Bayley moved on to Hartford, Connecticut, while Putnam continued to build in both Amherst and Northampton. He also designed the Shutesbury library, given to the town by M.N. Spear, and worked on new buildings and improvements for schools in Amherst, Easthampton, Leeds and Northampton.

Roswell's son, Karl Scott Putnam (1883–1965), also became an architect, earning a B.S. degree from the University of Pennsylvania in 1910 and interning in the New York office of Edward Tilton. He is listed as a draftsman in his father's office in the City Directory of Northampton in 1910. The firm was called R. Putnam & Son beginning in 1911. Karl Putnam taught architecture at Smith College from 1930 onward, and his papers are in Smith's archives. Although he and the firms to which he belonged designed many private houses, college buildings, and institutional structures in Northampton, Amherst and surrounding towns, Karl Putnam's papers reveal no buildings on which father and son collaborated. Roswell Putnam died on April 16, 1911, less than a year after his son's graduation. Karl Putnam's earliest buildings in Northampton appear to date from 1911.

Roswell's obituary states that "Mr. Putnam was of a quiet and retiring nature, but a man pleasant to meet, ever ready to converse with anyone on business connected with his profession in which he took a great pride. He was conscientious in the work he did and as a citizen was interested in whatever was for the good of the community, but never desired to hold any public office. He belonged to the various Masonic orders, which included the Northampton commandery of Knights Templar."

== Chronology of Buildings (all are in Massachusetts towns) ==
The most comprehensive compilation of photographs of Putnam's buildings is Suzannah J. Fabing, Roswell Field Putnam (1840–1911): Versatile Architect for the Pioneer Valley (Amherst, MA: Privately published, 2020), copies of which can be found at the main public library in each of the towns in which Putnam or his firm designed a building. Many of the buildings listed below are described, with photographs, in the Massachusetts Historical Commission's database, online at http://mhc-macris.net. The MHC numbers are included in parentheses in the listings below. Note that not all these records identify Putnam as the architect. Other frequently cited sources include the newspapers Amherst Bulletin, Amherst, Massachusetts; Daily Hampshire Gazette, Northampton, Massachusetts; and Springfield Republican, Springfield, Massachusetts. Springfield Republican archives, on microfilm, may be searched for a fee at The Republican - MassLive.comIts year-end surveys of new construction in the region establish date, owner, and cost but ordinarily do not identify the architect.

=== By R.F. Putnam, 1867-1892 ===
- 1867 Depot Road, Leverett Store for Payson Field (moved 1890; no longer extant)
- 1883 17 North Prospect St., Amherst Home of B.H. Williams (destroyed 1950)
- 1884/5 24 North Prospect St., Amherst House for the Lessey Estate (Mary Robison) (AMH.223)
- 1884/5 22 Seelye St., Amherst Home of George S. Kendrick
- 1885 320 North Pleasant St., Amherst Home of James White.
- c. 1885 87 North Pleasant St., Amherst Home of William Kellogg. (AMH.242).
- 1885/6 90 Spring St., Amherst "The Dell," home of Mabel and David P. Todd. (AMH.517)
- 1887 122 North Pleasant St., Amherst Home of Edward D. Bangs (AMH.239)
- 1888 105 Montague Road, Amherst House commissioned by Stephen Puffer for his son, Eugene Puffer (AMH.20)
- 1888 194 Amity St., Amherst Home of Prof. Charles Wellington (AMH.262)
- 1889 10-14 South Prospect St., Amherst Tenement commissioned by Charles Deuel (destroyed 2000)(AMH.477)
- 1889 56 Congress St., Milford Home of Edwin Thomas (MIL.2320
- 1890 38 North Prospect St., Amherst Home of Edwin D. Marsh (AMH.1078)
- 1891/4 222 Elm St., Northampton Home of John C. Hammond (NTH.480)
- 1892/4 91 Sunset Ave., Amherst "Allbreeze," home of Edward W. Carpenter (AMH.1512)
- 1892/3 30 Orchard St., Amherst Home of Herbert T. Cowles (AMH.299)

=== By Putnam & Bayley, 1893-1897 ===
- 1893 8 Montague Road, North Amherst North Amherst Library (AMH.66)
- By 1893 64 Elm St., Northampton Home of Dr. Charles W. Cooper (destroyed 1910)
- 1894 183 East Pleasant St., Amherst Home of William T. Chapin (moved from 57 N. Pleasant St., 1980) (AMH.728)
- 1894 75 New South St., Northampton Home of Dr. George D. Thayer
- 1894 36 Butler Pl., Northampton Home of Leo H. Porter (NTH.2094)
- 1894 27 Crescent, Northampton Home of Rev. Rufus Underwood (NTH.596)
- 1894 50 Phillips Pl., Northampton Home of J.W. Reid (NTH.2080)
- 1894 Round Hill, Northampton Recitation hall, Clarke Institution
- 1894 63 Dryads' Green, Northampton Home of Adeline Moffat (NTH.567).
- 1895 12 Bedford Terrace, Northampton Home of Chas. N. Fitts/Mrs. R.A. Depew (NTH.690)
- 1895 155 South St., Northampton Home of Martha A. Strong (NTH.2190)
- 1895 34 Harrison, Northampton Home of Caroline Thompson (NTH.539)
- 1895 53 Harrison, Northampton Home of Edwin B. and Mary Emerson (NTH.529)
- 1895 210 Main St., Northampton Plumbing, City Hall (NTH.790)
- 1895 Florence (296 Nonotuck St.?) Nonotuck Silk Co. addition (NTH.233)
- 1895 150 Main St., Northampton Repairs to McCallum Block (NTH.2291)
- 1895 1-5 State St., Buckland Reconstruction of Odd Fellows Hall (BUC.153)
- 1895/6 76-88 Main St., Northampton Lambie Block (NTH.2414)
- 1895/6 19 Columbus Ave., Northampton Home of Roswell F. Putnam (NTH.1047)
- 1895/7 2 Williams St., Williamsburg Meekins Library (WLM.19)
- 1895/7 7 Chapel St., Easthampton Maple Street School (EAH.347)
- 1896 23 Dryads' Green, Northampton Renovations, home of George W. Cable (NTH.576)
- 1896 12 East St., Northampton Home of John H. Maloney (NTH. 1029)
- 1896 71-77 Cottage St., Easthampton Moriarty & Griffin commercial block
- 1896/7 216 Lincoln Ave., Amherst Home of Mary Beston (AMH.174)
- 1896/9 10 Elm St., South Deerfield Grand Army Building
- 1897/8 25 Main St., Northampton Masonic Block (NTH.2059)

=== By Putnam, after the dissolution of Putnam & Bayley ===
- 1898 95 Round Hill Rd., Northampton Home of Dr. Albert and Katherine Minshall (NTH.361)
- c.1899 39 Harrison Ave., Northampton Home of Warren King (attributed) (NTH.527)
- 1900 93 Prospect St., Northampton House for Helen French Collins (NTH.598)
- 1900 Merchant's Row Amherst Addition to Jackson & Cutler store
- 1900 off Fomer Rd., Southampton Improvements, E.H. Bell house (destroyed 1931)
- 1901 South East St., South Amherst South East School-House (no longer extant)
- 1901 1001 South East St., South Amherst South Amherst Green School-House (AMH.619)
- 1902 72 High St., Southampton Home of Edward Swasey (STH.30)
- 1902 48 Parsons St., Easthampton Parsons Street Schoolhouse (EAH.633)
- 1902 10 Cooleyville Rd., Shutesbury M.N. Spear Library (SHU.9)
- 1902 84-88 Main St., Northampton Clarke Block reconstruction (destroyed)
- 1902-03 75 Harrison Ave., Northampton Home of Charles W. Spear (attributed) (NTH.530)
- 1903 32 Gray St., Amherst Second house for William T. Chapin (moved from N. Pleasant St., 2000)(AMH.193)
- 1903 45 Elm St., Northampton Addition to Burnham house
- 1904 170 South St., Northampton Home of Frank Clapp (attributed) (NTH.1046)
- 1905 Fair St., Northampton Hall for Three-County Agricultural Society (no longer extant)
- 1906 Leeds Improvements, school-houses
- 1906 Bridge St., Northampton Modifications, plumbing, Bridge-Street School
- 1907 28 Columbus Ave., Northampton Home of Myron C. Bailey (NTH.1037)
- 1907 186 Bridge Street, Northampton Home of George R. Turner (NTH.396)
- 1909/1910 Center School, Whately (WHA.33)
- 1910 Sanderson Academy, Ashfield Remodeling (destroyed 1939)
- 1910 260 Lincoln Ave., Amherst Home of Ernest M. Bolles (AMH.176)

== See also ==
- List of American architects
