= Doug Rucker =

American architect

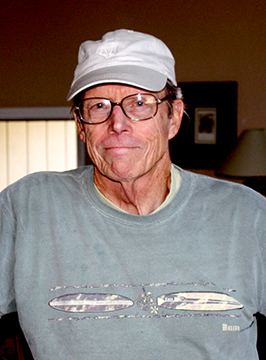
- Born: Douglas Rucker; December 31, 1927 (age 98); Elmhurst, Illinois, U.S.
- Education: University of Illinois at Urbana-Champaign
- Occupation: Architect
- Awards: Cultural-Historical Landmark (Hogan Residence)
- Buildings: Pedestal House, Hogan Residence, Water Tower

Douglas Rucker (born December 31, 1927), is an American mid-century style architect and writer.

He has designed more than 80 residential and commercial projects and over 50 remodels/additions in California, Hawaii and Greece.

== Early life ==
Rucker was born in Elmhurst, Illinois, to Phil and Eva Rucker, a metalworker and housewife, respectively, and attended grammar school in Chicago. He majored in architectural drawing at Austin High School in Chicago.

== Education and early career ==
Rucker was awarded a scholarship to, and briefly attended, the Art Institute of Chicago. Rucker received his Bachelor of Science (B.S.) in Architecture from the University of Illinois at Urbana-Champaign in 1950; he then worked as a draftsman in Denver and San Diego before moving to Altadena and becoming a licensed architect.

Rucker worked for various firms in the greater Los Angeles region, including architect Ray Jones of Glendale, California, and architecture firm Gilman & Young of the Brentwood neighborhood of Los Angeles.

In 1957, Rucker opened his own firm in Pacific Palisades, as part of a partnership and in 1958, he opened his own, eponymous firm in Malibu. During the firm's tenure, Rucker primarily designed single-family, post-and-beam residences in Malibu; some projects were also located in Calabasas, Santa Monica, and Los Angeles. Though now retired from architecture, Rucker lives in California's Santa Monica Mountains.

== "Pedestal House" ==
In 1966, he built his second house, the "Pedestal House", on a Malibu promontory with the main floor sitting atop a forty-foot pedestal. Overlooking the mouth of Malibu Canyon and Surfrider Beach the home featured views of the Pacific Ocean, Palos Verdes Peninsula, the Serra Retreat, the Malibu Movie Colony and Catalina Island. An architectural success, the house was featured in the Los Angeles Times, and was later included in the American Institute of Architects's Malibu Home Tour. On September 25, 1970, the house was destroyed by a brush fire, but two years later, Rucker constructed a new, fire-resistive home on the same foundation as the Pedestal House. This second house was also featured in the Los Angeles Times, and again made part of the AIA Home Tour. The house is listed in Gebhard & Winter's Guide to Architecture in Los Angeles and Southern California, alongside works by Frank Lloyd Wright, Frank Gehry, and other major architects.

Rucker discusses the building and rebuilding of both structures in his book, "Trial by Fire: A Tale of Two Houses."

== Cultural-historical landmark ==
On October 19, 2017, a 1964 home designed by Rucker, known as The Hogan Residence, located at 8527 Brier Drive, Los Angeles, CA, 90046, was designated a Cultural-Historical Landmark (HCM 1152) by the City of Los Angeles Cultural Heritage Commission. The home was published on Curbed in 2019.

== Other notable projects ==
=== Malibu, California ===
- Water Tower House
- Jack Warden residence in the Malibu Movie Colony (actor)
- Kris Kristofferson residence (actor, singer)
- Mike Bright residence (Olympic athlete)
- Munro House
- Muller House
- Knebel House
- Craft House
- 161 Paradise Cove Road

== Published books ==
- Trial By Fire: A Tale of Two Houses
- Building a Home That Loves You

== See also ==
- List of American architects
