= Brian Healy (architect) =

American architect

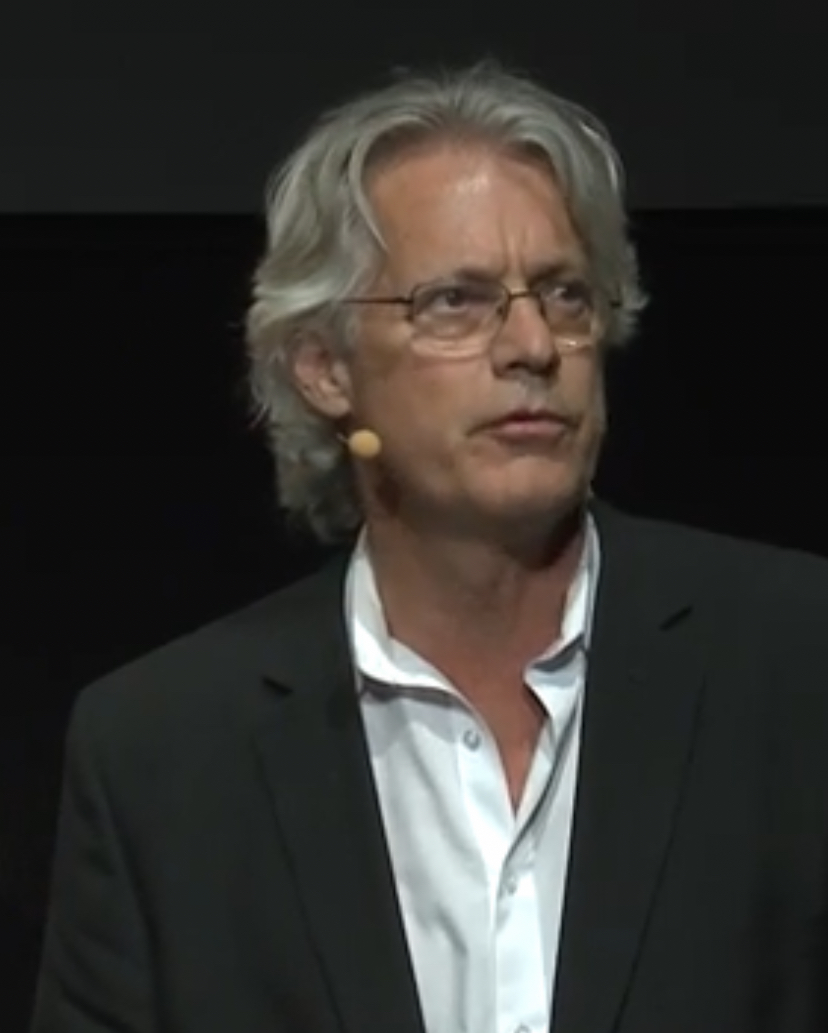
- Born: July 18, 1956 (age 70); Gary, Indiana
- Education: Pennsylvania State University, Yale University
- Occupation: Architect
- Website: https://brianhealyarchitects.com/

Brian Healy is an American architect, educator, and painter. He maintains studios in Somerville, Massachusetts, and Jackson, New Hampshire. He established Brian Healy Architects, an architecture and design firm, in Boston, Massachusetts in 1985. Healy is a fellow of the American Institute of Architects and has taught architectural design at undergraduate and graduate levels across North America. He currently holds the position of Marlborough Distinguished Visiting Scholar-in-Residence at the School of Architecture & Community Design at the University of South Florida.

== Early life and education ==
Brian Healy was raised in Bucks Country, Pennsylvania. He earned a Bachelor of Science in architecture from the Pennsylvania State University in 1978 and a Master of Architecture from Yale School of Architecture in 1981, where he studied under James Stirling, John Hejduk, Vincent Scully, and George Kubler and edited Perspecta 19: The Yale Architecture Journal. After graduation, he received fellowships from Yale University (William Wirt Winchester Traveling Fellowship) and the Van Allen Institute (Dinkeloo Traveling Fellowship) that supported a year of travel with a residency at the American Academy in Rome in 1983. The travels included Ireland, Italy, Greece, Sudan, Egypt, India, Nepal, and Thailand. At 26, he designed and built a home and nursery in the Florida Everglades, which was featured in LIFE Magazine and won Architect Magazine's Progressive Architecture (P/A) Award in 1984.

== Career ==
Brian moved from New York City to Boston in 1985 after receiving a residential commission on Cape Cod. Before establishing his own practice in Boston, he worked as a designer in the offices of Charles Moore, César Pelli, and Richard Meier. Healy served as president of the Boston Society of Architects in 2004 and was on its Board of Directors from 2000 to 2005. From 2011 to 2014, he was design director at Perkins&Will. He was elected to the College of Fellows of the American Institute of Architects in 2013.

Brian has designed residential and institutional projects in several states, including Florida, Massachusetts, Rhode Island, New Hampshire, Pennsylvania, New York, New Jersey, Illinois, and California. Notable buildings includes the Lincoln Street Garage in Boston; Beach House (with Mike Ryan) in Loveladies, New Jersey; Boston Film Company in Cambridge; the Grant Recital Hall at Brown University in Providence; the Children's Chapel and Education Center at the Korean Church of Boston in Brookline; the Student Centre at the University of Massachusetts Lowell; Additions to the McGuirk Alumni Stadium at University of Massachusetts Amherst; and the Essex Boathouse in Essex, Massachusetts.

In 2010, architect and Boston Globe critic Robert Campbell described that Children's Chapel at the Korean Church of Boston as "one of Boston's best architectural spaces." Brian Healy Architects won several national competitions, including Chicago's Initiatives for Mixed Income Housing (2001); the Civic Center at Lake Elsinore, California (2005); and the Mill Center for the Arts in Hendersonville, North Carolina (2007). The firm was a finalist in several other national competitions, including the Visitors’ Center for the Darwin D. Martin House in Buffalo, New York (2001); Community Housing and Design in Long Beach, California (2002); and Intergenerational Housing in Chicago, Illinois (2003). They also won the local competition for the Children's Chapel in Brookline, Massachusetts (2004).

Brian's work has received seven Progressive Architecture (P/A) design awards, including one for "Floatyard", a proposed apartment complex in Boston Harbor addressing rising sea levels for which Brian gave a TEDTalk in 2013 discussing the architect's role in climate change. Other PA design awards included Korean Church of Boston (2009), Housing Prototype for Atlantic City (1997), and Chicago's Initiative for Mixed Income Housing (2002).

== Monographs ==
Two monographs of Brian's work, "Commonplaces" (2008) and "Commonplaces: Working on an American Architecture" (2021), were published by Oscar Riera Ojeda Publishers. In a review of the 2021 monograph in the Fall 2022 issue of Yale's Constructs, Thomas Fisher noted that the book "serves as a reminder of the consistency and quality of Healy's designs over the last four decades, making him one of the most talented - and yet unsung - architects practicing in America today."

== Academia ==
Since 1988, Healy has taught architectural design studios and seminars at undergraduate and graduate levels at various colleges and universities across North America. From 2001 to 2005, Healy was a faculty member at Yale School of Architecture, where he helped coordinate the Building Project, a first-year design-build studio and summer program.

Healy has also held faculty design positions at Harvard's Graduate School of Design (2004, 2012), the Massachusetts Institute of Technology (2001-2003), the University of Pennsylvania (1997-2000), the University of Michigan (1997), the University of Florida (1996), the University of Virginia (1992), and the Pennsylvania State University (1991-1992). He has also held positions as Visiting Distinguished Professor in Architecture at the City College of New York (2010, 2011-2014) and Roger Williams University (2007-2008, 2013). He was Cameron Visiting Architect at Middlebury College (2009), the Hideo Sasaki Distinguished Visiting Critic at the Boston Architectural College (2009), the Visiting Artist in Residence at Amherst College (2007), the John G. Williams Visiting Professor at the University of Arkansas (2006), and the Ruth and Norman Moore Visiting Professor at Washington University in St. Louis (2005, 2010). He was a Fellow at the MacDowell Art Colony in 1994.

== Awards and recognition ==
• Healy's design work received seven Progressive Architecture (P/A) awards, presented by Architect Magazine to honor design excellence in advanced programming and innovation in unbuilt or upcoming architectural projects.

• His work was acknowledged as a National Endowment for the Arts (NEA) Design Winner through a national competitive design process for the Mill Center for the Arts in Hendersonville, North Carolina.

• Brian's work has received more than 50 distinct local Design Excellence, Honor, and Merit awards from the Boston Society of Architects (BSA) and other regional chapters of the American Institute of Architects (AIA).

== See also ==
- List of American architects
