= Devendra Contractor =

Indian-American architect

- Education: St. John's College (Santa Fe); University of New Mexico School of Architecture and Planning
- Occupation: Architect
- Relatives: Didi Contractor (mother); Kirin Narayan (sister)
- Practice: DNCA
- Buildings: Vladem Contemporary, Santa Fe, New Mexico; Tamarind Institute at UNM, Albuquerque, New Mexico
- Website: dncarchitect.com

Devendra Narayan Contractor is an American architect known for his work in New Mexico on education, fine arts and performing arts facilities. He is the founder and principal architect at DNCA, located in Santa Fe, New Mexico. Contractor is notable for his work in historic preservation, challenging revival style conventions while referencing materials and methods of traditional New Mexico architecture.

== Early life and education ==
Contractor is the son of Didi Contractor, a German-American artist and builder. He was born and spent his childhood in India, but moved to the United States to enroll at St. John's College in Santa Fe, New Mexico after high school. Contractor studied and taught architecture at the University of New Mexico in Albuquerque, New Mexico.

== Career ==
Prior to completing his formal education in architecture, Contractor worked for 15 years as a builder, site superintendent, and mason. He specializes in the design of contemporary buildings, with simple designs that accent the materials of construction. Contractor's firm, DNCA, is located in the Baca Railyard district in Santa Fe, New Mexico.

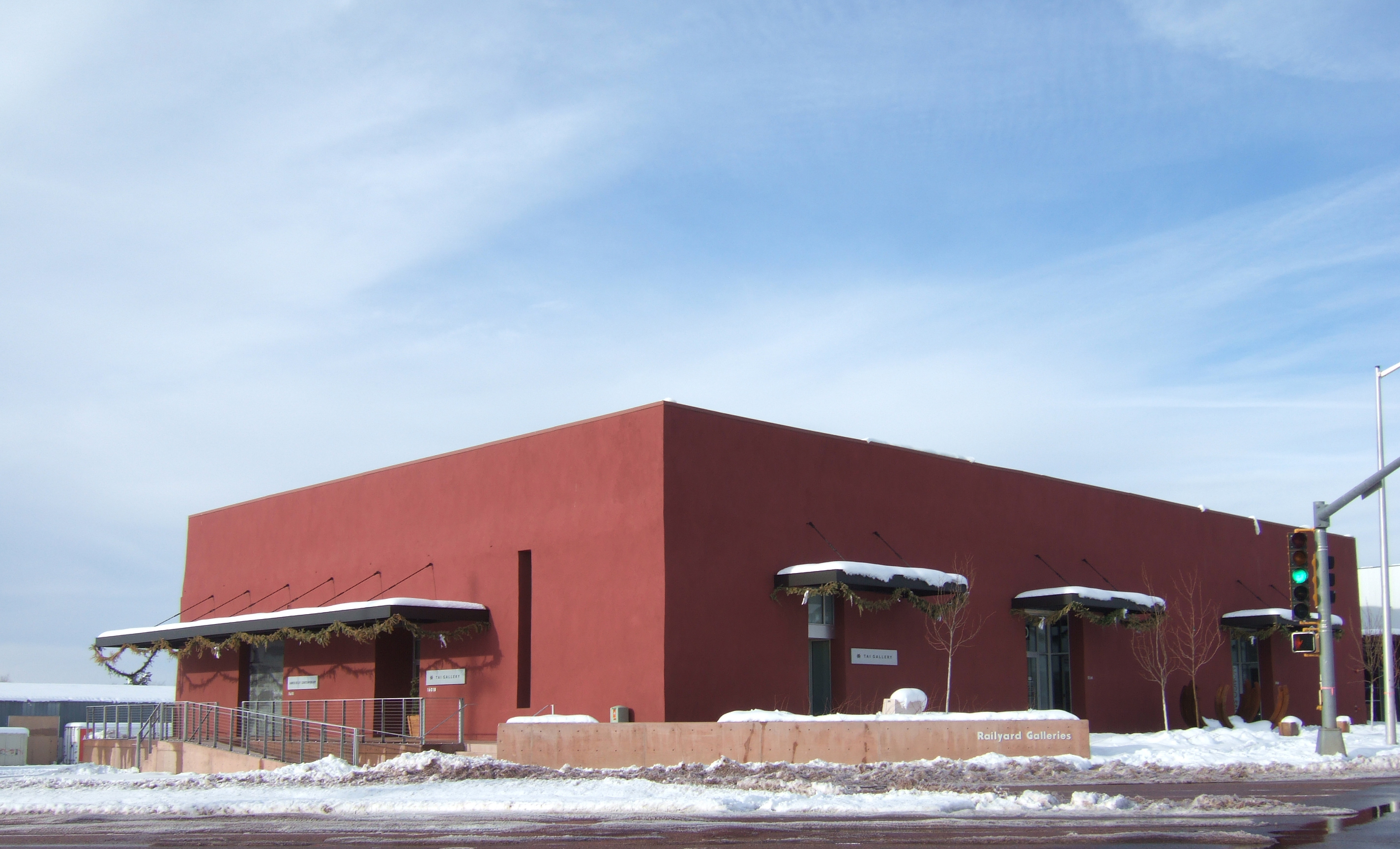
Santa Fe Railyard Galleries

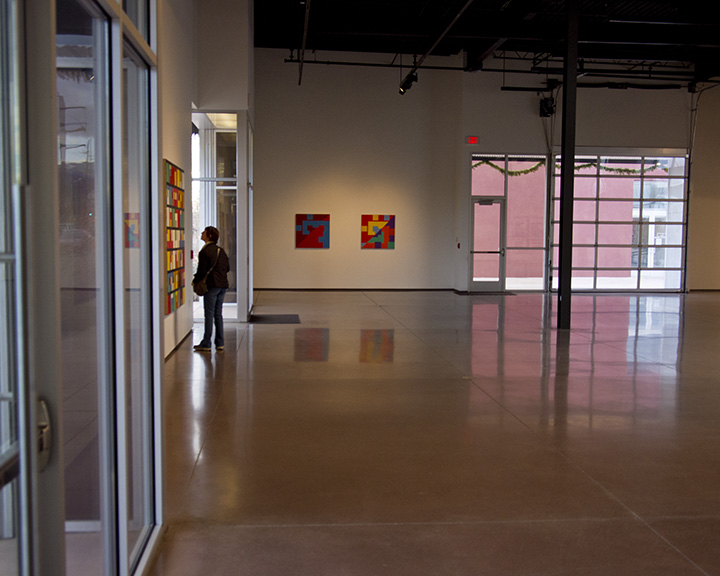
Exhibit at the Railyard Galleries.

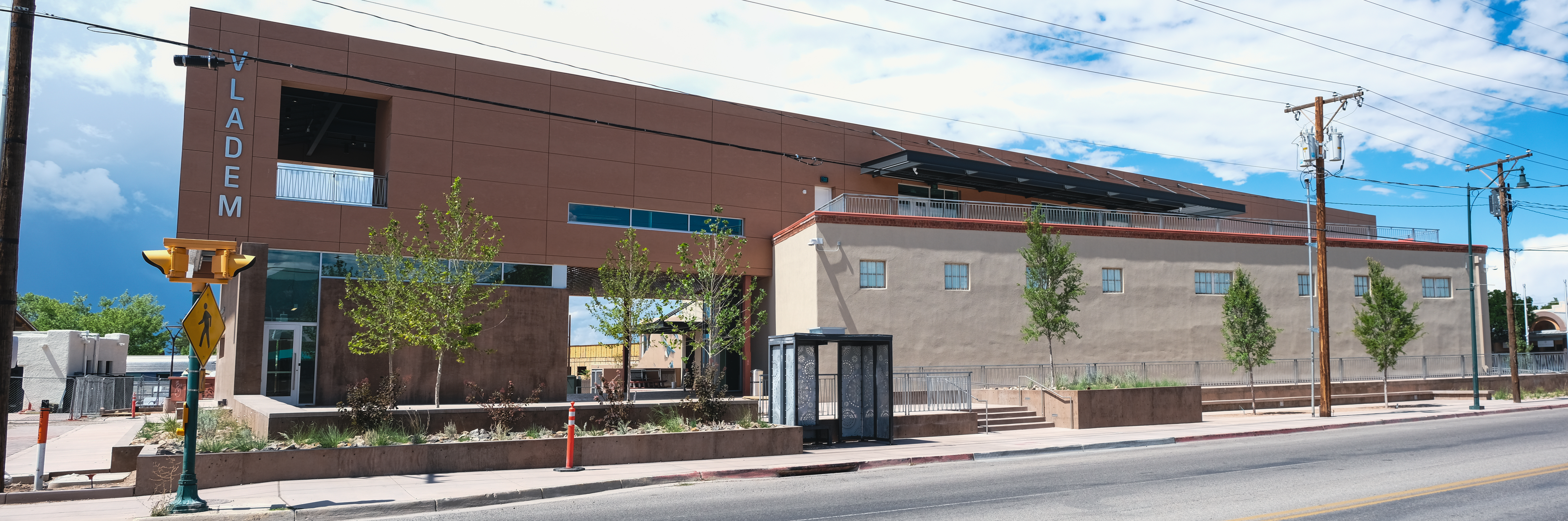
The Vladem Contemporary in Santa Fe

=== Notable projects ===
Contractor has completed a variety of award-winning architecture and planning projects across New Mexico. In particular, Contractor specializes in adaptive reuse projects with an emphasis on historic preservation. He designed the Railyard Galleries complex, including the Rose-Morelli Building, the Sears-Hansen Building, the Truro Building, the David Richard Gallery, the Gebert Contemporary, and the William Siegal Gallery (projects completed between 2007 and 2012). In 2008, the project received an award for historic preservation, namely the State of New Mexico Heritage Preservation Award for Urban Design within an Historic Context.

According to Paul Weideman, a leading architectural critic in Santa Fe, the gallery complex references the historical materials of the 1800s Santa Fe Railyard district (notably stucco, brick, and profiled metal) while also creating a consistent and unique contemporary style. The complex of galleries challenges traditional Pueblo Revival style conventions to shape a modern and unique vernacular for the Santa Fe Railyard Arts District.

Contractor's other notable adaptive reuse works include the following:

- The Tamarind Institute at UNM, completed in 2010, renovated the UNM Architecture Annex to house a lithography education facility and gallery.
- The Levitated Toy Factory, completed in 2014, is an adaptive reuse building in downtown Albuquerque. The project converted the former Albuquerque Journal building into a high-tech fabrication shop.

Contractor is the lead architect for the New Mexico Museum of Art's Vladem Contemporary, an annex dedicated to contemporary art and art education located in the Santa Fe Railyard. The new facility is an adaptive reuse project at the former Halpin Building (a 1930s brick and steel warehouse). It is set to open in September 2023.

Contractor's firm is currently designing the new campus for the Georgia O'Keeffe Museum in downtown Santa Fe.

== See also ==
- List of American architects
