= Claude Stroller =

American architect (1921–2023)

Claude Stoller (December 2, 1921 – May 16, 2023) was an American architect, educator, and Fellow of the American Institute of Architects (FAIA). He was known as a pioneers in affordable housing in California, his long academic career at the University of California, Berkeley, and his architectural partnerships including Marquis & Stoller and Stoller/Partners.

== See also ==
- List of American architects
