= Tom Morbitzer =

American architect and designer (born 1974)

Thomas Morbitzer
- Born: 1974 (age 51–52); Columbus, Ohio, US
- Education: Ohio State University (B.S.); Yale University (M. Arch.)

Thomas Morbitzer (born 1974) is an American architect and designer based in New York City. He is the co-founder of AMMOR Architecture. He is a founding board member of the Williamsburg Biannual, an artist space in Brooklyn, New York and serves as its Secretary and Treasurer.

== Personal life ==
Morbitzer graduated from Ohio State University School of Architecture (now Knowlton School) and Yale University School of Architecture. He received a certificate of architecture from the Fontainebleau Schools and was awarded the Stewardson Keefe Lebrun Grant from the American Institute of Architects New York Chapter to travel and study throughout Greece. His partner is Goil Amornvivat. They reside in Williamsburg, Brooklyn.

== Career ==
=== Architecture and interior design ===
Morbitzer began his architectural career as an intern at the Columbus Neighborhood Design Assistance Center. He was invited by then-Dean Robert A. M. Stern to work in his New York City office as a designer and project manager on culturally significant structures such as the Guild Hall of East Hampton, NY, and the East Hampton Library, both originally designed by Aymar Embury II. He also contributed to new buildings like the International Quilt Museum in Lincoln, Nebraska, and the Calabasas Civic Center in California.

In 2006, Morbitzer co-founded TUG Studio with Goil Amornvivat, and in 2007, they rebranded their firm to AMMOR Architecture. AMMOR Architecture focuses on architecture and interior design. The firm specializes in NYC commercial and residential buildings, with expertise in landmarked buildings, such as 88 Central Park West and 34 Gramercy Park. Outside of New York City, they have focused on new custom residential construction and additions. Their projects have also garnered acclaim in non-traditional spheres, including set design for television show Head Games (2009) and museum exhibition design such as the Making a Home exhibition for Japan Society's 100th anniversary.

==== James Logan Abernathy House ====
The James Logan Abernathy House was designed by William F Cody in 1962 in Palm Springs, California. In 2006, with architect Michael Haverland and designer Darren Brown, Morbitzer restored the residence's original decor and upgraded its windows and interior details. AMMOR Architecture was hired to design a spa, carport, and new pool house addition (2012) as well as the kitchen (2024) that complemented the original landmark design. The house was a designated Class 1 historic site by the Palm Springs Preservation Board in 2013. Since completion, the residence has been featured in several fashion editorial features and advertising campaigns for companies such as Louis Vuitton, Herman Miller, Disney, and Mercedes-Benz.

=== Teaching ===
Morbitzer was the Studio Coordinator at Parsons School of Design AAS Interior Design program from 2004 to 2009. From 2010 to 2014, Morbitzer served as part-time faculty at the New York School of Interior Design. He has lectured on residential design for the American Institute of Architecture. He continues to be a guest critic and volunteer mentor for the students from Ohio State and Yale.

== Awards and exhibitions ==
- 2024: AIA NY Interiors Residential Review Winner - Gramercy Triplex
- 2024: NYC x Design Honoree - Central Park South Apartment
- 2024: NYC x Design Honoree - Art Townhouse
- 2022: NYC x Design Honoree - Gramercy Triplex
- 2018: NYC x Design Honoree - Downtown Abbey
- 2019: Preservation Award Village Preservation Society of East Hampton
- 2010-2013: DIFFA (Design Industry Foundation Fighting AIDS) designer's table
- 2004: Entry of Note, National AIDS Memorial Competition, "Circle of Lights"
- 2004: The Voting Booth Project, "Hindsight 20/20" (with Robert A.M. Stern)
- 2004: Recipient, Americans for the Arts Public Art Network's Best Public Art Projects
- 2003: Honorable Mention, Jan Ken Pon: Hand to Mouth 2nd Gifu World Design Competition
- 2003: Exhibition at Carnegie Museum of Arts: Heinz Architectural Center
- 2003: AIANY Travelling Fellowship Award, "American Idol: Landscape, Architecture, and Democracy in Greece"
- 2000: Recipient, Yale Eero Saarinen Award for Design Excellence
- 1999: Recipient, Yale James Gamble Rogers Memorial Scholarship
- 1996: Recipient, Ohio State Szabo Award

== See also ==
- List of American architects
