= Arthur Cogswell =

American architect

Arthur Ralph Cogswell Jr. (October 29, 1930, in Jacksonville, Florida – September 29, 2010) was an American architect known for his work in the Modernist school, primarily designing homes in North Carolina.

== Education ==
He graduated in drama in 1952 from the University of North Carolina at Chapel Hill and received an architectural degree from the Design School at North Carolina State University in 1959. He served in the Air Force during the Korean War.

== Career ==
Following his graduation, Cogswell worked for Don Stewart at CPAA. He opened his own firm in 1962. In 1967 he and his partner Werner Hausler formed the firm Cogswell Hausler Associates.

In 1972, Cogswell was named an FAIA; at the time he was the youngest architect (age 42) to receive that honor. He left a legacy of mid-century houses that are still prized today. In 2012 he was posthumously awarded the AIA NC Kamphoefner Prize.

== Projects ==
Cogswell designed a few commercial projects, including the Duke Faculty Club, since destroyed. Most of his projects were residential homes in the Modernist style, designed during the period 1960–1977. In his last years, he was occupied with an innovative process to relieve famine in Libya using Modernist architectural processes.

== Personal ==
Cogswell was married and had two daughters. He died September 29, 2010, from an accidental head injury sustained while walking his dog.

== See also ==
- List of American architects
