= Sinclair Black =

American architect

Sinclair Black is an American urban designer, planner, architect, educator, and author.

He is currently the Roberta P. Crenshaw Centennial Professor Emeritus in Urban Design and Environmental Planning. He was awarded the Athena Medal by the Congress for the New Urbanism in 2008.

== Biography ==
Black was born in San Antonio, Texas, and earned his Bachelor of Architecture degree from The University of Texas at Austin in 1962. He went on to receive a Master of Architecture degree from The University of California, Berkeley, in 1970. Black founded the architectural firm Black + Vernooy (now Black + Motal) in Austin, where he became involved in the design and planning of numerous projects in Austin, Texas.

His projects include the 2nd Street District, Cedar Street Courtyard, and the Great Streets Master Plan for downtown Austin. He also worked on Reconnect Austin, a grassroots campaign advocating for the burial of Interstate 35 through downtown Austin to transform the area into a walkable, mixed-use space.

Black joined the faculty of the University of Texas at Austin School of Architecture in 1967. He served as acting dean from 1972 to 1973 and was a professor at the school for more than 50 years.

== See also ==
- List of American architects
