= Patricia Saldaña Natke =

American architect

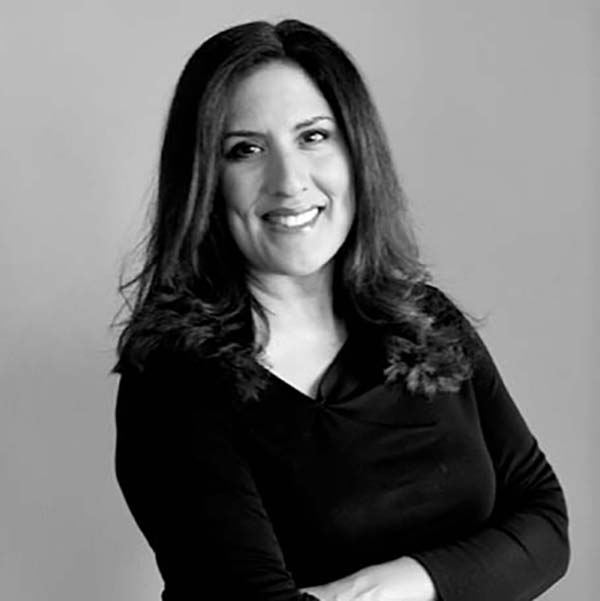
- Born: 1964 (age 61–62); Chicago, Illinois, U.S
- Education: University of Illinois at Urbana-Champaign (B.Arch., 1986)
- Occupation: Architect
- Practice: UrbanWorks, Ltd.
- Buildings: La Casa Student Housing, Galewood Elementary Charter School, Gary Green Link masterplan.

Patricia Saldaña Natke (born 1964 in Chicago, Illinois) is an American architect, the founding partner and president of UrbanWorks, Ltd., a Chicago-based architecture, interiors, and urban planning firm.

== Biography ==
Saldaña Natke is a founding partner of UrbanWorks, an architecture, planning, and interior design firm in Chicago. She has completed over 5,000 units of housing, six mixed-income developments, office and university projects, and over 65 public school renovations, additions, and new construction.

Prior to founding UrbanWorks, Saldaña Natke worked in design positions for several Chicago architectural firms. She chaired the National AIA Diversity Committee for the American Institute of Architects and was a past president of Chicago Women in Architecture and the Illinois São Paulo, Brazil Partners of the Americas Chapter. She is currently on the board of the American Institute of Architects Chicago Chapter and is a member of the Economic Club of Chicago, Arquitectos – the Society of Hispanic Architects, HACIA (Hispanic American Construction Industry Association), and the Concordia Place Advisory Council.

A graduate of the University of Illinois at Urbana Champaign, Saldaña Natke has served as adjunct professor at the University of Illinois at Chicago, a facilitator at Archeworks, and a part-time Professor at the Illinois Institute of Technology’s School of Architecture, and a lecturer at the School of the Art Institute of Chicago.

Saldaña Natke was listed in the “2014: 50 Chicago Designers” by Newcity, one of the five "Chicago's Emerging Grand Designers" by Crain’s Chicago Business, and was elevated to Fellow of the American Institute of Architects in 2018.

== Awards and honors ==
- Fellow of the American Institute of Architects, 2018
- AIA Chicago Distinguished Building Award, Citation of Merit, A Safe Haven: Affordable Veterans Housing, 2017
- ALA Merit Award, ICE CADE: Center for Architecture, Design + Education, 2017
- AIA Illinois Mies Van Der Rohe Award, Associate Architect, Cermak Green Line Station, 2016
- American Architecture Award, Galewood Elementary School, 2016
- AIA Chicago Distinguished Building Award, Associate Architect, Cermak Green Line Station, 2015
- IES Illumination Award of Merit, Galewood Elementary School (with Primera Engineers, Lighting), 2015
- ALA Gold Medal Design Award, Galewood Elementary School, 2013
- Chicago Building Congress Merit Award for Construction Under $15 Million, La Casa Student Housing, 2013
- Richard H. Driehaus Foundation Award for Architectural Excellence in Community Design, First Place, La Casa Student Housing, 2013
- ALA Merit Award, La Casa Student Housing, 2012
- AIA Chicago Small Project Honor Award, Automobile Container, 2011
- AIA Chicago Distinguished Building Award, Citation of Merit, Veterans Memorial Campus at Archer Heights, 2011
- AIA Chicago Regional & Urban Design Award, Citation of Merit, Big. Bold. Visionary. Groundplanes for Gary, 2011
- ALA Merit Award, Park Boulevard Mixed-Income Housing, 2011
- ALA Merit Award, Veterans Memorial Campus at Archer Heights, 2011
- Chicago Architecture Foundation, Patron of the Year Nomination, Buckingham Fountain Phase II, 2011
- Design Evanston Planning Award, Evanston Lakefront Masterplan, 2010
- Design Evanston Residential Award, Automobile Container, 2010
- Richard H. Driehaus Foundation Award for Architectural Excellence in Community Design, First Place, Veterans Memorial Campus at Archer Heights, 2010
- AIA Chicago Urban Design Award for Excellence in Architecture, Honor Award, Chicago 2016 Olympic Master Plan, 2009
- Mayor Daley’s Landscape Award, First Place, Veterans Memorial Campus at Archer Heights, 2009

== See Also ==
- List of American architects
