= Marc Thorpe (architect) =

American designer

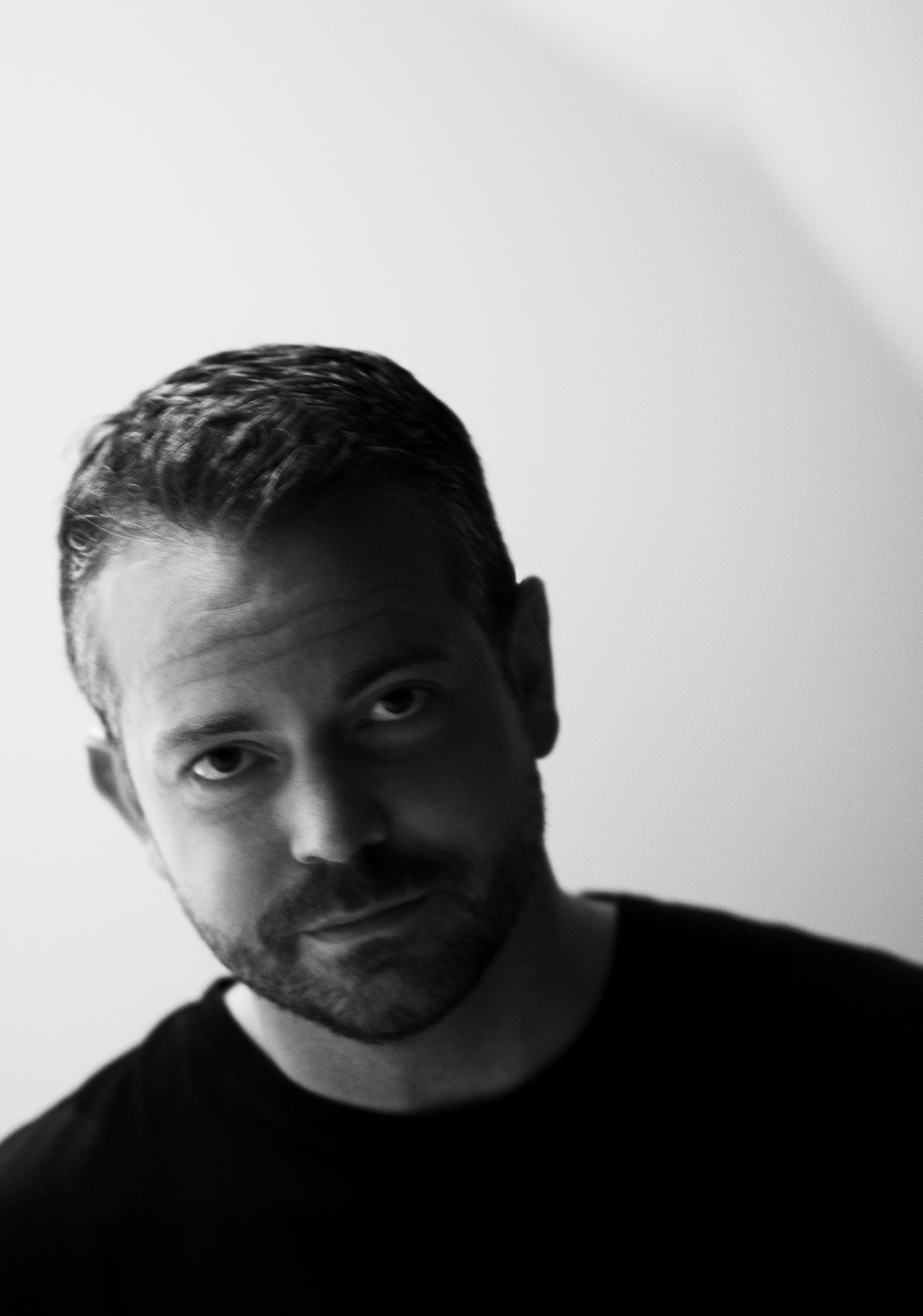
Marc Thorpe
- Born: 1978 (age 47–48); Maryland
- Education: University of Maryland; Parsons School of Design
- Occupation: Designer
- Years active: 2010–present
- Website: marcthorpedesign.com

Marc Thorpe (born 1978) is an American industrial designer. He is the recipient of the Alpha Rho Chi Medal for architectural leadership at Parsons. He also received the American Architecture Award in 2022.

== Early life and education ==
Thorpe was born in 1978 in Maryland. He received a B.A. in industrial design from the University of Maryland in 2000 and a master's degree in architecture from Parsons School of Design, New York, in 2004.

== Career ==
In 2010, Thorpe founded Marc Thorpe Design in New York City, a firm that focuses on architecture and industrial design.

In 2014, Thorpe received the Good Design Award in Environment Design. A year later, he exhibited, Blurred Limits, for Moroso in New York City.

In 2019, Thorpe and Claire Pijoulat built the off-grid Edifice Cabin in the Western Catskills of New York State. The project led to the establishment of Edifice Upstate in 2021, which designs and builds homes using off-the-grid solar technology. In the same year, Thorpe collaborated with Italian glass maker, VENINI, presenting his first solo collection.

In 2020, Thorpe designed the Dakar Houses for the artisans involved in the Moroso M'Afrique furniture collection.

In 2022, Monsa Publications published book, Toward an Architecture of Responsibility.
