= Rene Rivierre =

American architect (1898–1953)

- Born: September 11, 1898
- Died: April 28, 1953 (aged 54)
- Occupation: Architect

Rene Rivierre (1898–1953) was an American architect. He designed Spanish Revival buildings and houses in California, especially in Beverly Hills, California.

== Career ==
Rivierre designed a house at 705 North Arden Drive in Beverly Hills in 1927. He also designed houses at 703 and 707 Walden Drive. Number 707, built in 1930, was the home of actor Joe E. Brown. In August 2014, it was added to the City of Beverly Hills Historical Landmarks.

Rivierre designed a house at 1716 Chevy Chase Drive in the Spanish Revival architectural style in 1929. That same year, he remodelled the house located at 905 North Camden Drive.

== See also ==
- List of American architects
