= Blank Studio Architecture =

Architectural practice

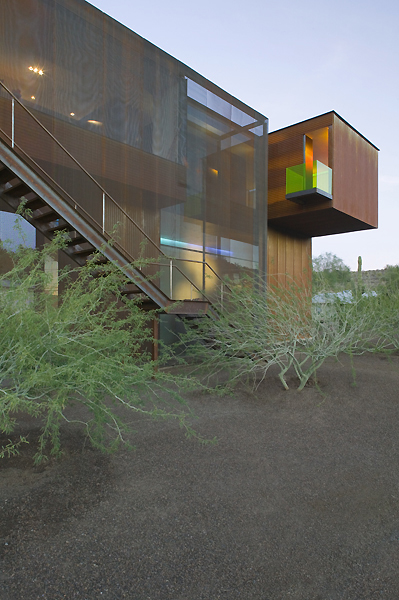
Xeros Residence / Bill Timmerman Photography

Blank Studio Architecture is an architectural practice based in Phoenix, Arizona. The practice was founded in 2006 by Matthew Trzebiatowski, AIA. The work of Blank Studio Architecture has been compared to the likes of Le Corbusier and Mies van der Rohe because of their use of material and volume. Their works focus on the sensual qualities found in architecture, such as interplay of natural and artificial illumination, and unconventional uses of material. Projects consistently display a phenomenological approach to design.

The studio partnered with the University of Arizona and The School of Architecture to give students the opportunity to learn about architecture through practice. Students worked on the studio's active projects and gained exposure to all phases of the work.

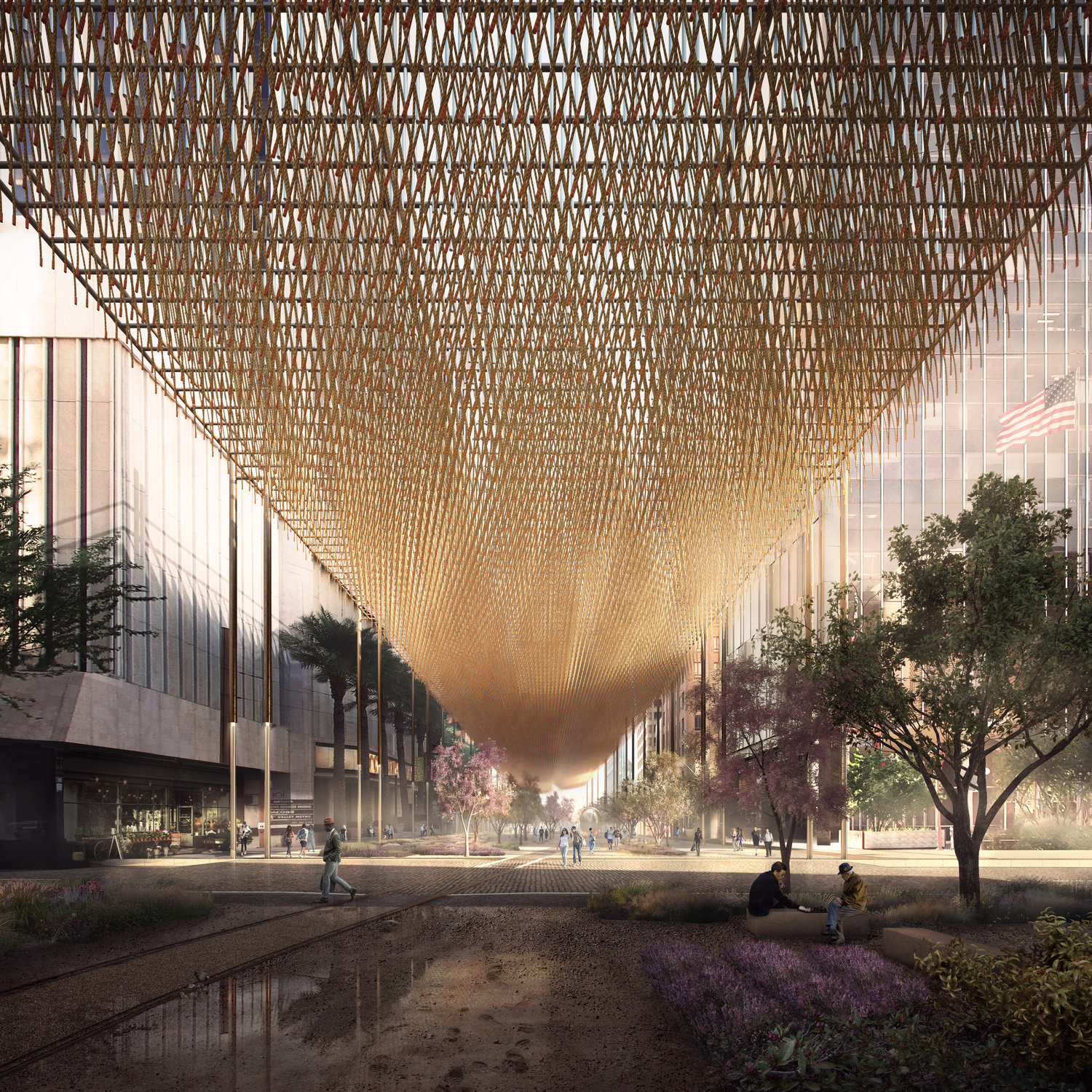
Jacaranda Avenue AIA Winner / Forbes Massie

== Works ==
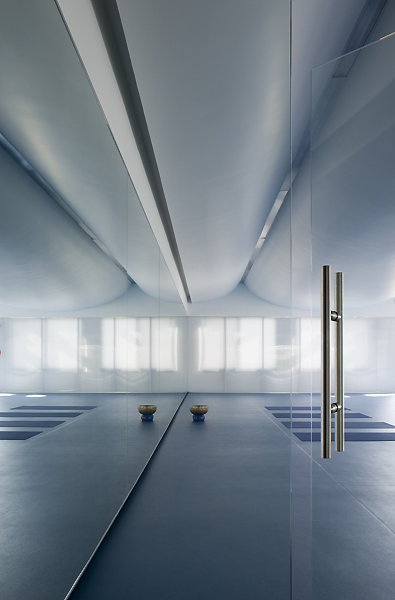
Yoga Deva / Bill Timmerman Photography

The firm's most recognizable project is the Xeros Residence, 2006. It has had a strong presence in the architectural press. Most notably Dwell, Detail, GA, Corrugated Iron: Building on the Frontier and Phoenix 21st Century. In 2013 it was showcased on HGTV's Extreme Homes. The residence was awarded the distinction of Record House (2006) by Architectural Record, has been awarded honors from the American Institute of Architects (2006), and Project of the Year by Residential Architect Magazine (2008).

== Selected other works ==
- The Blu House on Stanford Ave (Completed 2026)
- Blue Clay Country Spa (Shortlist Finalist, 2017)
- Jacaranda Avenue (Competition, First Place, 2016)
- House of Writing (Invited Competition, 2013)
- "T" House (Construction Documents, 2013)
- Tongzhou Wenyu River Project (Invited Competition, 2012)
- Yoga Deva, 2009,
- Superior Social Condenser, 2008

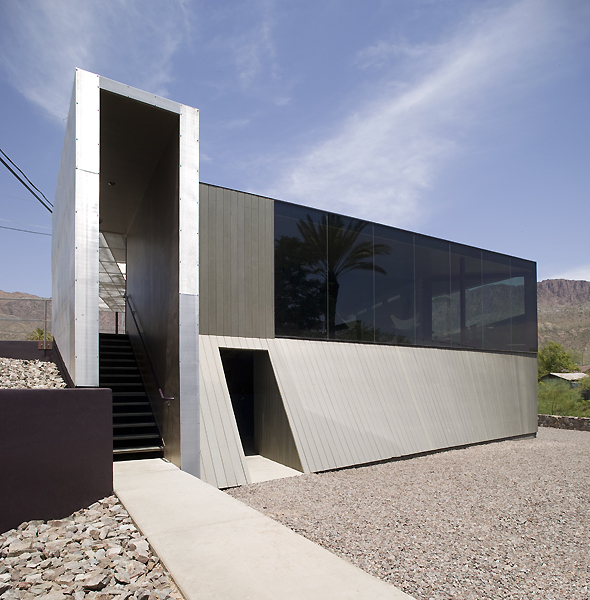
Social Condenser / Bill Timmerman Photography
