= Elizabeth Lowrey =

Elizabeth Lowrey is an American interior designer, and principal and director of interior architecture at Elkus Manfredi Architects.

== Career ==
Lowrey gained a Bachelor of Interior Architecture degree in 1983 from Auburn University. She was hired by Elkus Manfredi in 1988 as the firm's first employee, and became a principal in 2002.

Recent projects she has led have included an office for Third Rock Ventures, a headquarters for Draper Laboratory, the New Brunswick Performing Arts Center, "boutique hotels" called The White Elephant in Nantucket and Palm Beach, the MassMutual Boston headquarters, and the Georgetown University Student Residences.

== Recognition ==
Lowrey has been named as "One of the Most Influential Bostonians" by Boston Magazine 2019–2024, and one of 10 Outstanding Women Leaders by Boston Real Estate Times She was a winner of the Suzanne King Public Service Award by Crew Boston 2022.

In 2018 she and David Manfredi were jointly awarded the Robert S. Swain Jr. Distinguished Service Award of the Real Estate Finance Association (REFA).

In 2019 she received an Honorary Doctorate in Fine Arts from the Massachusetts College of Art (MassArt).

== Selected publications ==
- "3 ways to make your office more inclusive". Fast Company. 21 December 2023.
- "How Inclusive Design Can Make the Modern Office Work Better". Commercial Observer. 28 October 2023.
- "How many square feet is just the beginning of workplace design". Commercial Observer. 20 March 2023.
- "How Inspired Workplace Design Is Good Business". Banker & Tradesman. 28 August 2022.
- "Good Intentions". In Magazine. 9 January 2022.
- "How to create a workplace for lifelong learning". Boston Business Journal. 1 September 2021.
- "The Workplace Recalibrated". Design Observer. 3 September 2021.
- "The Surprising Way to Build a Productive Organization". Fast Company. 2 June 2021.
- "Office Users Should Embrace a Flexible Post-COVID Setup". Commercial Observer. 12 May 2021.
- "Getting There: A Four Step Process to Identifying Your Hybrid Work Model". Boston Business Journal. April 23, 2021.
