= Matthew Coates =

American architect

- Born: Matthew G. Coates; December 22, 1970 (age 55); Northern Michigan, United States
- Education: University of Illinois Urbana-Champaign
- Occupation: Architect
- Organization: Coates Design Architects + Interiors
- Known for: Sustainable architecture
- Title: Founder and Principal
- Website: https://www.coatesdesign.com

Matthew G. Coates is an American architect based on Bainbridge Island, Washington. He is the founder and principal of Coates Design Architects + Interiors, an architecture and interiors firm known for its emphasis on sustainable architecture and regionally responsive design in the Pacific Northwest. Coates first gained national attention in 2005 after co-leading the winning team in the Cradle to Cradle Home Design Competition, an international sustainable housing contest organized by Metropolis magazine and McDonough Braungart Design Chemistry.

== Early life and education ==
Coates was born and raised in northern Michigan, an environment he described as "ecologically pristine," which influenced his early commitment to environmental stewardship. As a teenager he pursued his interest in architecture; by age 14 he was running blueprints at a local firm, an experience that cemented his passion for sustainable design. He attend Western Michigan University. He received a Bachelor of Architecture from Lawrence Technological University and a Master of Architecture from the University of Illinois Urbana-Champaign, focusing his studies on energy-efficient building systems and green design principles. He moved to Bainbridge Island in the late 1990s after graduate school to begin his professional career.

== Career ==
In 2005, Coates founded Coates Design, Inc. (doing business as Coates Design Architects + Interiors) on Bainbridge Island. The multidisciplinary studio undertakes residential, commercial, and civic projects, with sustainable building practices integrated into all of its work.

Over the years, projects by Coates and his firm have been featured in numerous architecture and design publications. Western Art & Architecture profiled him in 2013 as a "One to Watch," highlighting the firm's philosophy of "Responsible Architecture" and its aim to create buildings with positive environmental impact. In 2023, Gray magazine noted that Coates’ portfolio “includes residential and commercial projects, and sustainable design and building practices are baked into everything they do”.

His work has also been showcased on platforms such as ArchDaily, Amazing Architecture, and Contemporist, as well as in outlets like American Luxury and The New York Times.

One of Coates' most prominent projects is the Bainbridge Island Museum of Art (BIMA), for which he served as lead architect. The 20,000-square-foot art museum opened in 2013 and was designed with extensive sustainable features, including abundant natural daylighting, automated exterior louver screens to control solar gain, and insulation made from recycled materials. The building achieved LEED Gold certification in 2016, reportedly becoming the first newly constructed art museum in Washington state to attain that status.

Coates has also designed other public and commercial buildings in the region, such as the Island Gateway development (which includes the Kids Discovery Museum) and the planned Gateway Center in Grays Harbor. In addition, his firm has worked on a range of custom homes and community projects, reflecting Coates’ interest in housing affordability and reuse of materials (exemplified by the “reHOME” tiny houses initiative using 100% recycled materials).

== Architectural approach ==
Sustainability is a central theme in Coates’ work. He strives to incorporate green technologies and energy-efficient systems in ways that are not visually intrusive – for example, integrating solar panels, rainwater cisterns, and geothermal heating seamlessly into a building's design.

Coates has remarked that there is "no reason that a sustainable or eco-friendly design should cost significantly more than a conventional building," pointing out that efficient building strategies ultimately benefit both the occupants and the environment.

His projects are highly site-responsive, often oriented to maximize natural light and views, and tailored to the client's lifestyle while minimizing ecological impact.

== Selected works ==
- Cradle to Cradle Home – Sustainable house prototype that won the Grand Prize in Metropolis Magazine's Cradle to Cradle Home Competition (2005).
- Bainbridge Island Museum of Art (BIMA) – 20,000 sq. ft. public art museum completed 2013; achieved LEED Gold certification.
- Island Retreat – Modern residential retreat completed in 2015.
- Escalante Escape – Remote vacation home in Escalante, Utah, completed in 2021.
- Olympia Prairie Home – Contemporary rural residence in Washington.
- Hansen Road House – Custom Bainbridge Island home featured in Architect Magazine (2025).

== Awards and recognition ==
- Grand Prize – Cradle to Cradle Home Design Competition (2005)
- LEED Gold Certification – Bainbridge Island Museum of Art (2016)

Coates is a licensed architect (AIA, NCARB) and a LEED Accredited Professional. In 2010, his firm's Ellis Residence on Bainbridge Island was the first home outside Seattle to receive LEED Platinum certification.

== See also ==
- Northwest Regional Style
- Cradle to Cradle design
