= Anne Fougeron =

French-American architect, lecturer and author

Anne Fougeron (born December 7, 1955) is a French-American architect, lecturer and author.

Fougeron has a varied body of works, including commercial, civic, residential and multi-family housing. The Princeton Architectural Press described her style as "embrac[ing] architectural opportunities found in opposition, creating buildings that redefine program, reinvent historical building types, and reinvigorate civic centers. Each project is a careful consideration of context, light and structure." She is known for taking on difficult projects "without sacrificing aesthetics." She is a Fellow of the American Institute of Architects.

Her buildings have been featured in The New York Times, Metropolitan Home, and on the cover of Architectural Record. She has won more than a dozen awards from various chapters of the American Institute of Architects.

She currently lives in the Bay Area.

== Biography and education ==
Fougeron was born in Amsterdam, Netherlands and raised in France and the United States. She received her B.A from Wellesley College and her M.A from UC Berkeley.

In 1989, she opened her own firm, Fougeron Architecture. In 2010, her firm was named one of the 50 best architectural firms in USA by Residential Architect Magazine.

== Publications ==
In August 2011, Princeton Architectural Press published a monograph of Anne Fougeron's works.

After being featured in The New York Times in September, Fougeron's "Flip House" has been featured in over a dozen magazines and blogs, including Architizer and ArchDaily. In June 2014, her firm's project "Fall House" was on the cover of Architectural Record.

To date, her work has been shown in over twenty exhibitions. Her firm has received over 50 design awards and has been featured in over 200 publications. Anne Fougeron has served on over 20 design juries and has presented lecturers on architecture all over the world.

== Architectural work ==
- Kapor Center for Social Impact - Oakland, CA (completed March 2016)
- 400 Grove Street - San Francisco, CA (completed in March 2016)
- Westchester Colonial - Westchester, NY (completed 2014)
- The Fall House – Big Sur, CA (completed May 2013)
- Tehama Grasshopper – San Francisco, CA (completed Jan. 2012)
- Flip House – San Francisco, CA (completed 2012)
- Ingleside Library – San Francisco Public Library branch, California (completed 2009)
- Parkview Terrace – San Francisco, CA (completed 2008)
- Jackson Family Retreat – Big Sur, CA (completed 2006)
