= Harriet Moody =

American architect

- Born: Harriet Jean Moody; May 9, 1891; Santa Barbara, California, United States
- Died: March 9, 1966 (aged 74); Santa Barbara, California, United States
- Occupation: Architect
- Years active: 1912–1950
- Known for: Storybook cottages

Harriet Jean Moody (May 9, 1891 – March 9, 1966) was an American architect who designed distinctive Storybook Cottages in the Santa Barbara, California, area. The Historic Landmarks Commission has been working with the Santa Barbara County Board of Supervisors and Santa Barbara Planning Board to protect the close to three dozen homes known to have been built by her.

== Early life, family and education ==
Harriet Jean Moody was born on May 9, 1891, in Santa Barbara, California, the eldest of five siblings. The four sisters worked together in property development utilizing their skills for a unique "total package"—from design and engineering to planning and interior design to real estate and banking transactions. Harriet was an architect; Brenda was the Santa Barbara County Recorder and later worked in real estate; Wilma was a banker; Mildred studied art at UCLA and did interior designing. Bert, the only boy, became a Palo Alto teacher.

Moody attended college in Santa Barbara and then trained with a local architect by the name of Serferly.

== Career ==
From 1912 to 1922, she worked with her father, a local builder, designing houses. After her father's retirement in 1922, Moody took a job as Assistant City Engineer until 1925. After the 1925 earthquake, she and George Morrison, who had been her boss in the Civil Engineering office, formed a business partnership and worked on planned neighborhoods in Goleta and Isla Vista. In 1932, Moody designed a studio for her sister Mildred at 1086 Coast Village Road. It served as Mildred's art studio and later both an antique shop and tea room. Throughout the 1930s, Moody built small, quaint Storybook Cottages, which were affordable during the Great Depression. Some of the first that she built — six cottages on Periwinkle Lane in Montecito — brought orders for six more on Rosemary Lane.

In the 1940s, George Owen Knapp commissioned Moody to build houses for his workers on his estate Arcady in Montecito. Typically, Harriet designed the spaces; her preferred contractor, Dixon H. MacQuiddy, built the houses; Mildred focused on the interiors and finding antiques; Brenda worked as the escrow or real estate agent; and occasionally Wilma may have provided banking services. As supplies were limited because of World War II rationing, the sisters often used architectural reclamations giving the cottages a unique feel. Many large estates had been dismantled during the depression in an effort to reduce taxes, creating potential for salvage and recycling of the beams, doors, windows, and other fixtures. Moody's work was also typified by high ceilings, various storage areas to fit the irregular spaces, small gabled entryways, board and batten siding, canted corners, diamond-shaped window panes, wall dormers, and multiple roof types, including cross-gabled roofs with pitched slopes, uneven span gables and wood shingle roofing. About three dozen of Moody's designs have been identified and many have been placed on the rolls of the Historic Landmarks Commission, such as the one at 170 Middle Road in Montecito.

== Retirement and death ==
Moody retired in 1950 and died on March 9, 1966, in Santa Barbara.

== Sources ==
- Chafe, Wallace (15 October 1994). Discourse, Consciousness, and Time: The Flow and Displacement of Conscious Experience in Speaking and Writing. Chicago, Illinois: University of Chicago Press. ISBN 978-0-226-10054-8.
- Nye, Ronald L. (25 July 2013). "Phase 1–2 Historic Resources Survey" (PDF). Momma, California: Santa Barbara Planning Board.
