= Paul Florian =

American architect

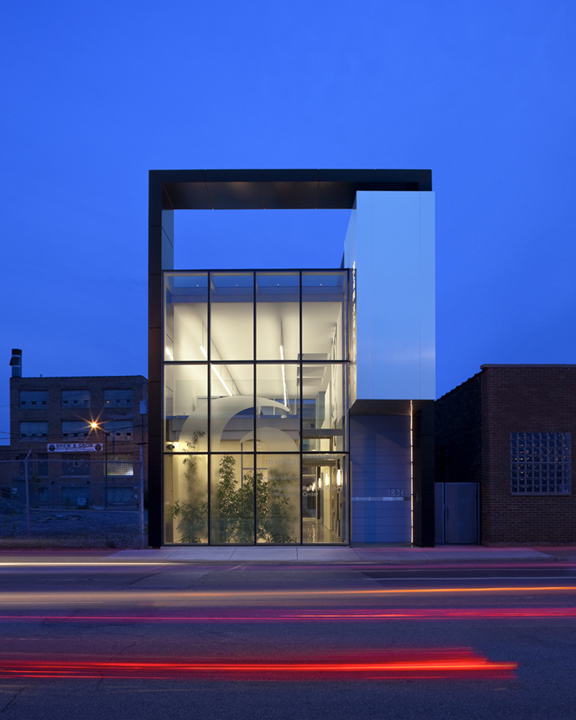
Office Building, Chicago, Illinois Photo: Karant + Associates

Paul Florian (born 1950) is the lead designer at Florian Architects, an architecture firm based in Chicago. Florian’s portfolio includes the renovation of the landmark Hyde Park-Kenwood National Bank Building, retail prototypes and nationwide roll-outs for H2O Plus, Cellular One, and United Audio Centers (Tweeter), retail stores and showrooms for Sotheby’s, Chiasso, and Oilily, museum exhibits for the Art Institute of Chicago and the Museum of Science and Industry, and numerous single- and multi- family residences.

== Biography ==
Florian was born in Chicago and lived there with his family until his sophomore year of high school when he left to study at the Portsmouth Abbey School, a Benedictine boarding school in Portsmouth, Rhode Island. Upon graduation in 1968, he studied art history at Johns Hopkins University in Baltimore for two years. He then moved to St. Louis to pursue architecture at the Sam Fox School of Design & Visual Arts at Washington University in St. Louis and, in 1973, he earned a Bachelor of Liberal Arts degree with a major in architecture.

After completing his undergraduate education, Paul Florian moved to London and worked as a project designer for two years in the office of Sir Robert Matthew Johnson-Marshall and Partners Architects RMJM under the direction of David Lloyd Jones. From 1975 to 1978, Florian attended the Architectural Association School of Architecture, concentrating his studies in urban design under the direction of Léon Krier and earning a Diploma Degree. Colleagues at the Architectural Association included David Chipperfield, Zaha Hadid, Susannah Hagan, and Ben Nicholson.

Florian returned from England to the Chicago area in 1978 and worked for two years as a project designer for the architecture firm Holabird and Root. From 1981 to 1982, he attended the School of Architecture at the University of Illinois at Chicago, receiving a Master of Architecture degree. As a graduate student, he taught in the undergraduate program at UIC School of Architecture and curated the exhibition “Architecture and the City” at Chicago's Museum of Science and Industry.

Paul Florian's teaching career at the University of Illinois at Chicago continued for over a decade, from 1981 until 1994. During his tenure the School of Architecture was directed initially by Thomas Hall Beeby and subsequently by Stanley Tigerman. Florian later taught several graduate studios at the Illinois Institute of Technology. His academic experience also includes acting as juror at the Art Institute of Chicago's Schiff Foundation Fellowship for Architectural Achievement, the School of the Art Institute of Chicago, Yale University, and Harvard University. In 2019, Paul Florian taught an advanced design studio at the Yale School of Architecture as Robert A. M. Stern Visiting Professor.

Florian opened an architectural practice called Florian Associates in Chicago's River North area in 1983. Three years later he and Stephen Wierzbowski formed Florian Wierzbowski Architecture. The firm was reorganized in 1996 and renamed Florian Architects. In 1991, Architectural Digest featured the firm in the issue “The World's Foremost Architects.” Florian Architects' work has been exhibited at the Art Institute of Chicago, the Museum of Contemporary Art in Chicago, the Chicago History Museum, the Cooper-Hewitt in New York, the Queens Museum of Art in New York, and the Calouste Gulbenkian Foundation in Lisbon.

== Awards and recognition ==
Paul Florian is a Fellow of the American Institute of Architects. Projects under his design direction have won over 25 major awards for design excellence, including a National AIA Honor Award, an AIA Illinois Frank Lloyd Wright Award, and 12 AIA Chicago awards, as well as awards and citations from the magazine publishers of Progressive Architecture, Architectural Digest, Interiors, Industrial Design, and Visual Merchandising and Space Design.

== Publications ==
- Mitchell, Heidi. "A Gothic Revival in Kenwood With a Killer Art Collection" Chicago Magazine (August 2019).
- Rappaport, Nina. "Paul Florian" Constructs Journal of the Yale School of Architecture (Spring 2019) 4.
- Connors, Thomas. "Trees of Life" CS Interiors (Fall/Winter 2016) 64-67.
- Signature Homes Dallas, TX: Panache Partners, 2015.
- Cescon, Marina. "Interview with Paul Florian" Acciaio Arte Architectura (January 2015).
- "Hyde Park Bank Loan Processing Center" AIA Guide to Chicago Architecture University of Illinois Press, 2014.
- Perspectives on Design Chicago Dallas, TX: Panache Partners, 2010.
- Connors, Thomas. "Lend a Hand" Interior Design (March 2010) 54-56.
- Williams, Homer, The Design and Planning of Financial Institutions New York: John Wiley & Sons, 2010.
- Rogers, Monica. "The Air Up There" Chicago Tribune (June 5, 2009).
- Wheeler, Liz. "Banking Architecture as Subliminal Marketing" North Western Financial Review (April 15, 2009) 18-19.
- Coates, Anthony. "Art of Glass" Trends (August 2008) 52-59.
- Sullivan, Karin Horgan. "Backstory" Chicago Home. (March/April 2008) 80-88.
- Dream Homes Chicago Dallas, TX: Panache Partners, 2007.
- Connors, Thomas. "Letting in the Light" Art & Antiques (October 2007) 80-85.
- Newman, Christine. "Park Place" Chicago Magazine (August 2007) 118-126.
- Pridmore, Jay. "He’ll Always Have Paris" Interior Design (June 2007) 192-199.
- Newman, Christine. "Lighten Up" Chicago Magazine (June 2006) 100-108.
- Schulman, Patricia. "Drama Redefined" Chicago Home (Summer 2006) 66-75.
- Kamin, Blair. "Hyde Park Bank Chicago" Architectural Record (March 2005) 136-138.
- Kamin, Blair. "No Guarantees" Chicago Tribune (February 24, 2005).
