= Fred Earl Norris Jr. =

American architect (1923–2006)

- Born: April 11, 1923; San Diego California
- Died: November 9, 2006 (aged 83)
- Occupation: Architect
- Years active: 1952 - 2006

Fred Earl Norris Jr. (April 11, 1923 - November 9, 2006) was an American architect with a degree in architecture from University of California, Berkeley. With a preference for the Mid-century modern style, he designed more than 250 homes on individual sites throughout Southern California, from the mid-1950s to his retirement to Maui Hawaii in 1998. Notable Norris projects include designing and developing "Hollywood Park" in 1959 at North Pacific Beach, San Diego, an enclave of 13 mid-century homes; the residence of G.G. (Gilbert George) Budwig, aviation pioneer and early Director of Air Regulation for the U.S. Department of Commerce; and the Robert Martinet residence (for the former San Diego City Councilman). Both residences are located on Mission Bay, San Diego County and were featured in the Los Angeles Times when first built. In addition to numerous residential projects and a few commercial designs, Norris is credited with the design and supervision of the 1988 construction of the seawall on Ka'anapali Beach, Maui, located in front of the Maui Kai condo resort and known as the Fred Norris Seawall. A bronze plaque with his name is attached to it.

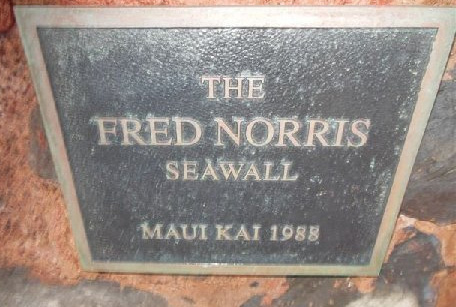
The plaque in honor of Fred Norris at Maui Kai

== Partial Listing of Projects ==
- Fred Norris Residence, 6336 La Jolla Boulevard, La Jolla (1952)
- G.G. Budwig Residence, Mission Bay (1958)
- Robert Martinet Residence, 1069 E. Briarfield Drive, San Diego (1960)
- Gene Littler Residence, Los Morros, Rancho Santa Fe
- "Hollywood Park"

1210, 1218, 1230, 1234, 1242, 1248 and 1254 Turquoise Street; 1211, 1217, 1223, 1233 and 1237 Agate Street; 5210 Cardeno Drive, San Diego (1959-1960)

- 375 Via del Norte, La Jolla (1954)
- Peck Buick Dealership, Midway District, San Diego
- Coberly Ford Dealership, Burbank
