= Stephen Child =

American architect

Stephen Child (1866–1936) was an American architect and landscape architect. He received his undergraduate degree from MIT in 1888 in civil engineering. He served as the deputy street commissioner and superintendent of the sewer department in Newton, Massachusetts between 1891 and 1901. Child studied under Frederick Law Olmsted, Jr. at Harvard between 1901 and 1903 and designed several parks in California as well as one of the first proposals for the Cambridge campus of MIT. He also designed the Colonia Solana allotment in Tucson. Stephen Child is buried in Painesville, Ohio.
