= Hyde Park–Kenwood National Bank Building =

Office building in Chicago

Coordinates: 41.7994°N 87.5884°W

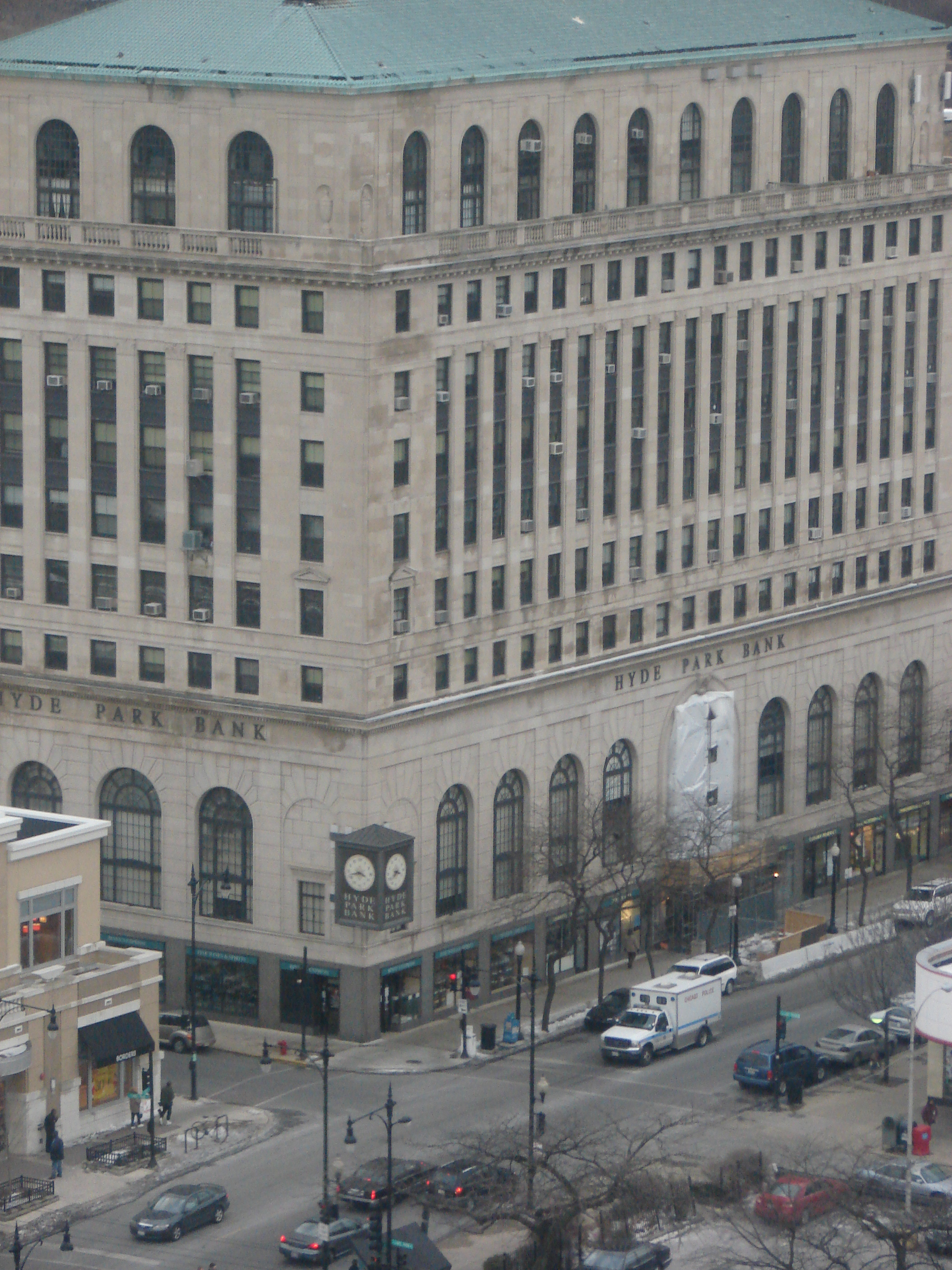
- Hyde Park–Kenwood National Bank Building, built in 1928–29. This image was taken from the adjacent elevated Metra Electric railroad tracks; the presence of a commuter station on the elevated electric railway was an essential element in the construction of the bank building.

General information
- Type: Bank
- Architectural style: Art Deco
- Opened: 1929

Design and construction
- Architecture firm: K.M. Vitzthum & Co

The Hyde Park–Kenwood National Bank Building was built in 1928–29 at 1525 East 53rd Street, Chicago, Illinois, as the headquarters and sole business location of the Hyde Park–Kenwood National Bank, a community bank that served the Chicago neighborhood of Hyde Park. When opened for business in April 1929, this 10-story structure was the largest bank building in Chicago outside of the Chicago Loop. The building was designed by K.M. Vitzthum & Co. in the Classical Revival style, with some Art Deco ornamentation; it is faced with Bedford stone. The facade and the second floor main banking hall were renovated by Florian Architects under the design direction of Paul Florian in 2005. The building is now a Chicago Landmark.

The Hyde Park-Kenwood National bank taken from street level during the day and then the same spot taken at night, showing the installed floodlights as well as the construction of the bank one year after it was built.

The Hyde Park–Kenwood National Bank, controlled by banker-developer John A. Carroll, was meant to be a pillar of its Chicago neighborhood. Like other bank buildings constructed before the Great Depression, the Hyde Park Bank Building was built to serve as a multi-purpose facility, with the building's 53rd Street frontage rented out to retail stores, the bank's public space occupying the interior of the first floor and all of the second floor, back-office facilities occupying more space, and additional office space set aside for rental by independent professionals such as physicians and lawyers. A thriving nearby electric railway station made this a prime location for capital-intensive development.

Constructed for $2 million (equivalent to $29.5 million in 2025), this bank building opened only six months before the Crash of 1929, which permanently affected the U.S. banking business. As a result of the Great Depression, the building's flagship institution, Hyde Park–Kenwood National Bank, closed permanently in June 1932; depositors were eventually paid off in full, but had to wait until World War II for the final payout. However, another chartered bank then occupied the unused financial space, and the 1929 structure continued in use for banking purposes as of 2012.

The bank building is built on the historic location of the town hall of the former Hyde Park Township, the municipal government of independent Hyde Park prior to annexation by the city of Chicago in 1889.
