= Robert von Ezdorf =

American architect

- Born: August 15, 1889; Philadelphia, Pennsylvania
- Died: March 26, 1956 (aged 66); Summit, New Jersey
- Occupation: Architect
- Spouse: Florence Burke
- Buildings: Waldorf-Astoria; Hotel Hershey; Commodore Hotel
- Projects: The Secret City

Robert von Ezdorf (August 15, 1889 – March 26, 1956) was an American architect and composer.

He specialized in high-rise office buildings and also designed the interiors of the Commodore Hotel, the Waldorf-Astoria and Hotel Hershey as well as the Wharton School of the University of Pennsylvania. He worked for the firm of Cross and Cross where he served as chief designer. He also worked at McKim, Mead, and White. Von Ezdorf also designed much of Oak Ridge's Secret City, including the reactor used in developing the atomic bomb.

== Biography ==
He was born on August 15, 1889, in Philadelphia, Pennsylvania.

Von Ezdorf initially intended to embark on a career in music and studied music until he was 16. He then changed his focus to building design and earned a degree in architecture from George Washington University in 1912. He studied drawing under Nathan C. Wyeth. He served in World War I as a 31st Aero Squadron lieutenant and was the first officer of that rank from Queens to be sent abroad. He later served as a bird colonel during World War II.

He died in Summit, New Jersey on March 26, 1956.
