= Harriet Morrison Irwin =

American architect

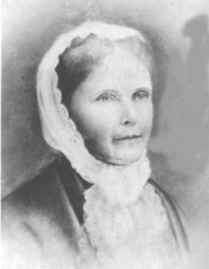
- Born: Harriet Abigail Morrison; 1828; Mecklenburg County, North Carolina, U.S.
- Died: 1897 (aged 68–69); Charlotte, North Carolina, U.S.
- Resting place: Elmwood Cemetery (Charlotte, North Carolina)
- Education: Salem College
- Occupation: Architect
- Years active: 1869–1871
- Notable work: U.S. Patent #94,116; Contributor for The Land We Love; The Hermit of Petraea
- Spouse: James P. Irwin
- Father: Robert Hall Morrison
- Relatives: Daniel Harvey Hill (brother-in-law); Stonewall Jackson (brother-in-law)

Harriet Abigail Morrison Irwin (1828 – 1897) was an American architect and the first American woman to patent an architectural design. On August 24, 1869, she submitted a patent, categorized under the Improvement in the Construction of Houses, for a residential design proposal of a hexagonal house. Her husband and brother-in-law would go on to form a company to construct houses based on her design in the Charlotte area.

== Life ==
Born to Reverend Robert Hall Morrison and Mary Graham Morrison in 1828, she was home schooled by her father, president of Davidson College and later attended the Salem Female Academy in North Carolina. She had five sisters – Isabella Sophia Hill, Eugenia Erixene Barringer, Susan Washington Avery, Laura Panthea Brown, and Mary Anna Jackson - and 4 brothers - Joseph Graham, Robert Hall, Alfred James, and William Alexander She married James P. Irwin in 1849 at the age of 21, and they moved to Charlotte, North Carolina where they had nine children. Later, they lived together at 912 West Fifth Street in a home designed using Irwin's patent. She died in 1897 and is buried in Elmwood Cemetery in Charlotte.

== Career ==
She wrote for the magazine, The Land We Love, edited Daniel Harvey Hill and co-founded by her husband James. Her articles consisted of romance and historical stories, as well as articles on church policies. A construction boom in Charlotte in 1869 renewed her interest in engineering and architecture, and later that year she filed a patent for a residence. Plagued by illnesses throughout her life, she designed a home to fit the needs of an invalid housekeeper, taking inspiration from books and articles she read while tending to her home. She studied works by Bindon Blood Stoney, an Irish engineer, and John Ruskin, an English Architect, who believed that buildings should have plenty of access to the outdoors and that nature contributed to people's mental power and good health. She was also influenced by Orson Squire Fowler's work The Octagon House: A Home for All which promoted an octagonal house, but Irwin eventually decided the hexagon was a more fitting shape because hexagonal rooms could be nested inside a hexagonal exterior, self-described as lozenge-shaped.

On August 24, 1869, at the age of 41, she received patent number 94,116 for her design of a six-sided house. The patent emphasized more-efficient lighting, better movement of air, and better use of space. Even the rooms in Irwin's house were six-sided. To promote her patent Irwin wrote the book, The Hermit of Petraea, in 1871, in which she discussed her ideas of health, the outdoors and how hexagonal living could promote physical well-being. That same year, she, her husband and her brother-in-law Daniel Harvey Hill organized the Hill and Irwin Land Agency which specialized in hexagonal homes, at least two houses were built in Charlotte based on Irwin's patent, since demolished. The patent details the design of the house, from its six-sided exterior construction, to the division of the resulting hexagon into three smaller hexagons and several smaller diamond-shaped rooms in the corners to serve as storage, stairwells, or porches, a central chimney stack at the junction of the three main rooms, and a mansard roof. A key feature of the plan was an economical use of building materials by a skilled architect, wherein a larger area could be enclosed with the same length of perimeter material, and she personally thought that a hexagonal building offered more aesthetic opportunities than the rectilinear standard.

She described her design in her patent letter: "My invention consists of a welling-house or other building, hexagonal in form, and enclosing a space separated into hexagonal and lozenge-shaped rooms, ... also of a chimney-stack, arranged at the junction of the walls of the adjacent rooms, and containing flues communicating with the fire-places in several rooms." She goes on to say, "The objects of my invention are the economizing of space and building-materials, the obtaining of economical heating mediums, thorough lighting and ventilation, and facilities for inexpensive ornamentation."

== Legacy ==
While her design for a hexagonal home may not have become as popular as she had hoped, her initial foray into the field of architecture paved the way for later women architects, including Louise Bethune, the first professional woman architect in America. As with several other women trying to break into the field of architecture in the mid-1800s, her work focused on domestic sphere and the residence, in alignment with public sentiment of the time, but was an instrumental step in achieving admittance and earning respect in a field largely regarded as a job for men.

There is much debate about the originality of her hexagonal plan, as Orson Fowler, a phrenologist, published a book in 1848 outlining an octagonal house that was "based on the saving of space, economy of materials, [and] felicity of ventilation." A Home for All bears striking resemblance to many of the virtues espoused by Irwin, and an interview with the local newspaper revealed she was familiar with the fad that originated in New York and spread throughout the Northeast, though she insisted her work was totally original and of a different nature than the former. The octagonal format house saw significant development in the mid-1800s but died out around the start of the civil war, due in part to the thoroughness of the author who developed floor plans for each floor of the house, variations in room layout, construction plans, and significant discussions of each design decision made possible by its format as a book, whereas Irwin's patent had few due to its format as a patent letter.

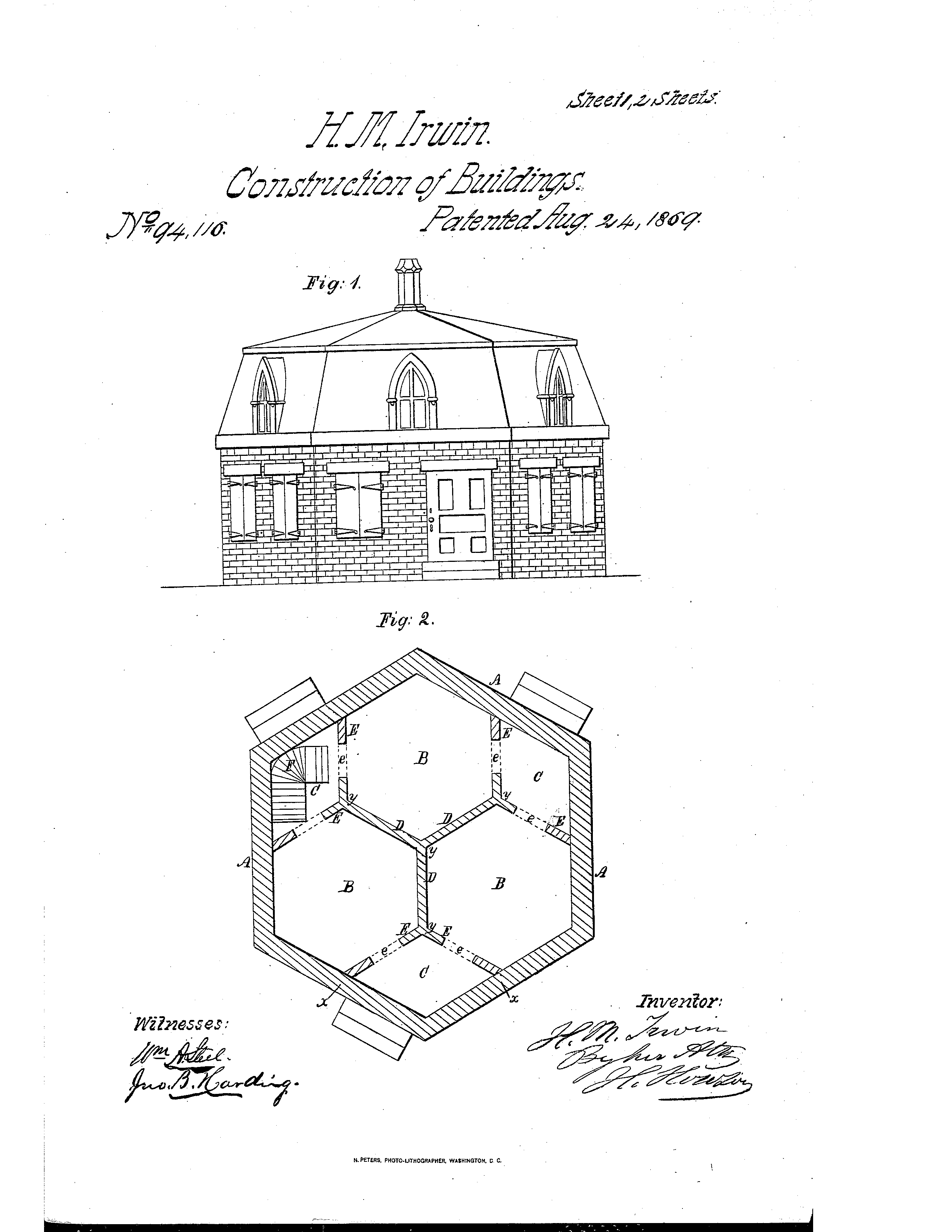
US Patent No 94116

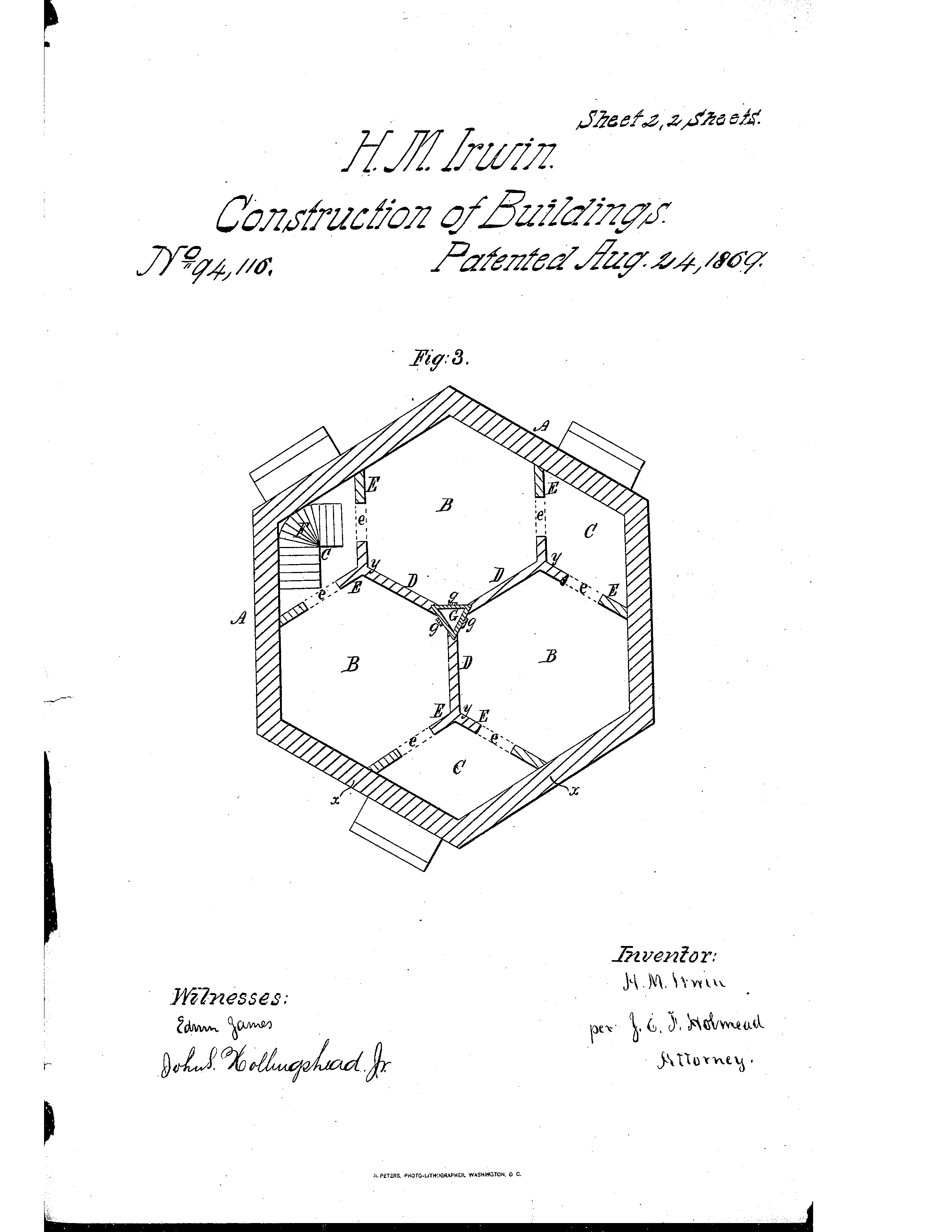
US Patent No 94116
