= Charles Souders Paget =

American architect (1874–1933)

Charles Souders Paget (born 1874, New Jersey; died 1933) was an American architect active in Canton, China during the late 19th and early 20th century.

== Biography ==
Charles Souders Paget (often known as Charles Paget) was born in 1874 in New Jersey. As an adult he traveled to Canton, China as an architect.

Paget was the top architect in Canton around the turn of the 20th century. He often met the presidents of China, Sun Yat-Sen and Chiang Kai-shek at the time, and invited them to his apartment to stay and work.

Sun Yat-Sen's residence and office, the Marshal House, was designed by Paget, as were many of the buildings constructed in Canton during this time period, like the urban police department and the urban fire station.

== Legacy ==
Paget's house still stands at No.6, Bak Hok Tung Rd., which is inside the Eldly-caring of Canton Shipyard. It could be called the "Canton White House" since two presidents often stayed and worked there.

The area where the house is located used to be the living zone for westerners.
