= Joe Mashburn =

American architect

Joseph Mashburn, AIA, has been the Dean of the Gerald D. Hines College of Architecture at the University of Houston in Houston, Texas since August, 1998. This came shortly after being inducted into UH's Architecture Hall of Fame in 1996. Mashburn stepped down from his post at Hines in December 2009 and was replaced by Patricia Oliver. He has continued to teach at the college. He was also named to the American Institute of Architects' College of Fellows in 2010.

He received his Bachelor of Architecture from University of Houston in 1978. In 1982, he earned a Master of Architecture degree from Texas A&M University.

He served as an assistant professor and graduate design coordinator at A&M from 1982 to 1988 and in 1989 moved to Virginia Tech.

He has received the Association of Collegiate Schools of Architecture Design Award, the Virginia Society AIA Award for Excellence in Architecture, and the Committee of Heads of Australian Schools of Architecture Design Award.
