= Dan Kirby (architect) =

American architect

Daniel Kirby, FAIA, FAICP is an Orlando, Florida-based architect and urban planner. Originally, from Newark, New Jersey, Kirby is currently a principal with Jacobs. Kirby is a recipient of the Gold Medal from the Florida Association of the American Institute of Architects (AIA Florida) and was the first black president in the organization's century-plus history. In addition, Kirby was previously president of the Orlando Utilities Commission. Kirby was named a fellow of the American Institute of Architects in 2016 and a fellow of the American Institute of Certified Planners in 2018.

== Early life and education ==
Kirby grew up in Newark, New Jersey and Orlando, Florida. Kirby received a Bachelor of Design in architecture from the University of Florida. He received a Master of Architecture and a Master of Urban Planning from the University of Michigan.

== Career ==
After graduating from the University of Michigan, Kirby started his career with HHCP Architects. In 2007, Kirby served as vice chairman of the Orange County (Florida) Urban Design Commission. He founded Premiere Cities Group, LLC in 2011. In 2011, Kirby was vice president for advocacy of AIA Florida in 2011. When Kirby was incoming president in 2012, the Florida Association of the American Institute of Architects (AIA Florida) had 3,300 members. Kirby served as chair of the design and infrastructure committee of the Orange County Housing for All Task Force in 2019. As of 2021, Kirby was a member of the board of directors for Architects Foundation.

== Awards and honors ==
- Gold Medal, Florida Association of the American Institute of Architects
- Silver Medal, Florida Association of the American Institute of Architects
- Medal of Honor, Orlando Chapter of the American Institute of Architects 2015
