= List of critics =

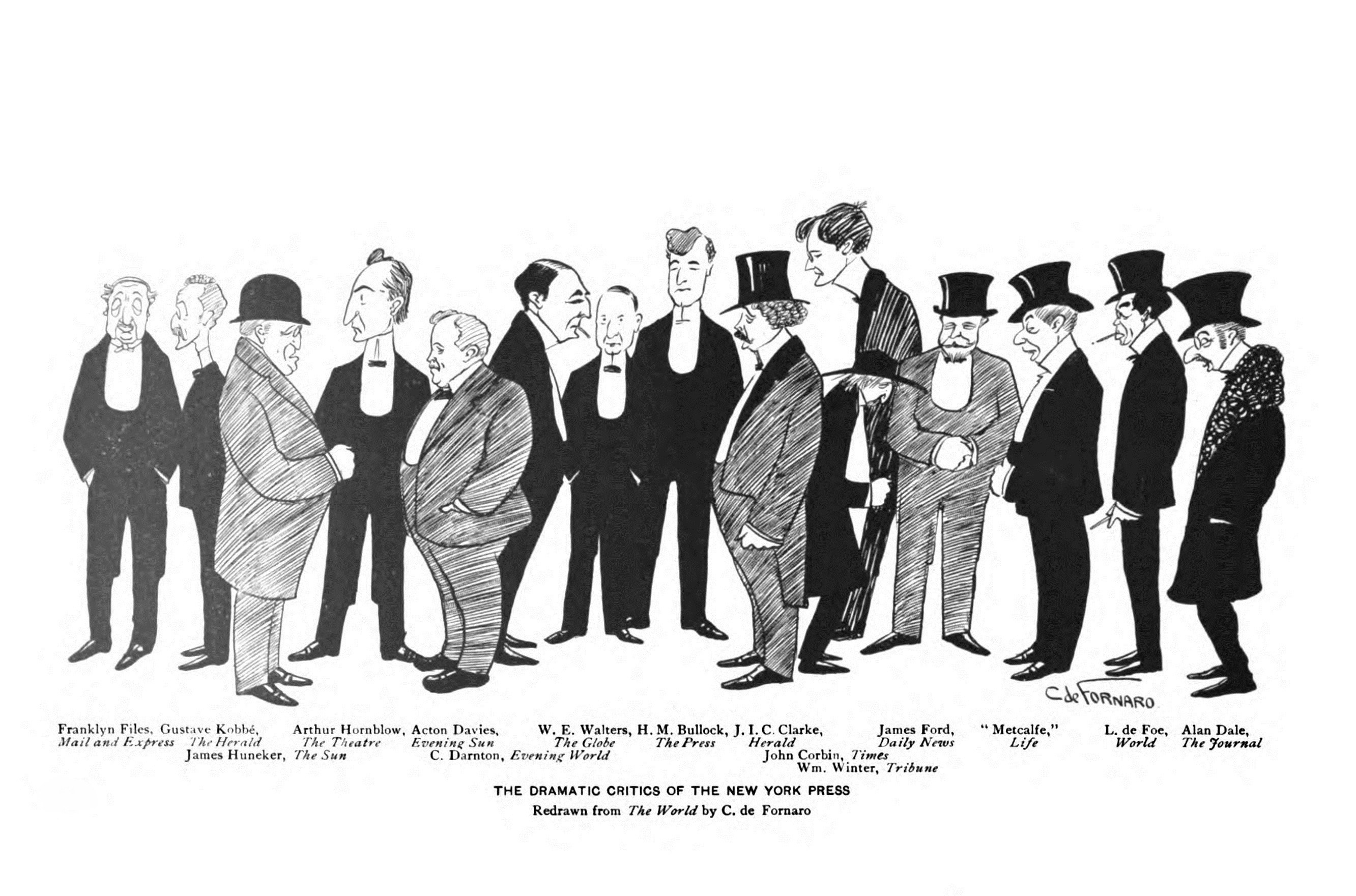
New York critics of 1904 including Gustav Kobbé and James Huneker

This is a list of critics for various artistic disciplines.

== Architecture ==
- Allison Arieff
- Robert Campbell
- Justine Clark
- Justin Davidson
- Martin Filler
- Kenneth Frampton
- Elizabeth Farrelly
- Jonathan Glancey
- Paul Goldberger
- Laura Harding
- Edwin Heathcote
- Ada Louise Huxtable
- Blair Kamin
- Philip Kennicott
- Michael Kimmelman
- Alexandra Lange
- Wanda Lau
- Nancy Levinson
- Esther McCoy
- Cathleen McGuigan
- Rowan Moore
- Lewis Mumford
- Herbert Muschamp
- Hugh Pearman
- Christian Narkiewicz-Laine
- Nicolai Ouroussoff
- Aline B. Saarinen
- Inga Saffron
- Catherine Slessor
- Michael Sorkin
- Naomi Stead
- Allan Temko
- Oliver Wainwright

== Fashion ==
- Kennedy Fraser
- Derek Guy

== Literature ==
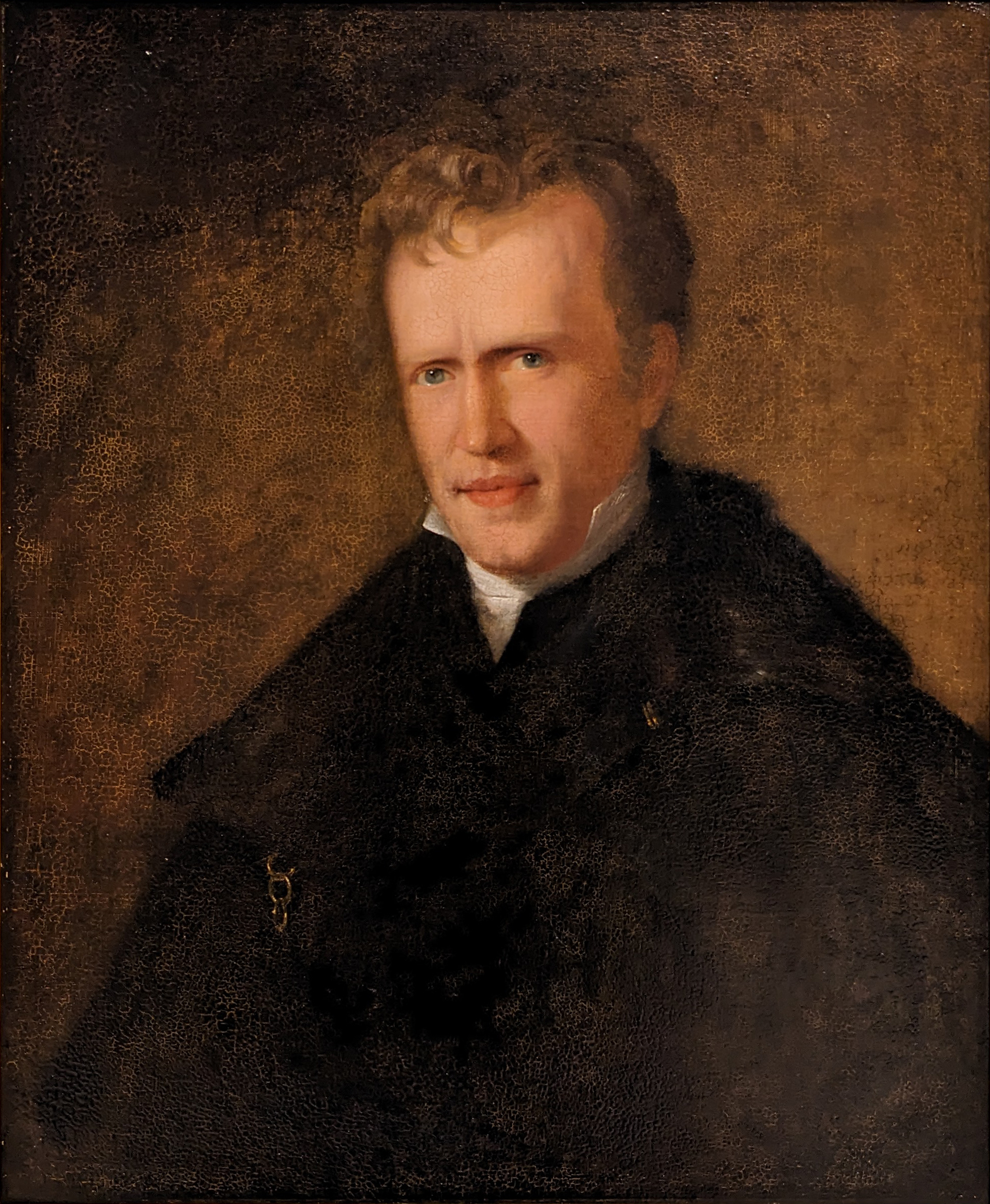
John Neal, early American literary critic

- Harold Bloom
- Saveria Chemotti
- Jonathan Dollimore
- Frances Ferguson
- Stanley Fish
- Northrop Frye
- Susan Gubar
- Jeanne Halbwachs
- Claudia L. Johnson
- Frank Kermode
- Iya Kiva
- C. S. Lewis
- David Lodge
- Marshall McLuhan
- Ira B. Nadel
- Azar Nafisi
- John Neal
- Marie Louise Obenauer
- Eli Siegel
- Lionel Trilling
- Geeta Tripathee

== Theater ==
- Ben Brantley
- Richard L. Coe
- David Cote
- Charles Isherwood
- Walter Kerr
- Octavian Saiu
- John Simon
- Larry Stark
- Alexander Woollcott

== Television ==
- Álvaro Cueva
- Andy Dehnart
- John Doyle
- Ian Hyland
- Marvin Kitman
- Frazier Moore
- James Poniewozik
- Alan Sepinwall
- Tom Shales
- Jim Shelley
- Alessandra Stanley
- Jay Nelson Tuck

== Other disciplines ==
- Jacques Barzun
- Walter Benjamin
- Whitwell Elwin (1816–1900) – literature and social
- bell hooks
- Camille Paglia
- Susan Sontag

== See also ==
- List of chief music critics
- Lists of people by occupation
