= Architecture criticism =

Architecture criticism is the critique of architecture. Everyday criticism relates to published or broadcast critiques of buildings, whether completed or not, both in terms of news and other criteria. In many cases, criticism amounts to an assessment of the architect's success in meeting their own aims and objectives and those of others. The assessment may consider the subject from the perspective of some wider context, which may involve planning, social or aesthetic issues. It may also take a polemical position reflecting the critic's own values. At the most accessible extreme, architectural criticism is a branch of lifestyle journalism, especially in the case of high-end residential projects.

== Media coverage ==
Most major national newspapers in developed countries cover the arts in some form. Architectural criticism may be included as a part of their arts coverage, in a real estate section or a Home & Style supplement. In the US, reviews are published in specialist magazines ranging from the popular (e.g. Architectural Digest, Wallpaper) to specialist magazines for design professionals (e.g. Architectural Review, DETAIL). As with other forms of criticism, technical language is used to a varying extent to convey impressions and views precisely. The rapidly changing media environment means that much criticism is now published in online journals and publications, and critics write for a range of publications rather than being employed full-time by newspapers.

Lewis Mumford wrote extensively on architecture in the nineteen thirties, forties and fifties at The New Yorker. Ada Louise Huxtable was the first full-time architecture critic working for an American daily newspaper when The New York Times gave her the role in 1963. John Betjeman, a co-founder of the Victorian Society, wrote and broadcast from the 1950s to 1970s, principally covering historical rather than new buildings, but contributing to a trend for criticism to expand into radio and then television. Charles, Prince of Wales, is outspoken in his criticism of modern architecture, memorably describing a proposed extension to the National Gallery in London as a "monstrous carbuncle on the face of a much-loved friend".

In 2017, the New Architecture Writers program was established in London to address the underrepresentation of black and minority ethnic writers in architecture and design criticism and curation. The free program was initiated by Phineas Harper and Tom WiIkinson and aims to develop the journalistic skill, editorial connections and critical voice of its participants. It is supported by the Architectural Review, The Architecture Foundation, the Royal College of Art and the RIBA Journal. Inaugural participants were Josh Fenton, Shukri Sultan, Thomas Aquilina, Aoi Phillips, Nile Bridgeman, Samson Famusan, Siufan Adey, Tara Okeke, and Marwa El Mubark.

== Changing contexts ==
The rapidly changing media landscape has impacted on architectural criticism and shifted both modes of criticism and the media in which it is published. Recent books that explore these issues include Writing About Architecture: Mastering the Language of Buildings and Cities by Alexandra Lange (2012) and Semi-detached: Writing, representation and criticism in architecture, edited by Naomi Stead (2012).

A number of essays also reflect on the contemporary state of architectural criticism, the changing media and contexts of production, and the futures of criticism. These include:

- Thomas Fisher, “The Death and Life of Great Architecture Criticism,” Places Journal, December 2011
- Eva Hagberg Fisher, “Criticism in Crisis,” Architect magazine, December 2018
- Blair Kamin, “Architecture Criticism: Dead or Alive?” Nieman Reports, July 2015
- Alexandra Lange, “How to Be an Architecture Critic,” Places Journal, March 2012
- Nancy Levinson, “Critical Beats,” Places Journal, March 2010
- Nancy Levinson, “Print and Pixel,” Places Journal, October 2013.
- Michael Sorkin, “Critical Mass: Why Architectural Criticism Matters,” The Architectural Review, May 2014
- Naomi Stead, "A New Belle-Lettrism and the Future of Criticism," Places Journal, June 2012.

== Criteria ==
The critic's task is to assess how successful the architect and others involved with the project have been in meeting both the criteria the project set out to meet and those that the critic himself feels to be important. Specific criteria include:

- Aesthetics
- Proportion
- Functionality
- Architectural style
- Choice and use of building materials
- Built environment or context
- Sustainability

== Architectural journalists and critics ==
Some large newspapers have permanent architecture critics, however many critics now write for multiple publications and many new online venues are emerging. Contemporary critics writing for major newspapers, journals and online publications include:

=== Canada ===
- Alex Bozikovic, staff columnist and architecture critic, The Globe and Mail (Toronto)

=== Netherlands ===
- Hans Teerds, Archined, De Architect

=== Spain ===
- Ariadna Cantis, El País newspaper (Madrid)
- Fredy Massad (argentine architect), ABC newspaper (Madrid, and Seville)
- Luis Alemany, El Mundo newspaper (Madrid)
- Llàtzer Moix, La Vanguardia newspaper (Barcelona)

=== United States ===
- Marianela D’Aprile, bylines in Common Edge, Jacobin magazine, Surface Magazine, Metropolis, Cultured, The Architect's Newspaper
- Allison Arieff of SPUR and formerly Dwell
- Diana Budds, bylines in publications including Curbed, Vox, CoDesign
- Robert Campbell, architecture critic for The Boston Globe
- Justin Davidson of New York Magazine
- Martin Filler of The New York Review of Books
- Eva Hagberg Fisher, bylines in The New York Times, Tin House, Wallpaper*, Wired, and Dwell.
- Paul Goldberger of Vanity Fair (formerly of The New Yorker)
- Christopher Hawthorne, former architecture critic of the Los Angeles Times (2004–2018) and Slate
- Cathy Lang Ho, contributing editor Architect magazine, founding editor-in-chief of The Architect’s Newspaper, with bylines in many other publications.
- Karrie Jacobs, contributing editor Architect magazine and founding editor of Dwell, with bylines in many other publications, including New York Magazine, The New York Times, ID, and Fortune.
- Sean Joyner, Archinect.
- Amanda Kolson Hurley, senior editor of CityLab with bylines in many other publications, including Architect magazine, Architectural Record, The American Scholar, The Atlantic, CNN, Curbed, Foreign Policy, Landscape Architecture, Next City, The Times Literary Supplement, Wallpaper, Washington City Paper, Washingtonian, and The Washington Post.
- Blair Kamin of the Chicago Tribune
- Nancy Keates of the "Wall Street Journal"
- Kelsey Keith, editor-in-chief Curbed
- Philip Kennicott, art and architecture critic of The Washington Post
- Michael Kimmelman of The New York Times
- John King, architecture critic for San Francisco Chronicle
- Nicholas Korody, Archinect, editor-in-chief, Ed
- Mark Lamster, Dallas Morning News, formerly of Places
- Alexandra Lange, architecture critic at Curbed with bylines in many other publications
- Wanda Lau, editor at Architect magazine
- Nancy Levinson, editor of Places
- Steven Litt, The Plain Dealer
- Cathleen McGuigan, editor-in-chief Architectural Record
- Shannon Mattern, columnist at Places
- Carolina Miranda, architecture critic for The Los Angeles Times
- Christian Narkiewicz-Laine (formerly of The Chicago Sun-Times)
- Nicolai Ouroussoff formerly of The New York Times
- Anne Quito, design reporter for ''Quartz'' (publication)
- Anjulie Rao, editor of Chicago Architect, bylines in American Craft Magazine, Chicago Magazine, Artsy, and Curbed Chicago
- Inga Saffron, architecture critic, The Philadelphia Inquirer since 1999
- Mary Louise Schumacher, former art and architecture critic, Milwaukee Journal Sentinel (2000–2019)
- Matt Shaw, former executive editor, The Architect's Newspaper, bylines in The New York Times, The Guardian, and many others.
- Michael Sorkin
- Susan Szenasy, Metropolis
- Kate Wagner, McMansion Hell, with bylines in many other publications
- Alissa Walker, urbanism editor, Curbed
- Mimi Zeiger, opinion columnist Dezeen, contributing editor Architect, and bylines in many other publications, including The New York Times, Domus, The Architectural Review, and The Architects Newspaper.

=== United Kingdom ===
- Shumi Bose, The Architectural Review and other publications
- Gillian Darley, Building Design (now) BDonline), Apollo, London Review of Books and many other titles, formerly The Observer
- Jonathan Glancey, The Guardian
- Edwin Heathcote, The Financial Times
- Priya Khanchandani, editor, Icon magazine
- Manon Mollard, editor, The Architectural Review
- Rowan Moore, The Observer
- Christine Murray, editor of The Developer, former editor in chief of Architects Journal and The Architectural Review, writing include The Guardian, Dezeen
- Hugh Pearman, editor of RIBA Journal, former architecture and design critic for The Sunday Times (1986–2016), bylines in many publications including The Guardian, The Observer, The Wall Street Journal, The New York Times, Newsweek, Art Quarterly, Royal Academy Magazine, Crafts, Architectural Record, the Architectural Review, and World of Interiors
- Catherine Slessor, Dezeen, Architects Journal, former editor and managing editor of The Architectural Review
- Oliver Wainwright, The Guardian

=== Australia ===
- Judith Abell, bylines include Architecture Australia, Landscape Architecture Australia, Artlink and others, Arts Features editor for Island Magazine
- Justine Clark, editor of Architecture Australia from 2003 to 2011 and the recipient of the Bates Smart Award for Architecture in the Media in 2009, 2011, 2013 and 2015, former architecture critic for The Age, contributor to publications including Architecture New Zealand, MAS Context, and others.
- Laura Harding, Architecture Australia, The Guardian, The Saturday Paper
- Rory Hyde (also UK), bylines include Architecture Australia, The Guardian, Harvard Design Magazine among others
- Helen Norrie, bylines include Architecture Australia, Australian Design Review.
- Timothy Moore, editor Future West (Australian Urbanism) (2016–2019), editor Architecture Australia (2011–2012), managing editor Volume (2010–11), curator of architecture and design at the National Gallery of Victoria (2022-), and editor Memo Review Architecture (2024-)
- David Neustein, architecture critic, The Monthly
- Naomi Stead columnist at Places (US), architecture critic for The Saturday Paper, architecture columnist for The Conversation, bylines in Architecture Australia

== See also ==
- Category:Architecture critics
- Category: Architecture writers
- International Committee of Architectural Critics
- Category:American architecture writers
- Category: Australian architecture writers
- Category:British architecture writers
