= Khaled Malas =

Syrian architect and art historian (born 1981)

- خالد ملص
- Born: 1981 (age 44–45); Damascus, Syria

Khaled Malas (Arabic: خالد ملص) is a Syrian architect and art historian. He is principal and co-founder of the Sigil Collective, alongside Salim al-Kadi, Alfred Tarazi and Jana Traboulsi.

Malas studied architecture at the American University of Beirut and at Cornell University. He is currently a doctoral candidate in medieval Islamic Art History at the Institute of Fine Arts at New York University. Prior to joining the Institute, he was an architect at the Office for Metropolitan Architecture and Herzog & de Meuron.

His work has been widely exhibited and published. Sigil's work has also been shown around the world including in Venice, Oslo, Annandale-on-Hudson, Beirut, Dubai, Marrakech, and Milan. He has taught at Columbia University's Graduate School of Architecture, Planning and Preservation (GSAPP), and at Columbia University's Columbia Global Center/Studio-X in Amman, where he led the second Janet Abu Lughod seminar, which focused on Qusayr Amra. Malas has also taught on Medieval magic at New York University, Arabic literature at the Cooper Union, and art and design history at the Pratt Institute.

Malas is a member of the Arab Image Foundation's General Assembly.

== Works ==
- The Longest Words: Three Talismans for Conditioning the Air (2024), “And from my heart I blow kisses to the sea and houses”

== Works as Sigil ==
- Excavating the Sky, The 14th International Architecture Exhibition: "Fundamentals: Absorbing Modernity 1914-2014". Directed by Rem Koolhaas, 2014
- Current Power in Syria, The 6th Marrakech International Biennale: "Not New Now". Curated by Reem Fadda, 2016
- Monuments of the Everyday, Oslo arkitekturtriennale: "After Belonging". Curated by After Belonging, 2016
- Monuments of the Everyday, CCS Bard Galleries, Annandale-on-Hudson: "No to the Invasion: From the Archive". Curated by Fawz Kabra and Tarek al-Ariss, 2017
- #therevolutionisamirror, Concrete (Alserkal Avenue), Dubai: "Syria: Into the Light". Curated by Mouna Atassi, 2017.
- Electric Resistance — Monument to a Destroyed Windmill, Sharjah Biennial 13: "Fruits of Sleep" Sursock Museum, Beirut. Curated by Christine Tohme and Reem Fadda, 2017
- Birdsong, XXII Esposizione Internazionale 12: "Broken Nature" La Triennale di Milano, Milan. Curated by Paola Antonelli, 2019

== Selected awards and honors ==
- 2015: 'The Arab Fund for Arts and Culture Visual Arts Grant'
- 2016: 'Distinguished Young Alumni Award of the Architecture & Design Department, Faculty of Engineering and Architecture, American University of Beirut, Awarded in recognition of interdisciplinary creativity and activism.

== Selected writing ==
- 2016: "Monuments of the Everyday" ‘After Belonging: The Objects, Spaces, and Territories of the Ways We Stay in Transit’ by Lluís Alexandre Casanovas Blanco, Ignacio G. Galán, Carlos Mínguez Carrasco, Alejandra Navarrete Llopis, and Marina Otero (eds.)(Zurich: Lars Muller, 2016)
- 2016: "Review: Pattern, Color, Light: Architectural Ornament in the Near East (500–1000)," Journal of the Society of Architectural Historians, Vol. 75 No. 2 (2016): pp. 238–239
- 2017: "The body, writhing in pain, sits before an intoxicated audience" ‘No to the Invasion: Breakdown and Side-effects’ edited by Fawz Kabra (Annandale-on-Hudson: CCS Bard, 2017)
- 2018: A Cenotaph Broken Nature website
