= Giorgio Borruso =

Italian architect

- Occupation: Architect
- Awards: German Design Award (2013), Red Dot: BEST OF THE BEST Design Award (2012), International Architecture Awards and American Architecture Awards (Chicago Athenaeum), AIA/LA Design Awards
- Practice: Giorgio Borruso Design
- Website: http://www.borrusodesign.com

Giorgio Borruso is an Italian architect, known for his designs of international retail fashion houses. Since 2000, Borruso's firm has been based in Venice, Los Angeles, California.

== Career ==
Borruso has attended universities in Italy and Spain. In 2000, he relocated his firm to Venice, Los Angeles, California.

Borruso first received attention in 2001 with the Miss Sixty showroom in South Coast Plaza. His works have received over 170 international design awards. Several of his works are included in museum collections internationally, including the Chicago Athenaeum and the Red Dot Museum in Essen, Germany. Borruso was named Retail Design Luminary in 2006, and Designer of the Year in 2005 by DDI magazine. His recent works include Lord & Taylor in New York, Carlo Pazolini in Milan, New York, Rome, and London, and the Snaidero USA showroom in New York City.

== Selected awards and honors ==
- German Design Prize (Germany 2013)
- Design Practice of the Year - FX Design Awards (UK 2012)
- Red Dot: BEST OF THE BEST Design Award (Germany 2012)
- Retail Design Institute Store Carlo Pazolini in Milan : STORE DESIGN AWARD and INNOVATIVE CONCEPTUAL DESIGN (2011)
- International Architecture Award (Chicago Athenaeum) (2010, 2008)
- GOOD DESIGN Award (2008, 2007, 2006, 2005)
- Red Dot: Product Design Award (Germany 2012 "Best of the Best," 2009, 2008, 2007)
- American Architecture Award (Chicago Athenaeum) (2010, 2007)
- Contract Interiors Award (2010)
- FX International Interior Design Award (UK 2007)
- Interior Design Best of Year Award (2008, 2007)
- LABC Los Angeles Architecture Award (2007)
- IIDA Interior Design Award (2009, 2007)
- AIA/LA Design Award (2011, 2007)
- Future Marketing Award (UK 2006)
- Superior Achievement in Design and Imaging Award (2012, 2006, 2005)
- NASFM Retail Design Award (2005, 'Store of the Year’ 2006)
- Institute of Store Planners/VM+SD International Store Design Award (‘Store of the Year’ 2004, 2005, 2006)
