= Christine Murray =

Canadian architecture writer

Christine Murray is a Canadian-born architecture writer, critic and former editor of The Architectural Review and Architects' Journal, and a contributor to Dezeen and The Guardian. She is founder and editor of The Developer magazine.

Murray was named an honorary fellow of the Royal Institute of British Architects in 2016 for her contribution to architecture and was named an honorary fellow of Royal Incorporation of Architects In Scotland in 2022.

== Biography ==
Christine Murray was born in Oakville, Ontario, Canada. She studied English literature at the University of Toronto and holds an MA in Creative Writing and English Literature from Concordia University in Montreal. Murray relocated to London, England in 2001.

== Career ==
Murray firstly, interned at i-D magazine after winning the Jane Mussett Bursary for aspiring fashion journalists in 2000. Murray later pursued architectural journalism, joining the Architects' Journal in 2007 and was named Editor in 2010.

While at the Architects' Journal, she founded the Women in Architecture Awards which revived the Jane Drew Prize as a career achievement award for women in architecture. Murray presented the prize to the late Zaha Hadid in 2012.

Murray was appointed Editor of the Architectural Review in 2015 and later oversaw both architecture titles as Editor-in-Chief of the Architects' Journal and The Architectural Review from 2016-2018. After her departure in 2018, Murray founded The Developer and the Festival of Place, publishing the first edition of The Developer magazine in March 2019 and hosting the first Festival of Place conference in July at Tobacco Dock in East London.
