= Filipa Ramos =

Portuguese writer, lecturer and curator

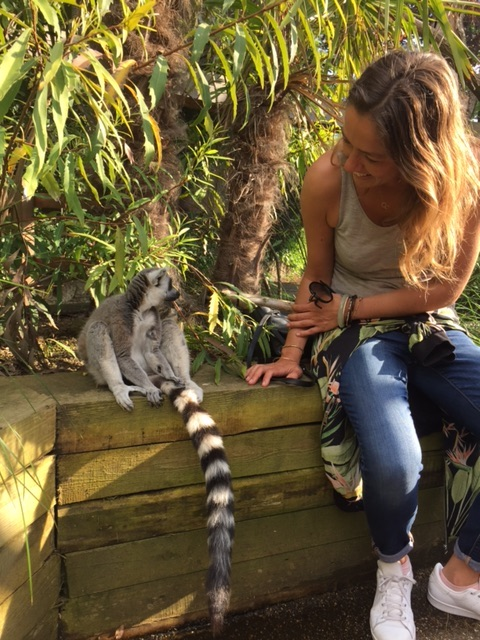
Filipa Ramos with a lemur at the London Zoo, 2018

Filipa Ramos (Lisbon, Portugal) is a writer, lecturer and curator. Her research, manifested in exhibitions, critical and theoretical texts, lectures, workshops and edited publications, focuses on how art addresses ecology, fostering relationships between nature and technology. She advocates a move away from anthropocentric approaches in the arts and humanities.

== Early life and education ==
Ramos was born and grew up in Lisbon, Portugal, the daughter of an architect and a translator. Her father, Paulo Ramos, was one of the founders of the Portuguese punk band Minas e Armadilhas. Ramos studied Art History in Lisbon and Florence and Contemporary Art Theory at Goldsmiths College in London. She received a Doctor of Philosophy (PhD) in Film and Philosophy from the School of Critical Studies at Kingston University, London under the supervision of Professor John Mullarkey.

== Career ==
Ramos is Lecturer at the Bachelor and Master Programme of the Arts Institute of the Academy of Art and Design of the Fachhochschule Nordwestschweiz, Basel, where she leads the Institute's programme of Art Talks and the Art and Nature Master seminars. She is also Artistic Director of Loop Festival, Barcelona, dedicated to supporting and promoting the exhibition and visibility of artists' cinema.

=== Curatorial work ===
Ramos was curator of Art Basel Film (2019-2024) and a founding curator of Vdrome, an online artists’ cinema that she co-founded in 2013 with Editor Edoardo Bonaspetti, Curator Jens Hoffmann and Haus der Kunst's Director Andrea Lissoni. She was Director of the Contemporary Art Department of the city of Porto, including the Galeria Municipal do Porto. Recent projects include the ongoing arts, humanities and science festival The Shape of a Circle in the Mind of a Fish (since 2018) and "Persons Persone Personen", the 8th Biennale Gherdëina (2022), both curated with Lucia Pietroiusti.

In 2024, she curated BESTIARI, the Catalan representation at the 60th Venice Biennale (2024). With Lucia Pietroiusti, with whom she often collaborates, she curated "Songs for the Changing Seasons," 1. Klima Biennale Wien (2024) and "Persons Personen," 8th Biennale Gherdëina (2022). In 2021, she co-curated “Bodies of Water”, the 13th Shanghai Biennale (with Andrés Jaque, Lucia Pietroiusti, Marina Otero Verzier and Mi You), and co-curated the group exhibition “Feet of Clay” at Porto's City Gallery (with Chus Martinez). Previously, she curated the large exhibition project on becoming animal and becoming other, “Animalesque,” at Bildmuseet Umeå, Sweden (Summer 2019) and BALTIC, Gateshead (Winter/Spring 2019/20).

In 2019, she co-curated with John Akomfrah, Guilherme Blanc and Gareth Evans the Forum do Futuro, an annual programme of debates and performances held in Porto, Portugal, whose main objective is to invite guests from different disciplines and cultural backgrounds to discuss key issues facing contemporary societies. The five hundredth anniversary of the first circumnavigation of the world by Fernão de Magalhães inspired the edition. Symbolically adopting the title "Crossings/Travessias", the Fórum do Futuro rethought this journey and its wide-ranging multiple effects at a historical, political, and cultural level. Invited speakers included Chimamanda Ngozi Adichie, Sonia Guajajara, Danny Glover, Christina Sharpe, Elizabeth Povinelli, Vandana Shiva, Coco Fusco, Arthur Jafa, David Adjaye, Fred Moten, Ralph Lemon, Fiesta Warinwa from the African Wildlife Foundation, and others.

In 2020, she also co-curated the Forum do Futuro, this time with Shumon Basar, Jenna Sutela and Guilherme Blanc. Entitled "Vita Nova", the festival answered to the challenges and changes introduced by the COVID-19 pandemic by assuming the shape of a book and inquiring upon the present-future of humanity in a troubled and changing world. Invited contributors included Sophia Al-Maria, K Allado-McDowell Tosh Basco, Rosi Braidotti, Octavia Butler Ted Chiang, GPT-3, Alexis Pauline Gumbs, Joan Jonas, Kirsten Keller, Tabita Rezaire, Denise Ferreira da Silva, Suzanne Treister, Aby Warburg, Chandra Wickramasinghe, Feifei Zhou.

=== Academic and Editorial work ===
Ramos lectures extensively in the fields of contemporary art and ecology. She has extensive experience as an editor and publisher. She was Editor-in-Chief of e-flux criticism (2013–20), Associate Editor of Manifesta Journal (2009–11) and contributed for Documenta 13 (2012) and 14 (2017). She authored Lost and Found (Silvana Editoriale, 2009) and edited Animals (Whitechapel Gallery/MIT Press, 2016). Her most recent book, The Artist as Ecologist, has been published in the UK by Lund Humphries in October 2025, selling out in three weeks. A second edition was published in January 2026.

She co-authored Theater, Garden, Bestiary A Materialist History of Exhibitions ed. by Tristan García and Vincent Normand (Sternberg Press, 2019), The Wild Book of Inventions, ed. by Chus Martinez (Sternberg Press, 2020), Sex Ecologies, ed. by Stefanie Hessler (MIT Press, 2021) and "More-than-Human" (HNI, Serpentine Galleries, 2021). She edited Animals (London: Whitechapel Gallery/MIT Press, 2016), and authored Lost and Found (Milan: Silvana Editoriale, 2009).

Her writing and research on art, film and nature has been published in magazines and catalogues worldwide, such as Afterall, art agenda., Cura, Frieze, Mousse, Nero, Spike, South or The White Review. She has also extensively written for exhibition books catalogues, namely for Amalia Pica's please listen hurry others speak better (2018), Chris Marker's Catalogue Raisonée (2018), Daniel Steegmann Mangrané's Animal That Doesn't Exist, Heman Chong's Abstracts from the Straits Times (2018); Haus der Kulturen der Welt's 2 or 3 Tigers; Allan Sekula's OKEANOS (2017); Elise Florenty & Marcel Türkowsky's One head too many (2017); Insomnia—Sleeplessness as a Cultural Symptom (2016); Archaeology & Exorcisms: Moving Image and the Archive (2016); Emma Smith's Practice of Place (2015); Christian Andersson's Legende (2015); Stadt/Bild — Image of a City (2015); Ursula Mayer's But We Loved Her (2014); Performing the Institution(al), vol. (2011).

== Research threads ==
Interested in the ways in which moving-image-based technologies (film, video) are able of inaugurating and establishing relationship across humans and other animals, her research focuses on the intersection of art history, eco-activisms and film studies, with a particular emphasis on animal presences in artists' cinema. At the same time, she is interested in how the cinema and the zoo look at one another and shape each other as cinematic entities and spaces, which became the topic of "From Zao to Zoo", her PhD thesis. In 2017 she held a public conversation at Tate Modern with Donna Haraway on the occasion of the London film premiere of Fabrizio Terranova's film Storytelling for Earthly Survival (2016). In 2018 she was in conversation with writer and poet Eileen Myles, discussing animals, companionship and loss on occasion of their book Afterglow (A Dog's Memoir). Also in 2018, she and Lucia Pietroiusti were in conversation with anthropologist Anna Lowenhaupt Tsing during "The Shape of a Circle in the Mind of a Fish with Plants" symposium. In 2023, she introduced Claire Pentecost's lecture at Institute Art Gender Nature, Basel.

== The Shape of a Circle in the Mind of a Fish ==
With Serpentine Galleries' Curator of General Ecology, Lucia Pietroiusti, she initiated the symposia project "The Shape of a Circle in the Mind of a Fish". The first symposium, entitled "on language" was held at the London Zoo in May 2018, featuring Diana Reiss, Ted Chiang, Superflex's Rasmus Nielsen and Peter Gabriel. It also featured the performance Sleep Walkers/Zoo Pieces by Simone Forti, interpreted by long-time collaborator Claire Filmon, and the screening of Michela di Mattei's videos.

The second symposium, entitled "we have never been one" took place at Ambika P3/University of Westminster in December 2018, featuring Heather Barnett, site-specific practitioners Gruff Theatre, swarm robotics engineer Sabine Hauert, science historian and writer Daisy Hildyard, neuroscientist Leah Kelly, science sociologist Hannah Landecker, anthropologist Anna Lowenhaupt Tsing, anthropologist Germain Meulemans, biological systems scientist and network architect Phoebe Tickell and artist Anaïs Tondeur plus film and sound works by artists Sophia Al-Maria and Jenna Sutela and composer Annea Lockwood.

The third symposium, entitled "PLANTSEX" took place at Cinema Lumiere of the French Institute in London in April 2019, featuring Melanie Bonajo, Maria Dimitrova, Chloe Aridjis, Dineo Seshee Bopape, Emanuele Coccia, Jenna Sutela, Laurence Totelin, Alex Cecchetti, and Victoria Sin.

The fourth symposium, entitled "The Shape of a Circle in the Mind of a Fish with Plants" took place at EartH Hackney, London, in May 2019. It featured Tabita Rezaire, Hans Ulrich Obrist, Kapwani Kiwanga, Miranda Lowe, Kim Walker, Saelia Aparicio, Carlos Magdalena, Chris Watson, Natasha Myers, Michael Marder, Teresa Castro, Antoine Bertin, Elvia Wilk, Amy Hollywood and Vivian Caccuri.

The fifth symposium, entitled "The Shape of a Circle in the Dream of a Fish" took place at the Natural History Museum in Porto in November 2022. It featured Yussef Agbo-Ola/Olaniyi Studio, Federico Campagna, Nicola S. Clayton, Onome Ekeh, Cru Encarnação, Alex Jordan, Sophie Lunn-Rockliffe, Nahum, Hatis Noit, and Rain Wu and includes a screening of films by artists Mariana Caló and Francisco Queimadela, Rosalind Fowler, Derek Jarman, Dominique Knowles, Ben Rivers and Himali Singh Soin.

The sixth symposium, entitled "Love and Lament," took place at E-Werk Luckenwalde, close to Berlin. Investigating how love and care for a world in change are being affected by a sense of loss and transformation and how the traditional cycles of collapse and renewal are being challenged and interrupted, they invited Aslak Aamot Helm, Antoine Bertin, Kapwani Kiwanga, Michael Ohl, Alejandra Pombo Su, Elizabeth Povinelli, Claudia Rankine, Asad Raza, Giles Round, Jenna Sutela, Jovana Maksic, Staci Bu Shea and Revital Cohen & Tuur Van Balen.

== Personal interests ==
She maintains a keen interest and an advocacy position in supporting the rights and welfare of nonhuman life, expressed in diffusing pro-animal sensibilities concerning the revision of food, fashion and rearing habits and traditions, as well as promoting ethic and humane knowledge advance in animal studies. Accordingly, she advocates for the end of the factory-meat industry, vegetarianism and the revision of the concept of the nuclear family and its reproductive goals. Her politics tend to the left.
