= Salim Al-Kadi =

Salim Al-Kadi (Arabic: سليم القاضي) is an architect and designer from Lebanon. He is a graduate of the American University of Beirut and Columbia University. His bulletproof keffiyeh, first designed in 2016, was widely lauded and was displayed in 2017 at the Museum of Modern Art in New York City, USA.

Along with Khaled Malas, Alfred Tarazi and Jana Traboulsi, he is a co-founder of the Sigil Collective. His architecture office is known as BAO (Beirut Architecture Office).

Kadi is a senior lecturer at the Architecture and Graphic Design department at the American University of Beirut.
