= Wanda Lau =

American writer and architecture critic

Wanda Lau is a writer and architecture critic living in Washington, D.C. She is the editor of technology and practice for Architect Magazine and Architectural Lighting, publications of Hanley Wood Media.

== Education ==
Lau earned her B.S. in civil engineering from Michigan State University. She also holds an S.M. in building technology from MIT, and an M.A. in journalism from Syracuse University's S. I. Newhouse School of Public Communications.

== Criticism and journalism ==
At Architect Magazine, Lau writes and edits technology-driven stories, and oversees the publication's R+D Awards. She is also the occasional host of the publication's podcast. In addition to her work for Architect Magazine, Lau has written for Men's Health, ASID Icon, and University Business.

A selection of her work appears below:

- "AIA Guides for Equitable Practice Offer More Than Workplace Strategies," Architect Magazine, March 1, 2019
- "Podcast: What Is a Smart City? Listen to Three Experts Debate," Architect Magazine, February 14, 2019
- "KieranTimberlake to Launch Roast, an App for Architects to Conduct Post-Occupancy Evaluations," Architectural Lighting, November 1, 2017
- "A Look Behind ESI Design's Interactive Media Wall at Terrell Place," Architectural Lighting, August 1, 2016
