= Catherine Slessor =

Scottish architecture writer, critic, editor

Catherine Slessor MBE
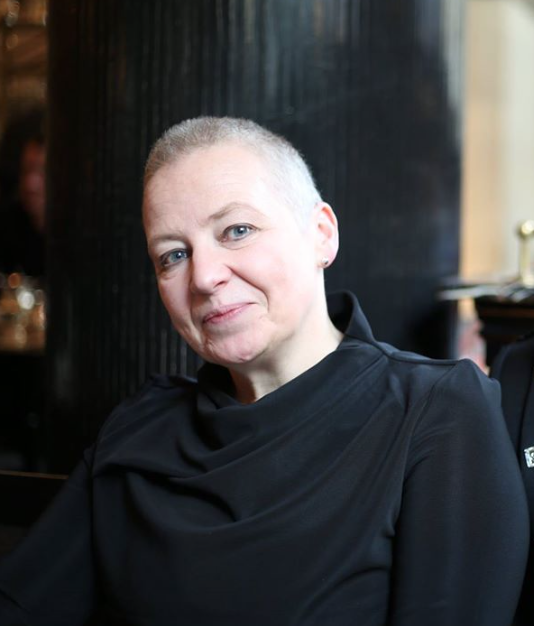
- Slessor in 2016. Photograph taken by Phineas Harper
- Education: University of Edinburgh
- Occupation: Journalist

Catherine Slessor MBE is an architecture writer, critic and former editor of The Architectural Review, and a contributor to the Guardian, Dezeen and Architects' Journal. She received an MBE in 2016 for services to architectural journalism, and in 2021 was elected president of The Twentieth Century Society.

== Biography ==
Slessor was born in Aberdeen, Scotland. She studied architecture at the University of Edinburgh, and holds an MA in Architectural History from the Bartlett School of Architecture, University College London. Slessor started her writing career as a technical editor at Architects' Journal in 1987. She moved to The Architectural Review in 1992, and was its editor for five years from 2009-2015. She was the magazine's first female editor. Her books have been translated into several languages, including Spanish, German, Dutch and Chinese.

== Selected publications ==
- See-through houses inspirational homes and features in glass (2001, Ryland Peters and Small: ISBN 1841722006)
- Eco-tech: sustainable architecture and high technology (1997 (2nd ed. 2001), Thames and Hudson: ISBN 0500341575)
- Contemporary doorways: architectural entrances, transitions and thresholds (1992, Mitchell Beazley: ISBN 1840005092)
- Contemporary staircases (1990, Mitchell Beazley: ISBN 1840003162)
