= Anne Quito =

Design reporter and architecture critic

Anne Quito is a design reporter and architecture critic based in New York City. A former reporter at Quartz, she is also the founding director of Design Lab, the in-house design team for Family Health International (FHI). In 2017, Quito won the inaugural Steven Heller Prize for Cultural Commentary from the American Institute of Graphic Arts (AIGA). In 2018, a story she co-authored received a silver medal in the Malofiej Infographic Awards.

Quito is the writer and editor of Mag Men: Fifty Years of Making Magazines (Columbia University Press, 2019), a book about the glory days of magazine design as told by graphic design legends Milton Glaser and Walter Bernard. In December 2019, she conducted an extended interview with Glaser and Bernard for the book’s launch at the School of Visual Arts in New York City. She is also wrote the book, R/GA by Design: Revolutionizing Film, the Internet, Social and Beyond (Rizzoli, 2026).

She teaches at the ELISAVA Barcelona School of Design and Engineering and is an editor at large of the podcast Print is Dead, (Long Live Print!).

She is the grandniece of philosopher Emerita Quito.

== Education ==
Quito earned her master's degree in visual arts from Georgetown University in 2009. She also earned an MFA in design criticism from the School of Visual Arts in 2014. Quito's master's thesis for the SVA, "Designing a Country from Scratch: Nation Branding in South Sudan," explored the politics of creating a national identity, based on research in Switzerland and South Sudan. She presented her findings at the 2014 Design Criticism conference at the School of Visual Arts, and has lectured and been interviewed about that work.

== Awards and recognition ==
In 2017, Quito won the inaugural Steven Heller Prize for Cultural Commentary from the American Institute of Graphic Arts (AIGA). In 2018 her co-authored story about Emmanuel Macron's portrait received a silver medal in the Malofiej Awards. The award honors young design writers who "best exemplify the tradition of prolific writing and boundless curiosity established by Steven Heller." On the occasion of Quito's win, Steven Heller wrote, "I am very proud to have my name connected to design writing, AIGA and Anne, all in one fell swoop."

She won a first prize award at the 2021 Society for Advancing Business Editing and Writing (SABEW) competition for her investigation into Monotype's acquisition of Hoefler & Co. and the growing monopoly within the font industry. Judges remarked, "The story is illuminating and often funny. Quito’s canny reporting and deft writing won our hearts and minds."

Quito was a commencement speaker at the Parsons School of Design's 2022 graduation ceremonies.

== Criticism and journalism ==
Quito has written for numerous outlets, and has bylines in Quartz, Works That Work, Metropolis, Eye on Design, 99U, Designers and Books, and others.

A selection of her work appears below:

- "WeWork Is Retraining a Generation of Architects to Think in Terms of Data," Metropolis Magazine, February 25, 2019
- "Can This New Alternative to Braille Change the Way Blind People Read?" 99U, April 20, 2018
- "A Guide to Design Book Publishing for the Non-Rich and Non-Famous," 99U, January 16, 2018
- "Return to Maker," Works That Work, No.10
- "Serious Play with Confetti, the World's Most Jubilant Design Studio," Eye On Design, July 16, 2015
- "The 10 Best Architecture and Design Films," Designers and Books, November 21, 2013
- "A Field Guide for the Intrepid Font-Spotter," Designers and Books, October 8, 2013
