= Icon (architecture magazine) =

British design and architecture magazine

ICON
- Cover of issue 216 (Autumn–Winter 2024)
- Editor: Jessica-Christin Hametner
- Categories: Architecture, design, lifestyle
- Frequency: Quarterly
- Publisher: Media 10
- Founder: Daren Newton
- Founded: 2003
- First issue: 1 April 2003
- Company: Media 10
- Country: United Kingdom
- Based in: London
- Language: English
- Website: iconeye.com
- ISSN: 1479-9456

ICON magazine is a British design and architecture magazine established in 2003 by publishing director Daren Newton and founding editor Marcus Fairs, with Art Direction by Violetta Boxhill. After he was fired, Fairs went on to found the online magazine Dezeen in 2006

The current editor is Jessica-Christin Hametner.

The title is owned by Media 10 Ltd. ICON is part of a wider Media 10 publication and event portfolio that includes OnOffice, Clerkenwell Design Week and Design London.

In 2020, the magazine changed from a monthly to a quarterly publication.

== Awards ==
Awards won by the magazine include:

- International Building Press awards: magazine of the year (twice), best architectural journalist and best critic
- Magazine Design Awards: best designed business-to-business magazine, and best use of typography
