= Alexandra Lange =

American architecture writer

- Education: Yale University; New York University Institute of Fine Arts
- Writing career
- Genre: architecture and design criticism
- Notable works: Bloomberg Citylab; Curbed; The Design of Childhood: How the Material World Shapes Independent Kids
- Notable awards: 2025 Pulitzer Prize for Criticism
- Website: alexandralange.net

Alexandra Lange is an American architecture and design critic and author based in New York. She won the 2025 Pulitzer Prize for Criticism, as a contributing writer for Bloomberg Citylab. The author of a series of critically acclaimed books, Lange is the architecture critic for Curbed. She has bylines published in The New Yorker, The New York Times, The Atlantic, Metropolis, Architect magazine, Architectural Digest; Architectural Record, The Architect's Newspaper, Cite; Domus; Domino; Dwell; GOOD; Icon, The Nation, New York magazine, Places Journal, Print and Slate. Lange is a Loeb Fellow, and her work has been recognized through a number of awards, including the 2019 Steven Heller Prize for Cultural Commentary and the Pulitzer Prize for Criticism.

Lange's architectural criticism has a focus on public projects. Her work includes reconceptualising the forms and formats of architectural and design writing and criticism to better engage with the complexities of architectural and design cultures, practices and production, and to write women back into the history of architecture and design.

== Education ==
Lange graduated with a BA in Architecture and Literature from Yale University in 1994. She gained her MA from the Institute of Fine Arts, New York University, in 2001, and her PhD from the same institution in 2005 with the thesis "Tower Typewriter and Trademark: Architects, Designers and the Corporate Utopia, 1956–1964." Lange was a Loeb Fellow at the Graduate School of Design, Harvard University, 2013–2014.

== Awards and recognition ==
Lange's work has been recognized through a number of awards and prizes. In 2020, she was the recipient of the Kliment Oculus Award, awarded to architectural journalists by the American Institute of Architects New York Chapter. (This award is named after Stephen A. Kliment—a former editor-in-chief of Architectural Record.) In 2019, Lange won the Steven Heller Prize for Cultural Commentary from the American Institute of Graphic Arts (AIGA). In 2018, the New York Press Club presented her with an award for feature reporting for her Curbed/Vox Media article, "No Loitering, No Skateboarding, No Baggy Pants."

== Books ==
Lange has published five books to date. The latest, Meet Me by the Fountain: An Inside History of the Mall, was published by Bloomsbury Books in 2022. This work gives a history of development of the mall from its earliest beginnings just after World War II.

The Design of Childhood: How the Material World Shapes Independent Kids, was published by Bloomsbury Books in 2018 to critical acclaim. The book charts the design of the toys, spaces and material culture that shape childhood, and the impact of these. One consequence of the approach has been to reveal the work and careers of many women not traditionally recognised within design and architectural history. The impact of the book has extended through essays published in The New Yorker, The New York Times, Curbed, The Atlantic and other publications.

Writing About Architecture: Mastering the Language of Buildings and Cities was published in 2012 by Chronicle Books.The Dot-Com City: Silicon Valley Urbanism, was published as en e-book by Strelka Institute in 2012.

Design Research: the store that brought modern living to American homes documents the history of Design Research, a store founded by Ben Thompson using the idea of the lifestyle store. Written with Jane Thompson, the book tells the story of Design Research through the voices of the people involved.

Lange has also published a range of chapters in books edited by others. These include:

- “Foreword” in Michelle Millar Fisher and Amber Winick, Designing Motherhood, MIT Press ( 2021).
- “Introduction” in Zach Mortice, Midwest Architecture Journeys, Belt Publishing (2019).
- “Introduction” in Identity: Chermayeff & Geismar & Haviv, Standards Manual (2018).
- “Toys as Furniture / Furniture as Toys,” Serious Play: Design in Midcentury America, New Haven: Yale University Press (2018).
- “Alexander Girard in Columbus,” Alexander Girard: A Designer's Universe, Weil am Rhein: Vitra Design Museum, 2016.
- “Stitching A House,” Listening: Bohlin Cywinski Jackson, Houses 2009 – 2015, New York: Rizzoli, 2015.
- “Preface,” Duke University: An Architectural Tour, New York: Princeton Architectural Press, 2015.
- “2004 – 2008,” Thirty Years of Emerging Voices: Idea, Form, Resonance, New York: Princeton Architectural Press, 2015.
- “The Glamour of Utility,” Formica Forever, New York: Metropolis Books, 2013.
- “’I Can't Live in a Box’: Artists, activism and lower Manhattan in the 1960s,” in New York Cool: Paintings and Sculptures from the NYU Collection, ed. Pepe Karmel, New York: NYU, 2009.
- “Corporate Headquarters: Saarinen in Suburbia,” and with Sean Khorsandi, “Houses and Housing: At Home with Saarinen,” in Eero Saarinen: Shaping the Future, ed. Eeva-Liisa Pelkonen and Donald Albrecht, New Haven: Yale University Press, 2006.

== Criticism and journalism ==
Lange as written criticism for a wide range of publications, predominantly in the United States. Selected articles include the following:

- “A Redux for Marguerita Mergentime,” New York Times, March 2019.
- “Overlooked No More: Julia Morgan, Pioneering Female Architect,” New York Times March 6, 2019.
- "The Hidden Women of Architecture and Design," The New Yorker, June 4, 2018.
- "The End of the Architect Profile," Curbed, April 19, 2018.
- "No loitering, no skateboarding, no baggy pants," Curbed, December 7, 2017.
- "The A-Frame Effect," Curbed, September 22, 2017.
- “A Graphic Novel Turns Teens into City Planners,” The New Yorker, August 19, 2017.
- “Jane Jacobs, Georgia O’Keeffe, and the Power of the Marimekko Dress,” The New Yorker, June 23, 2017.
- “The forgotten history of Japanese-American designers’ internment,” Curbed, January 31, 2017.
- “What It Would Take to Set American Kids Free,” The New Yorker, November 18, 2016.
- “10 Things I Learned at the Vanna Venturi House,” Curbed, November 17, 2016.
- “Jane Jacobs Was No Upstart,” Architect, October 4, 2016.
- "Here Comes Hilda," The New Yorker, June 15, 2016.
- “Play Ground,” The New Yorker, May 16, 2016.
- “A Buffalo Case Study: Can Architecture Bring a City Back?” Curbed, August 6, 2015.
- “Women were unwelcome in architecture, but male architects couldn't live without them,” Dezeen Opinion, May 12, 2015.
- “Pier 55: Pocket Gadget, Meme-tecture, or Something More Nefarious?” Curbed, April 23, 2015.
- “Philip Johnson's Not Glass Houses,” T Magazine, February 15, 2015.
- “Why Charles Moore (Still) Matters,” Metropolis, June 2014.
- “Demolition of Prentice Women's Hospital and Penn Station,” Architect, November 2013.
- “Architecture's Lean-In Moment, on the status of women in architecture,” Metropolis, July/August 2013.
- “Dreams Built and Broken: On Ada Louise Huxtable,” The Nation, May 6, 2013.
- “Founding Mother: Mariana Van Rensselaer and the Rise of Criticism,” Places, February 25, 2013.
- “Fear of Fun: A History of Modernist Design for Children,” Los Angeles Review of Books, October 6, 2012.
