= Pu-239 (film) =

- Theatrical release poster
- Directed by: Scott Z. Burns
- Written by: Scott Z. Burns
- Based on: Pu-239 and Other Russian Fantasies by Ken Kalfus
- Produced by: Charlie Lyons; Miranda de Pencier; Guy J. Louthan
- Starring: Paddy Considine; Radha Mitchell; Oscar Isaac
- Cinematography: Eigil Bryld
- Edited by: Tatiana S. Riegel; Leo Trombetta
- Music by: Abel Korzeniowski
- Distributed by: Beacon Pictures; HBO Films
- Release date: 12 September 2006 (Toronto International Film Festival)
- Running time: 97 minutes
- Country: United Kingdom
- Language: English

Pu-239 (also known as The Half Life of Timofey Berezin) is a 2006 British drama film written and directed by Hollywood producer Scott Z. Burns in his feature directorial debut, which was based on the book Pu-239 and Other Russian Fantasies written by Ken Kalfus. The film was shown twice at the 2006 Toronto International Film Festival under the title The Half Life of Timofey Berezin before being distributed by HBO Films under its original working title. Pu-239 is the chemical symbol for plutonium-239 (^{239}Pu), the most readily fissile isotope of the element plutonium.

== Plot ==
Timofey Berezin (Paddy Considine) works at a former top-secret, badly run and aged nuclear reprocessing facility plant in Skotoprigonyevsk-16, a former closed city and a naukograd. At the film's outset, he is exposed to radioactive contamination while selflessly trying to prevent a critical malfunction. The facility's managers tell him that his exposure was a survivable 100 rems, while accusing him of sabotage and suspending him without pay. Loyal coworkers, however, help Timofey discover the truth that he was exposed to 1,000 rems of radiation. Suffering from acute radiation poisoning, he has only days to live.

Before Timofey's adoring wife, Marina (Radha Mitchell), is fully aware of his fate, he leaves for Moscow, on a mission to secure a better future for her and their young son. He hooks up with a small-time gangster, Shiv (Oscar Isaac), in hopes of finding a buyer for a selfmade canister of a little over 100 grams of weapons-grade plutonium salt he has stolen. It is 1995, only a few years after the dissolution of the Soviet Union, and they spend their time frequenting the hotels, nightclubs and private palaces of the new Moscow underworld, ricocheting between two rival crime lords (Nikolaj Lie Kaas and Steven Berkoff). However, what Timofey and Shiv never realize is that they are both caught in the same dilemma: trying to find a way free of a certain fate; hoping to do right by their loved ones before it is too late.

== Cast ==
- Paddy Considine as Timofey Berezin
- Oscar Isaac as Shiv
- Radha Mitchell as Marina Berezina
- Steven Berkoff as Starkov
- Nikolaj Lie Kaas as Tusk
- Mélanie Thierry as Oxsana
- Jason Flemyng as Vlad

== Awards ==
- Eddie - 2008, Best Edited Miniseries or Motion Picture for Non-Commercial Television
- Excellence in Production Design Award - 2008, Television Movie or Mini-Series

== See also ==
- Radium Girls
- Half-life
