= Peter Blundell Jones =

British architect (1949–2016)

Peter Blundell Jones (4 January 1949 – 19 August 2016) was a British architect and architectural historian. He trained as an architect at the Architectural Association School, and held academic positions at the University of Cambridge and London South Bank University. He was a professor of architecture at the University of Sheffield from 1994 until his death in 2016.

He was a prolific author on architectural history and theory. As well as being a regular contributor to the Architectural Review, he wrote or collaborated on monographs of the work of Erik Gunnar Asplund, Hans Scharoun, Erich Mendelsohn, Hugo Häring and Günter Behnisch.

Jones died on 19 August 2016 at the age of 67.

== Selected bibliography ==
- Blundell Jones, Peter, Gunnar Asplund,( London: Phaidon, 2004)
- Blundell Jones, Peter, Gunter Behnisch, (Basel : Birkhauser, 2000)
- Blundell Jones, Peter, Hans Scharoun: A Monograph, (London: Gordon Fraser Gallery, 1978)
- Blundell Jones, Peter, Hans Scharoun, (London : Phaidon, 1995)
- Blundell Jones, Peter, Hugo Haring: The Organic Versus the Geometric, (Stuttgart; London: Edition Axel Menges, 1999)
- Blundell Jones, Peter, Modern Architecture Through Case Studies, (Oxford: Architectural, 2002) According to WorldCat, the book is held in 205 libraries
- Blundell Jones, Peter, Marl Revisit, in Marl. Industriestadt eigener Art: Neuer Aufbruch mit Natur und Kultur. Klartext, Essen 2014, ed. Hartmut Dreier, Manfred Walz, Roland Günter ISBN 3837513653 pp. 101–113, with illustrations (originally The Architectural Review, 2012)

Besides his writing, he also left some buildings, such as The Round House at Stoke Canon, Devon, which he designed for his parents, and the refurbished Padley Mill, Grindleford, Derbyshire. These show their pedigree in the more human side of modernism.

Peter, the second of three children, was born near Exeter, where his father, Geoffrey, was an orthopaedic surgeon, and his mother, Avis (née Dyer), a GP. He attended an Exeter preparatory school and Blundell's school, Tiverton.

After he left the AA in 1972, he was commissioned to write the book on Scharoun. He then designed and built The Round House and taught for a year at the North London Polytechnic and the University of Bath, whilst also writing for the Architectural Review and Architectural Journal.

Peter was an assistant lecturer at Cambridge University (1979–83) and from 1988 a principal lecturer and then reader at the South London Polytechnic. In 1992 he was named architectural journalist of the year. In 1994 he was appointed professor at the University of Sheffield School of Architecture.
