= Marcus Fairs =

British editor (1967–2022)

- Born: 1967
- Died: 2022 (aged 54–55)
- Occupation: Editor
- Organization: Dezeen
- Awards: Honorary Fellowship of the Royal Institute of British Architects

Marcus Fairs (27 November 1967 – 30 June 2022) was a British editor. He was the founder and editor of the online design magazine Dezeen and the founding editor of the British architecture and design magazine Icon.
