= Rosemarie Haag Bletter =

American art historian

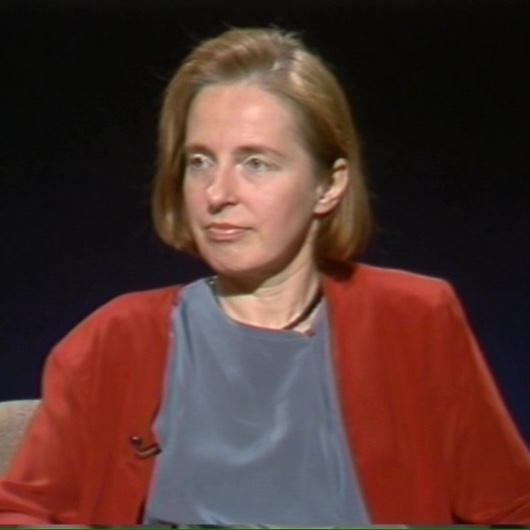
- Bletter on CUNY TV's Cinema Then, Cinema Now (1987)
- Born: Rosemarie Haag; February 27, 1939 (age 87); Heilbronn, Germany
- Education: Columbia University
- Occupation: Architectural historian
- Spouses: Robert Bletter (1964–1976); Martin Filler (m. 1978–present)

Rosemarie Haag Bletter is a German-born American architectural historian, university professor, writer, and lecturer.

== Education ==
Bletter was educated at Columbia University, where she received her BS, MA, and PhD. She completed a master’s thesis on the Catalan Modernista architect Josep Vilaseca and a doctoral dissertation on the work of Bruno Taut and Paul Scheerbart.

== Academic career ==
Bletter has taught at Yale, Columbia, the Institute of Fine Arts, New York University, and CUNY Graduate Center. She supervised twenty-five doctoral dissertations, among them those of the scholars Barry Bergdoll, Larry Busbea, and Gabrielle Esperdy. An expert on twentieth-century European and American architecture, she was instrumental in the favorable reappraisal of Art Deco building design during the 1970s, is particularly known for her seminal writings on German Expressionist and Early Modernist architecture, as well as for her cultural analysis of the architecture of Robert Venturi and Denise Scott Brown, and as an early exponent in academia of Frank Gehry's work.

== Curatorial ==
Bletter was an organizer of the 1975 Brooklyn Museum exhibition "Skyscraper Style" (co-sponsored by the Architectural League of New York). It was based on her book of the same name (with the photographer Cervin Robinson), one of the first serious studies to validate American Art Deco commercial architecture. With Martin Filler, among others, she was a guest curator of the 1985 Whitney Museum of American Art exhibition "High Styles: Twentieth Century American Design." Bletter and Filler wrote and conducted the interviews for three documentary films produced by Michael Blackwood Productions: Beyond Utopia: Changing Attitudes in American Architecture (1983), Arata Isozaki: Early Work in Japan (1985), and Stirling (1987). She also served on the advisory panel and as an essayist for the Denver Art Museum’s 2001-2004 traveling exhibition "US Design: 1975-2000."

== Publications ==
Books

- Bletter, Rosemarie Haag; Robinson, Cervin (1975). Skyscraper Style: Art Deco New York. New York: Oxford University Press. ISBN 9780195018738.
- Bletter, Rosemarie Haag (1977). El Arquitecto Josep Vilaseca i Casanovas: Sus Obras y Dibujos. Barcelona: Colegio de Arquitectos de Cataluña.
- Bletter, Rosemarie Haag, ed. (1996). Adolf Behne: The Modern Functional Building. Los Angeles: Getty Research Institute for the History of Art and the Humanities. ISBN 9780892363643.
- Bletter, Rosemarie Haag; Ockman, Joan, eds. (2014). The Modern Architecture Symposia, 1962-1966. New York, New Haven: Buell Center/Yale University Press. ISBN 9780300209952.

Articles

- Bletter, Rosemarie Haag (March 1981). "The Interpretation of the Glass Dream: Expressionist Architecture and the History of the Crystal Metaphor". Journal of the Society of Architectural Historians. 40 (1): 20–43. doi:10.2307/989612. JSTOR 989612.
- Bletter, Rosemarie Haag (Summer 1983). "Expressionism and the New Objectivity". Art Journal. 43 (2): 108–120. doi:10.1080/00043249.1983.10792213.
- Bletter, Rosemarie Haag (1984). "Transformations of the American Vernacular". Venturi, Rauch & Scott Brown: A Generation of Architecture. Champaign-Urbana, University of Illinois: Krannert Art Museum.
- Bletter, Rosemarie Haag (1985). "Frank Gehry's Spatial Reconstructions". The Architecture of Frank Gehry. Minneapolis: Walker Art Center.
- Bletter, Rosemarie Haag (1985). "The World of Tomorrow: The Future with a Past". High Styles: Twentieth-Century American Design. New York: Whitney Museum of Art.
- Bletter, Rosemarie Haag (February 1987). "Invention of the Skyscraper: Notes on Its Diverse Histories". Assemblage (2): 110–117. doi:10.2307/3171092. JSTOR 3171092.
- Bletter, Rosemarie Haag (1995). Kardon, Janet (ed.). Myths of Modernism. New York: Harry N Abrams. ISBN 978-0810919686.
- Bletter, Rosemarie Haag (2001). "Mies and Dark Transparency". Mies in Berlin. New York: Museum of Modern Art.
