= Ken Kalfus =

American journalist

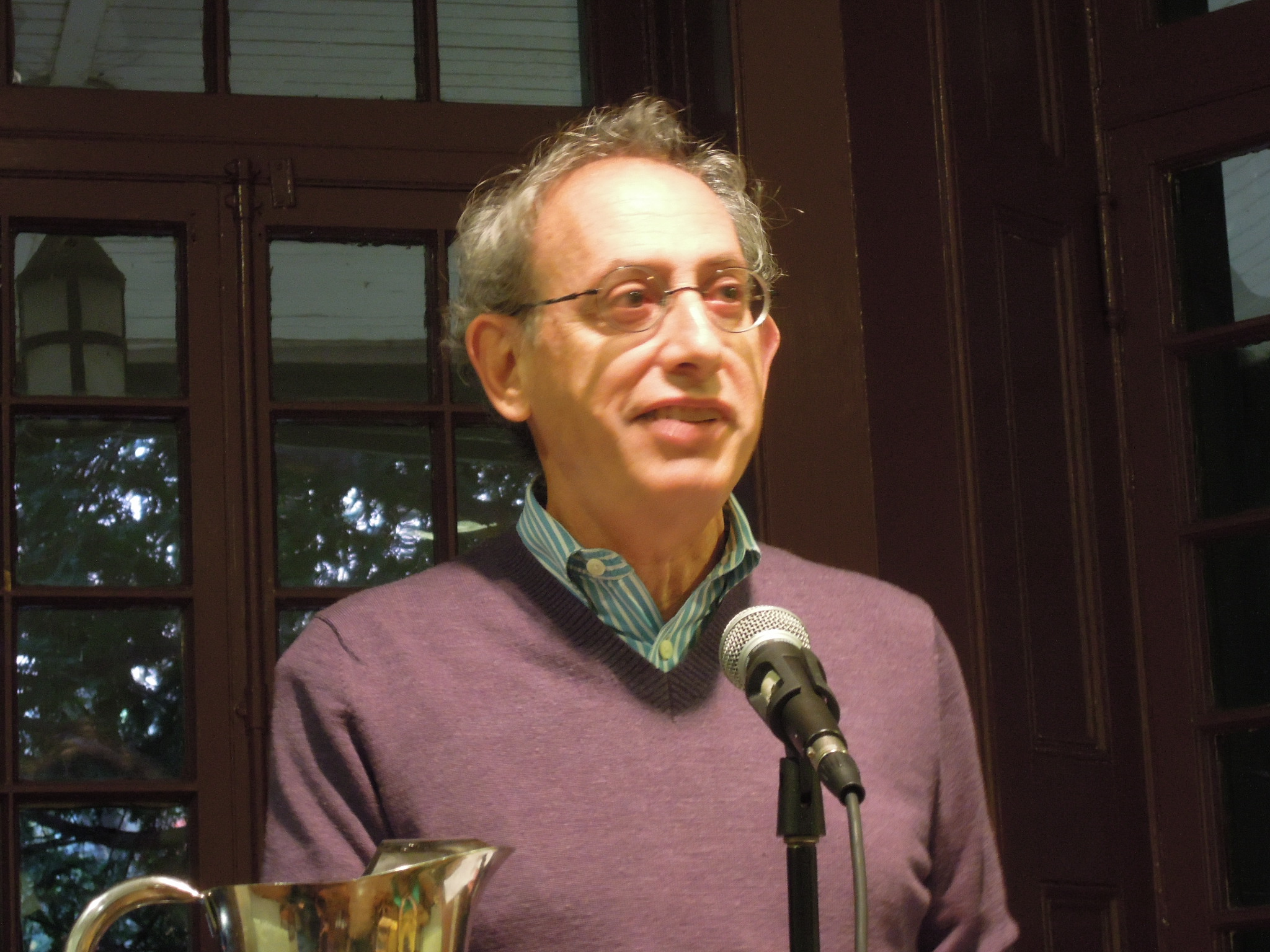
- Kalfus in October 2013
- Born: April 9, 1954 (age 72); New York City, U.S.
- Education: Sarah Lawrence College; The New School for Social Research; New York University
- Occupations: Author; journalist
- Spouse: Inga Saffron
- Children: 1

Ken Kalfus (born April 9, 1954, in New York City) is an American author and journalist. Three of his books have been named New York Times Notable Books of the Year.

== Early life and education ==
He was born in the Bronx, and grew up in Plainview, Long Island.

Kalfus started college at Sarah Lawrence College, but dropped out after the first year. Kalfus later attended the New School for Social Research in Manhattan and New York University. Kalfus started writing at an early age.

== Career ==
Kalfus and his family have lived in Paris, Dublin, Belgrade, and Moscow. He believes his time in other countries keeps his observations fresh and provides him with valuable insights.

Kalfus began his career by publishing short stories and now writes novels. His most recent novel was 2 A.M. in Little America (2023). His previous novel, A Disorder Peculiar to the Country (2006), was a National Book Award nominee. His first novel was The Commissariat of Enlightenment (2003), preceded by short story collections PU-239 and Other Russian Fantasies (1999) and Thirst (1998). The latter three works were each chosen among The New York Times Notable Books of the Year. He published his first book at the age of 44, and achieved favorable critical response.

His story collection Coup de Foudre was published in 2015. The title story is a novella, a thinly veiled fictionalization of Dominique Strauss-Kahn's alleged 2011 sexual assault on a maid in a midtown New York hotel suite. In an interview in Bookslut, he told the critic Vladislav Davidzon "The news often feeds my imagination, which is why my fiction sometimes plays off topical or historical events...."

The 2007 HBO movie Pu-239 was based on his short story of the same name.

== Marriage and family ==
He is married to Inga Saffron, Pulitzer-winning architecture critic for The Philadelphia Inquirer, with whom he has a daughter, Sky.

== Books ==
- Pu-239 and Other Russian Fantasies. 1999. ISBN 978-1-57131-029-3.
- The Commissariat of Enlightenment. Ecco. 2003. ISBN 978-0-06-050136-5.
- A Disorder Peculiar to the Country. Harper Collins. 2006. ISBN 978-0-06-050140-2.
- Thirst. 2010. ISBN 978-1-57131-081-1.
- Equilateral. Bloomsbury Publishing USA. 2013. ISBN 978-1-62040-006-7.
- Coup de Foudre. Bloomsbury Publishing USA. 2015. ISBN 978-1-62040-085-2.
- 2 A.M. in Little America. Milkweed Editions. 2022. ISBN 978-1-57131-144-3.

== Honors ==
- Finalist for PEN/Faulkner Award
- Salon Book Award
- Pushcart Prize
- 2009 Guggenheim Fellowship
- 2009 Pew Fellowships in the Arts
