= Phineas Harper =

British writer, curator and sculptor

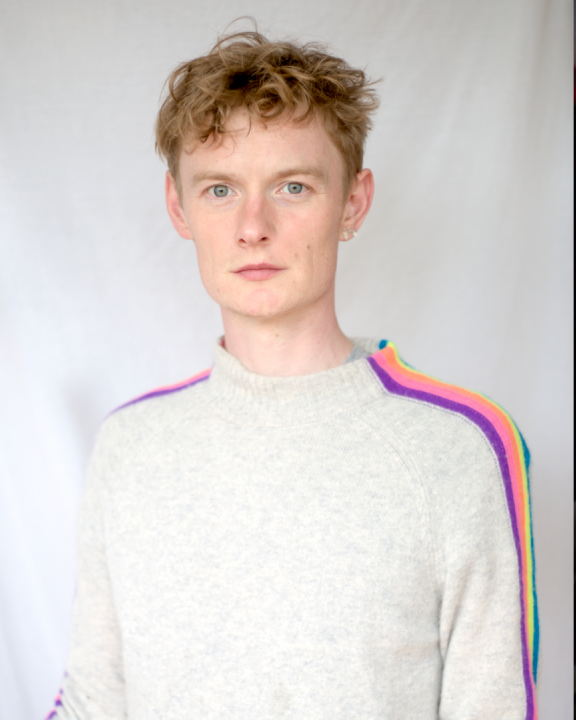
- Education: Welsh School of Architecture
- Occupations: Writer, curator and sculptor
- Website: www.phineasharper.com

Phineas Harper is a British writer, curator and sculptor. They are a regular opinion writer for The Guardian and were previously chief executive of Open City, Deputy Director of the Architecture Foundation, Chief Curator of the Oslo arkitekturtriennale and Deputy Editor of the Architectural Review. They currently serve as a trustee of The 20th Century Society. In 2022 they were awarded an honorary fellowship of the Royal Institute of British Architects.
