= Rowan Moore =

British architecture critic and journalist

Rowan William Gillachrist Moore (born 22 March 1961) is an architecture critic.

== Biography ==
Moore was born on 22 March 1961. His brother is the journalist, newspaper editor and Margaret Thatcher's official biographer Charles Moore, Baron Moore of Etchingham, and his grandfather was the second Baronet Moore, Sir Alan Hilary Moore.

Rowan Moore's parents were Ann (née Miles), who was a county councillor for the Liberal Party in Sussex, and Richard Moore, who was a leader writer for the national newspaper the News Chronicle and political secretary to the leader of the Liberal Party. He unsuccessfully stood for a seat as a Liberal MP at several general elections.

Moore was educated at Westminster School and St John's College, Cambridge, where he studied architecture. After briefly practising, he turned to journalism. He was editor of the architecture journal Blueprint, architecture editor of the Evening Standard and also wrote for The Guardian.

In 2002 Moore succeeded Lucy Musgrave as director of the Architecture Foundation and resigned in 2008 amid speculation that the failure of a commission for Zaha Hadid to design new headquarters for the institution had left "everyone disappointed and angry".

Thereafter Moore concentrated on journalism and was appointed to the post of architecture critic of The Observer in February 2010. He was named critic of the year at the 2014 British Press Awards. Following the 2024 All-Ireland Senior Hurling Championship final, Moore wrote in praise of hurling, though also suggested it was "unexportable" and, were this not so, then it would be "a global sport".

Rowan Moore married Molly Mulready, an immigration and asylum judge, and the daughter of Sally Mulready, at St Paul's Cathedral in London on 3 February 2024.

== Selected works ==
- Panoramas of London (1993)
- Struktur, Raum Und Haut (1995)
- The New Art Gallery Walsall (2000)
- Building Tate Modern: Herzog & De Meuron (2000)
- Why We Build (2012)
- Anatomy of a Building (2014)
- Slow Burn City: London in the Twenty-First Century (2016)
- Property: The myth that built the world (2023)
