= Michael Kimmelman =

American art and architecture critic

- Born: May 8, 1958 (age 68); New York City, US
- Education: Yale University, Harvard University
- Occupations: Critic, columnist, pianist
- Spouse: Maria Simson (m. 1988)

Michael Kimmelman (born May 8, 1958) is the architecture critic for The New York Times and has written about public housing and homelessness, public space, landscape architecture, community development and equity, infrastructure and urban design. He has reported from more than 40 countries and twice been a Pulitzer Prize finalist, most recently in 2018 for his series on climate change and global cities. In March 2014, he was awarded the Brendan Gill Prize for his "insightful candor and continuous scrutiny of New York's architectural environment" that is "journalism at its finest." He is also a professional classical music pianist.

== Early life and education ==
Kimmelman was born and raised in Greenwich Village, the son of a physician and a sculptor, both civil rights activists.

Kimmelman attended PS 41 and Friends Seminary in Manhattan. He graduated summa cum laude from Yale College with the Alice Derby Lang prize in classics and a degree in history, and received his graduate degree in art history from Harvard University, where he was an Arthur Kingsley Porter Fellow.

== Career ==
Kimmelman served as The New York Times longtime chief art critic. In 2007, Kimmelman created the Abroad column, as a foreign correspondent covering culture, political and social affairs across Europe and elsewhere. Based in Berlin, he covered the crackdown on cultural freedom in Vladimir Putin's Russia, life in Gaza under Hamas, the rise of the far-right in Hungary and Négritude in France, among other topics.

Kimmelman returned to New York from Europe in Autumn 2011 to become the paper's architecture critic. His articles since then, on Hudson Yards, Penn Station, sound, climate change, the New York Public Library, the World Trade Center, transit and infrastructure, redevelopment after Hurricane Sandy, as well as on Notre-Dame cathedral in Paris, Syrian refugee camps as do-it-yourself cities, cultural identity in Baghdad and public space and protest in Turkey, Rio and post-revolutionary Cairo, among other issues at home and overseas, have helped to reshape policy and the public debate about urbanism, architecture and architectural criticism. New York Magazine titled an article in 2013 about him "The People's Critic".

As a pianist, Kimmelman has performed as a soloist and with chamber groups in concert series in New York and around Europe. Early in his career, he was an editor at I.D. magazine and architecture critic for New England Monthly. Author of Portraits, The Accidental Masterpiece and The Intimate City, he has hosted various television features.

A finalist for the Pulitzer Prize in 2000 and 2014 Franke Visiting Fellow at The Whitney Humanities Center at Yale, where he had also been a Poynter Fellow, Kimmelman has received honorary doctorates from the Corcoran School of the Arts and Design in 2013 and the Pratt Institute in May 2014.

In 2018, the climate series authored by Kimmelman with visuals by Josh Haner in The New York Times won an award from the Society of Publishers in Asia (SOPA) for "two superb articles on the environmental threats facing two Asian cities" that was "journalism par excellence."

Kimmelman is an adjunct professor on the faculty of the Columbia Graduate School of Architecture, Planning and Preservation. He has delivered the Robert B. Silvers Lecture at the New York Public Library, and contributed regularly to The New York Review of Books.

In November 2020, Kimmelman gave the Raoul Wallenberg Lecture at the University of Michigan. In May 2023, he delivered the Frizzell Lecture at the University of Chicago and the commencement address for the Weitzman School at the University of Pennsylvania.

Kimmelman was the founder and editor-at-large of a philanthropically supported journalism initiative at The New York Times called Headway which focused on global challenges and paths toward progress. In 2026 he was appointed Visiting Senior Fellow at the London School of Economics.

== Personal life ==
In 1988, he married the writer and editor Maria Simson.

== Books ==
- Studies in Modern Art: The Museum of Modern Art at Mid-Century (Harry N. Abrams, 1994)
- Portraits: Talking with Artists at the Met, the Modern, the Louvre, and Elsewhere (Random House, 1998)
- The Accidental Masterpiece: On the Art of Life and Vice Versa (Penguin Press, 2005)
- Oscar Niemeyer (Assouline, 2009)
- More Things Like This (McSweeney's/Chronicle Books, 2009)
- Playing Piano for Pleasure by Charles Cooke, foreword by Michael Kimmelman (Skyhorse, 2011)
- Beyond Zuccotti Park: Freedom of Assembly and the Occupation of Public Space (New Village Press, 2012)
- The Olympic City photographs by Jon Pack and Gary Hustwit, foreword by Michael Kimmelman (2013)
- Shigeru Ban: Humanitarian Architecture, essay by Michael Kimmelman (Aspen Art Press and D.A.P., 2014)
- City Squares: Eighteen Writers on the Spirit and Significance of Squares Around the World, introduction by Michael Kimmelman (HarperCollins, 2016)
- The Intimate City: Walking New York (Penguin Press, 2022)
