= Oslo arkitekturtriennale =

Architecture festival in Oslo, Norway

Oslo Architecture Triennale (OAT) is an international architecture festival and arena for exploration, development and dissemination of architecture and urban development. The festival is held in Oslo, Norway once every three years. It was launched by the Association of Norwegian Architects (Norske arkitekters landsforbund) in year 2000.

The main target groups of OAT include the citizens and users of the city, decision makers, professionals and international guests.

== Administration ==
The OAT Secretariat is located at the Oslo School of Architecture and Design (AHO). Christian Pagh is the Director of the Triennale.

=== Association: ===
OAT is a non-profit association with Members and Associated Members.

=== Board: ===
The board of OAT comprises representatives from the Association's Members: Erling Dokk Holm (chair), Ole Gustavsen (Oslo School of Architecture and Design), Siri Jæger Brudvik (Oslo Association of Architects), Kari Bucher (National Association of Norwegian Architects), Tor Inge Hjemdal (Design and Architecture Norway), Martin Braathen (National Museum) and Siw Andersen (Oslo Business Region).

== Associated Members ==
The Association of Consulting Architects in Norway,, FutureBuilt , the Norwegian Organization of Interior Architects and Furniture Designers (NIL) , the Norwegian Association of Landscape Architects (NLA)(), the Norwegian University of Science and Technology (NTNU), ROM for Art & Architecture , Municipality of Oslo, Department of Urban Development.

== Themes ==
=== 2007: The Culture of Risk ===
"The Culture of Risk" aimed to contribute to focusing attention on our potential for new thinking, both with regards to what Norway as a nation represents and what we can become. Curated by Spacegroup with Gary Bates and Alexandra Cruz

=== 2010: Man Made ===
The 4th edition of the Oslo Architecture Triennale, MAN MADE, focused on innovative and futureproof spatial policies for architecture and urban development, looking and thinking ahead to meet the rising global demand for a more sustainable life. Curated by Code Architecture with Bjarne Ringstad

=== 2013: Behind the Green Door - Architecture and the desire for Sustainability ===
“Behind the Green Door – Architecture and the desire for sustainability” examined sustainability's extensive impact and influence on architecture and city planning the last 30 years. It was curated by Rotor (architecture)

=== 2016: After Belonging ===
“After Belonging” examined both our attachment to places and collectivities—Where do we belong?—as well as our relation to the objects we own, share, and exchange—How do we manage our belongings. Curated by After Belonging Agency with Lluís Alexandre Casanovas Blanco, Ignacio González Galán, Carlos Mínguez Carrasco, Alejandra Navarrete Llopis and Marina Otero Verzier.

=== 2019: Enough: The Architecture of Degrowth ===
Enough: The Architecture of Degrowth was the 2019 version of the triennale, curated by Interrobang with Maria Smith, Matthew Dalziel, Cecilie Sachs Olsen and Phineas Harper.

=== 2022: Mission Neighbourhood – (Re)forming communities ===
In a time when the world is facing major social and environmental challenges, Oslo Architecture Triennale 2022 spotlights neighbourhood as a place and horizon for rethinking our cities. With the working title Mission Neighbourhood – (Re)forming communities, the Triennale will explore how we form the places we share.

== History ==
2000: OAT was established by the National Association of Norwegian in year 2000.

2006: The frequency was shifted and the triennial was postponed to 2007. NAL had a new country governor, who needed more time to organize such a large and comprehensive event with the professional high quality they wanted. The country governors are elected for three years at a time. This shift also gave rise to more time for preparation for the next conference.

2015: Since 2015, the Association has been extended to include seven Associated Members from the field of architecture and urban development.

== Bibliography ==
There are published both catalogs and books about the triennials.

- Lars Müller Publishers (2016). After Belonging: The Objects, Spaces, and Territories of the Ways We Stay in Transit (English). Oslo: Oslo architecture Triennale. ISBN 978-3037785201
- Rotor (2013). Behind the green door: a critical look at sustainable architecture through 600 objects (English). Oslo: Oslo Architecture Triennale. ISBN 978-82-999370-1-6.
- Berg, Helle B., Nina Nielsen, Morten Gottschalk; Rotor (2013). Behind the green door: architecture and the desire for sustainability (English). Oslo: OAT. ISBN 9788299937009.
- Jorem, Kaja Tvedten, red. (2013). Bak den grønne døren: arkitektur og drømmen om bærekraft: rapport Oslo arkitekturtriennale 2013 (Norwegian). Oslo: Oslo arkitekturtriennale.
- Brudvik, Siri Jæger og Joakim Skajaa, red. (2013). Here and there and in and out and – (Norwegian and English). Oslo: Oslo arkitektforening.
- Several authors (2013). sustaineble?. Arkitektur N (Norwegian and English) Oslo: Norske arkitekters landsforbund. pamphlet.
- Berg, Helle Benedicte (2013). Oslo: OAT. ISBN 978-82-999370-0-9.
- Oslo arkitekturtriennale (2013). Custom Made: naturalizing tradition. Oslo: Arkitektur- og designhøgskolen in Oslo. [Poster and catalog for the exhibition in the Gallery, AHO]
- Several authors (2010). Oslo arkitekturtriennale 2010; Amateur Architecture Studio; Decolonizing architecture; Ecosistema urbano. Arkitektur N. Oslo: Norske arkitekters landsforbund. pamphlet
- Ringstad, Bjarne (2010). Man made»: politikk og arkitektur: hva mener du?. Oslo: OT10. Catalog.
- N.N. (2001). 100 000 boliger: Arkitekturtriennalen 2000: Bjørvika. Byggekunst. Oslo: Norsk arkitekturforlag (4). pamphlet
- Lending, Mari (red.) (2000). Arkitekturtriennale Oslo #1 2000: ways of living (Norwegian and English) Oslo: Norske arkitekters landsforbund.
