= Martin Filler =

American writer

- Born: Martin Myles Filler; September 17, 1948 (age 77); Colorado Springs, Colorado
- Education: Columbia College, Columbia University's Department of Art History and Archaeology
- Occupation: Architecture critic
- Notable credit(s): The New York Times, The New York Review of Books, The New Republic, Vanity Fair, House & Garden, Progressive Architecture and Architectural Record

Martin Myles Filler (born September 17, 1948) is an American architecture critic. He is best known for his long essays on modern architecture that have appeared in The New York Review of Books since 1985, and which served as the basis for his 2007 book Makers of Modern Architecture, published by New York Review Books.

== Education ==
Born in Colorado Springs, Colorado, Filler received a BA in art history from Columbia College in 1970 and an MA from Columbia University's department of art history and archaeology in 1972.

== Career ==
Filler began his career in 1973 at Columbia University's Teachers College Press. From 1974 to 1977 he was the editor of Architectural Record Books at McGraw-Hill, where he produced anthologies of writings by Frank Lloyd Wright and Lewis Mumford. He began contributing book reviews to Architectural Record magazine in 1974, and three years later became an associate editor at Progressive Architecture. In 1979 Filler started his long association with Condé Nast Publications, where he was an editor of House & Garden until the magazine ceased publication in 2007. From 1990 to 1994 he was also a contributing editor at Vanity Fair, where he wrote profiles on major figures in the arts including Lucian Freud, Roy Lichtenstein, Paul Mellon, I.M. Pei, Irving Penn, and Jacob Rothschild. From 1999 to 2003 he was the architecture critic for The New Republic, and in that latter year was elected a fellow of the American Academy of Arts and Sciences.

== Writing ==
His writings on architecture, art, and design–more than 1,000 articles to date–have appeared in a broad range of periodicals, newspapers, scholarly journals, and exhibition catalogues in the United States, Europe, and Japan, including some 50 pieces for The New York Times. During the early 1980s, Art in America ran his eleven-part series on an emerging generation of avant-garde architects including Frank Gehry and others yet to achieve widespread recognition.

=== Publications ===
His 2007 book Makers of Modern Architecture was published by New York Review Books and Spanish-language edition, La arquitectura moderna y sus creadores, will be published by Alba in October 2012. Robert Hughes praised it as "by far the most intelligent and shapely writing on architecture done in recent years," and called Filler the "one regular critic in the American press whose pieces are a guaranteed pleasure to revisit–or to read for the first time."

A second collection of his New York Review essays, Makers of Modern Architecture, Volume II, was published by New York Review Books in the fall of 2013. According to the historian George Baird, "In the wake of a significant shift in the tenor or architectural criticism . . . [Filler] can claim to have launched the new tone, and a new social orientation to architectural design . . . The strength of Filler's writing has steadily grown over time and . . . [i]t seems to me that he can now lay claim to the mantel of the late Ada Louise Huxtable, the most admired critic of recent times."

The series was further extended with the publication of Makers of Modern Architecture, Volume III in the fall of 2018.

Filler's criticism is often acerbic and outspoken: in a New York Times Op-Ed Page piece he denounced the Gwathmey Siegel addition to Frank Lloyd Wright's Guggenheim Museum as "the most appalling act of architectural vandalism since the demolition of Pennsylvania Station". In The New York Review of Books he termed the rebuilding of post-reunification Berlin "a fiasco of immense proportions, the greatest lost opportunity in postwar urbanism," and characterized the bird-like structures of the Spanish architect-engineer Santiago Calatrava as "kitsch."

=== Rem Koolhaas correction ===
Filler's May 10, 2012 profile of Rem Koolhaas in The New York Review of Books attracted the architect's attention for its factual errors based on what Filler found on Wikipedia. When Koolhaas wrote the NYRB to correct the errors, Filler responded by blaming Koolhaas for not correcting his own Wikipedia page (those errors were corrected in the revised version of the Koolhaas essay that appears as Chapter 13 in Makers of Modern Architecture, Volume II).

=== Zaha Hadid correction ===
From August 2014 until January 2015 he was the subject of a lawsuit by Zaha Hadid for erroneous comments he made in The New York Review of Books. Within days of the legal action, Filler issued a public statement stating, in part, “I wrote that an 'estimated one thousand laborers...have perished while constructing her project thus far' ...[when in fact] there have been no worker deaths on the Al Wakrah project.” He added that "I regret the error." In early 2015 Hadid withdrew her complaint and under the terms of a confidential settlement agreement donated "an undisclosed sum of money to a charitable organization that protects and champions labor rights."

== Other endeavors ==
Filler served as a guest curator for the Whitney Museum of Art's exhibition High Styles: Twentieth Century American Design (1984) and the Brooklyn Museum's exhibition Vital Forms: American Art and Design in the Atomic Age, 1940-1960 (2001).

== Views ==
=== MoMa Expansion ===
Filler's May 23, 2013 article denouncing the Museum of Modern Art's intention to demolish Tod Williams and Billie Tsien's adjacent American Folk Art Museum building to make way for MoMA's further expansion has been widely credited with prompting the institution to reconsider its plans. As Baird noted, "It is hard to imagine that Filler's voice did not have a significant effect on the situation."

== Personal life ==
In 1978 he married the architectural historian Rosemarie Haag Bletter, with whom he collaborated on the Whitney show. Together they wrote and conducted interviews for three documentary films by Michael Blackwood: Beyond Utopia: Changing Attitudes in American Architecture (1983), Arata Isozaki (1985), and James Stirling (1987).

== Awards and honors ==
- 2003 Elected Fellow of the American Academy of Arts and Sciences
- 2014 PEN/Diamonstein-Spielvogel Award for the Art of the Essay, Longlist, for Makers of Modern Architecture, Volume II
- 2017 Stephen A. Kliment Oculus Award in Architectural Journalism, awarded by the American Institute of Architects New York Chapter, to honor a media professional for his/her "influence on the practice of architecture and on helping those in the architectural profession by promoting and elevating its standards."
