= Nancy Levinson =

American editor

Nancy Levinson is an editor and writer working at the intersection of journalism, scholarship, architecture, and urbanism. She has been the editor and executive director of Places journal since 2008. She was the Founding Director of the Phoenix Urban Research Lab at The Design School at Arizona State University, and a founding editor of Harvard Design Magazine at the Harvard Graduate School of Design.

== Education ==
Levinson gained her BA from Yale University and her Master of Architecture from the University of Pennsylvania.

== Career ==
Levinson began her career with a short period in architectural practice before moving into architectural journalism. She has published in a wide range of media, both professional and scholarly, including the Journal of Planning Literature, Yale Journal of Architecture, I.D., Metropolis, Landscape Architecture, The Christian Science Monitor, and Architectural Record, for which she was a contributing editor. She has also edited books for the Princeton Architectural Press and contributed chapters to Architecture and Film, edited by Mark Lamster, and Judging Architectural Value. Levinson also spent a period as ‘editor in the archives’ at the Canadian Centre for Architecture.

In 1997 Levinson co-founded Harvard Design Magazine, the biannual publication of the Harvard University Graduate School of Design, with William Saunders, and continued co-editing the publication until 2001. Issues she directed and edited addressed a wide range of topics, including metropolitan form, monuments, spectacle culture, and post-communist Eastern Europe. From September 2004 until November 2006 Levinson wrote Pixel Points for the Arts Journal, an early manifestation of architectural blogging.

Levinson became the founding director of the Phoenix Urban Research Lab and Professor of Practice at the Design School at Arizona State University in 2007. She was appointed editor of Places Journal in 2008, replacing long-time editor Donlyn Lyndon, and maintained both roles until she was appointed full-time at Places.

Levinson also contributes to architectural culture as a design juror and public speaker.

== Editorial practice ==
Levinson focuses on the opportunities presented by digital and online media for reaching new audiences and expanding the impact of scholarly work. Under Levinson’s editorship, Places moved from print to online and built a substantial and wide-ranging interdisciplinary readership. Levinson has expanded the mandate of the journal under the tagline “Public scholarship on architecture, landscape, and urbanism”. Her editorial direction is described as “harnessing the moral and investigative power of public scholarship to promote equitable cities and sustainable landscapes.”

Levinson has led funding campaigns to support the research and publication on topics that might not otherwise be addressed. This has resulted in funding from the Graham Foundation for three initiatives – History of the Present: Cities in Transition, Future Archive and the Writers’ Fund. The Inequality Chronicles, a series investigating racial, social and economic inequality in American cities, was funded by The Kresge Foundation.

Levinson has also used Places as a foundation on which to build a range of related enterprises that seek to expand participation, readership and the dissemination of scholarship on the built environment. Initiatives include Places Books, a collaboration between Places and Princeton Architectural Press. The first in the series is Where are the Women Architects? by Despina Stratigakos, which has been well received across academia and the architectural profession. The Places Reading List is a collaborative tool that allows readers to share knowledge and generate content.
