= Inga Saffron =

American journalist and architecture critic

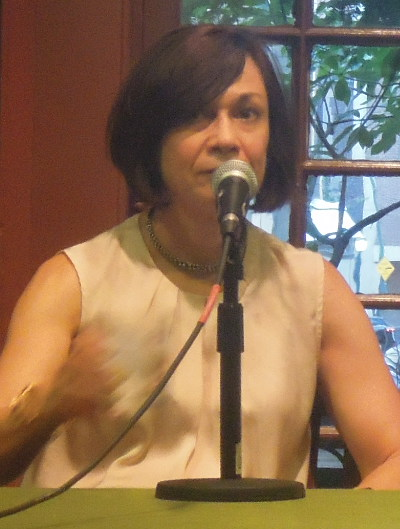
- Saffron in October 2013
- Born: November 9, 1957 (age 67)
- Education: New York University
- Occupation: Journalist
- Spouse: Ken Kalfus
- Children: 1

Inga Saffron (born November 9, 1957) is an American journalist and architecture critic. She won the 2014 Pulitzer Prize for Criticism while writing for The Philadelphia Inquirer.

== Early life and education ==
Saffron was raised in Levittown, New York, and attended New York University. She studied abroad in France for one year, then decided not to return to school and moved to Dublin.

== Career ==
In Ireland, she wrote for local publications and worked as a freelancer with Newsweek. Upon returning to the United States, Saffron wrote for the Courier-News in Somerville, New Jersey.

=== The Philadelphia Inquirer ===
In 1984, she joined The Philadelphia Inquirer as the Inquirer's Moscow correspondent, and served in this capacity until 1998. Saffron covered the Yugoslav Wars and First Chechen War. Beginning in 1999, she became the Inquirer's architecture columnist, writing "Changing Skyline", an architecture column.

Saffron gained notoriety for a 2020 article entitled "Buildings Matter, Too," in which she said destruction of property was not a valid response to the George Floyd incident.

=== Harvard University Graduate School of Design ===
She was a Loeb Fellow at the Harvard University Graduate School of Design in 2012.

== Awards ==
Since becoming The Philadelphia Inquirer's resident architecture critic in 1999, Saffron has won many awards for her insightful and pointed critiques of architecture, planning, and urbanism in her city.

In 2010, she was awarded the Gene Burd Urban Journalism Award.

In 2014, Saffron won the Pulitzer Prize for Criticism after receiving nominations for the prize in 2004, 2008, and 2009.

In 2018, Saffron was one of two architecture critics to be honored with the Vincent Scully Prize, awarded by the National Building Museum; her fellow honoree was Robert Campbell, the architecture critic at The Boston Globe.

== Partial bibliography ==
- 2002: Caviar: The Strange History and Uncertain Future of the World's Most Coveted Delicacy, Broadway Books ISBN 978-0-7679-0623-4
- 2020: Becoming Philadelphia: How an Old American City Made Itself New Again, Rutgers University Press ISBN 978-1978817074

== Personal life ==
Saffron is married to writer Ken Kalfus, with whom she has a daughter, Sky.
