= Chicago Athenaeum =

Architecture and design museum in Illinois, US

- Established: 1988
- Location: 601 S Prospect St, Galena, IL 61036
- President: Christian Narkiewicz-Laine
- Curator: Loannis Karalias
- Website: www.chi-athenaeum.org

The Chicago Athenaeum is a private museum of architecture and design, based in Galena, Illinois. The museum focuses on the art of design in all areas of the discipline: architecture, industrial and product design, graphics, landscape architecture, and urban planning. Among its goals is to advance public education on how design can positively impact the human environment. The museum awards numerous prizes for architecture and design.

== History ==
The museum was founded in 1988 in Chicago, moved to Schaumburg, Illinois in 1998, and to Galena, Illinois in 2004. The museum in Galena is located in a former brewery building (Fulton Brewery, later Galena Brewery, Eulberg & Sons).

In Schaumburg, the museum occupied an old barn at 190 S. Roselle Rd., before the village evicted it in 2004. The Museum also maintained an International Sculpture Park with works of contemporary art. The sculpture park still exists, situated in a park behind the Prairie Center for the Arts.

== Work ==
The museum aims to improve public knowledge and awareness on architecture and design, and how these two fields can affect human environment and the quality of life. It has held exhibitions on architecture and design in several countries, and also holds several international programs abroad. It currently maintains offices and operations in Chicago, Schaumburg, and Galena, Illinois, as well as Dublin, Ireland and Athens, Greece.

== Award programs ==
Since 1996, the museum has organized the annual Good Design Awards. The Museum also co-organizes the American Architecture Awards, the American Prize for Architecture, the International Architecture Awards, and the Green Good Design Awards.

== Management ==
The museum's president is Christian Narkiewicz-Laine. The vice president is Loannis Karalias who is also chief curator and director of design; the director of administration is Lary Sommers, and the director in Europe and COO is Kieran Conlon.

== See also ==
- List of design awards
- List of design museums
