= Marina Otero =

Spanish architect

- Born: 1981 (age 44–45); A Coruña, Spain
- Education: Escuela Técnica Superior de Arquitectura de Madrid
- Occupations: Architect, academic, researcher
- Awards: 2022 Wheelwright Prize

Marina Otero Verzier (A Coruña, 1981) is a Spanish architect, academic, and researcher. She received the Wheelwright Prize in 2022.

== Biography ==
Otero studied architecture at Escuela Técnica Superior de Arquitectura de Madrid. In 2013, as a Fulbright Scholar, she graduated with an MS in critical, curatorial, and conceptual practices in architecture from Columbia GSAPP, and in 2016 she completed her PhD at the ETSAM with the thesis Evanescent Institutions, which examined the emergence of a new paradigm for cultural institutions.

Between 2013 and 2015, Otero was the director of Global Network Programming at Studio X, Columbia GSAPP.

In 2014, she was announced as Chief Curator of the 2016 Oslo Architecture Triennale alongside the Spanish collective After Belonging Agency. One year later, she was named Director of Research at Het Nieuwe Instituut, the Dutch institute for architecture, design and digital culture, leading initiatives such as Automated Landscapes, focusing on the emerging architectures of automated labor, and BURN-OUT: Exhaustion on a planetary scale, instigating forms of care for multispecies, collective bodies.

In 2018, Otero was the curator of WORK, BODY, LEISURE, the Dutch Pavilion at the 16th Venice Architecture Biennale.

Since 2019, Marina has held the position of Head of the Social Design Master's program at Design Academy Eindhoven in the Netherlands.

In 2020, she was part of the curatorial team for Bodies of Water, the theme for the 13th Shanghai Biennale, alongside You Mi, Lucia Pietroiusti, Filipa Ramos and Andrés Jaque, who acted as Chief Curator.

In 2022, she received the Wheelwright Prize with the proposal Future Storage: Architectures to Host the Metaverse, an examination of a new architecture paradigm for storing digital data. Since 2023, Otero has been part of the Architecture and Design Advisory Committee of the Museo Nacional Centro de Arte Reina Sofía in Madrid, Spain.

== Selected publications ==
- Unmanned: Architecture and Security Series (co-editor, 2016)
- After Belonging: The Objects, Spaces, and Territories of the Ways We Stay In Transit (co-editor, 2016)
- Work, Body, Leisure (editor, 2018)
- Architecture of Appropriation (co-editor, 2019)
- More-than-Human (with Andrés Jaque and Lucia Pietroiusti, 2020)

== Selected exhibitions ==
- Steve Bannon: A Propaganda Retrospective by Jonas Staal (2018)
- Spirits in the Material World (2019)
- Malware: Symptoms of Viral Infection (co-curator, 2019)
- I See That I See What You Don’t See at Triennale di Milano (2019).
