= Robert Campbell (journalist) =

American architect and writer (1937–2025)

- Born: Robert Douglas Campbell Jr. March 31, 1937; Buffalo, New York, U.S.
- Died: April 29, 2025 (aged 88); Cambridge, Massachusetts, U.S.
- Education: Harvard College; Columbia University Graduate School of Journalism; Harvard Graduate School of Design
- Occupations: Architect, architecture critic, writer, poet, photographer
- Known for: Architecture critic for The Boston Globe; Pulitzer Prize for Criticism (1996)
- Awards: Pulitzer Prize for Criticism (1996); Fellow of the American Institute of Architects; Vincent Scully Prize (2018)

Robert Campbell (March 31, 1937 – April 29, 2025) was an American architect and Pulitzer Prize-winning writer. For 40 years he was an architecture critic for the Boston Globe. He lived and worked in Cambridge, Massachusetts.

== Early life and education ==
Robert Douglas Campbell Jr. was born March 31, 1937, in Buffalo, New York. His father was an accountant; his mother, Amy (Armitage) Campbell, was a homemaker. He was a graduate of Harvard College, where he graduated Phi Beta Kappa, the Columbia Graduate School of Journalism, and the Harvard Graduate School of Design, where he received the Appleton Traveling Fellowship and Francis Kelley Prize.

== Career ==
=== Architect and critic ===
Beginning in 1973 Campbell was the architecture critic for the Boston Globe. His last piece for the Globe ran in 2017.

Though best known as a writer he was also a practicing architect. After a period working for the firms of Cambridge architects Earl Flansburgh and Josep Lluís Sert he went into independent practice in 1975. Much of his work was as a consultant for the improvement or expansion of cultural institutions, including the Isabella Stewart Gardner Museum and the Boston Symphony Orchestra. He was an urban design consultant to cities and was an advisor to the Mayors' Institute on City Design, which he helped found.

In 1997 he was architect-in-residence at the American Academy in Rome. In 2002 he helped plan and appeared in a television series, "Beyond the Big Dig".

=== Poet and photographer ===
Campbell's poems appeared in the Atlantic Monthly and Harvard Review, among other publications. His photographs were published widely.

=== Teaching ===
Campbell taught at the Harvard Graduate School of Design, the Boston Architectural College, and the University of North Carolina. He was also a visiting scholar at the Massachusetts Institute of Technology. From 1993 to 2002 he was visiting Sam Gibbons Eminent Scholar in Architecture and Urban Planning at the University of South Florida, and in 2002 he was Max Fisher Visiting Professor at the University of Michigan. In 2003 he was a senior fellow in the National Arts Journalism Program at Columbia University.

== Death ==
Campbell died at an assisted living home in Cambridge, on April 29, 2025, at the age of 88.

== Awards ==
In 1996, Campbell won the Pulitzer Prize for Criticism. A Fellow of the American Institute of Architects (AIA), he received the AIA's Medal for Criticism; the Commonwealth Award of the Boston Society of Architects; a Design Fellowship from the National Endowment for the Arts (1976); and grants from the Graham Foundation and the J. M. Kaplan Fund. Campbell was the 2004 recipient of the Award of Honor from the Boston Society of Architects. In 2002 he won a national Columbia Dupont Award for "Beyond the Big Dig". He was a Fellow of the American Academy of Arts and Sciences. Campbell was also a senior fellow of the Design Futures Council. Campbell was one of two architecture critics to be honored with the 2018 Vincent Scully Prize, awarded by the National Building Museum; his fellow honoree was Inga Saffron, who is architecture critic of The Philadelphia Inquirer.

== Partial bibliography ==
- 1992: (with Peter Vanderwarker) Cityscapes of Boston: an American city through time. Houghton Mifflin. 1992. ISBN 0-395-58119-2.
- 2002: (with Curtis W. Fentress, et al.) Civic builders. Academy Press. August 16, 2002. ISBN 0-471-49876-9.
