= Ada Louise Huxtable =

American architecture writer (1921–2013)

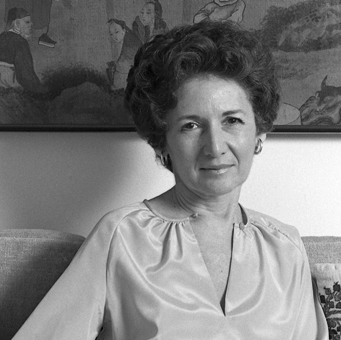
- Born: March 14, 1921 New York City, New York, U.S.
- Died: January 7, 2013 (aged 91) New York City, New York, U.S.
- Occupation: Architectural critic
- Education: Hunter College (BA); New York University
- Subject: Biography
- Notable awards: Pulitzer Prize for Criticism
- Spouse: Garth Huxtable

Ada Louise Huxtable (née Landman; March 14, 1921 – January 7, 2013) was an American architecture critic and writer on architecture. Huxtable established architecture and urban design journalism in North America and raised the public's awareness of the urban environment. In 1970, she was awarded the first ever Pulitzer Prize for Criticism. In 1981, she was named a MacArthur Fellow. Architecture critic Paul Goldberger, also a Pulitzer Prize-winner (1984) for architectural criticism, said in 1996: "Before Ada Louise Huxtable, architecture was not a part of the public dialogue." "She was a great lover of cities, a great preservationist and the central planet around which every other critic revolved," said architect Robert A. M. Stern, dean of the Yale University School of Architecture.

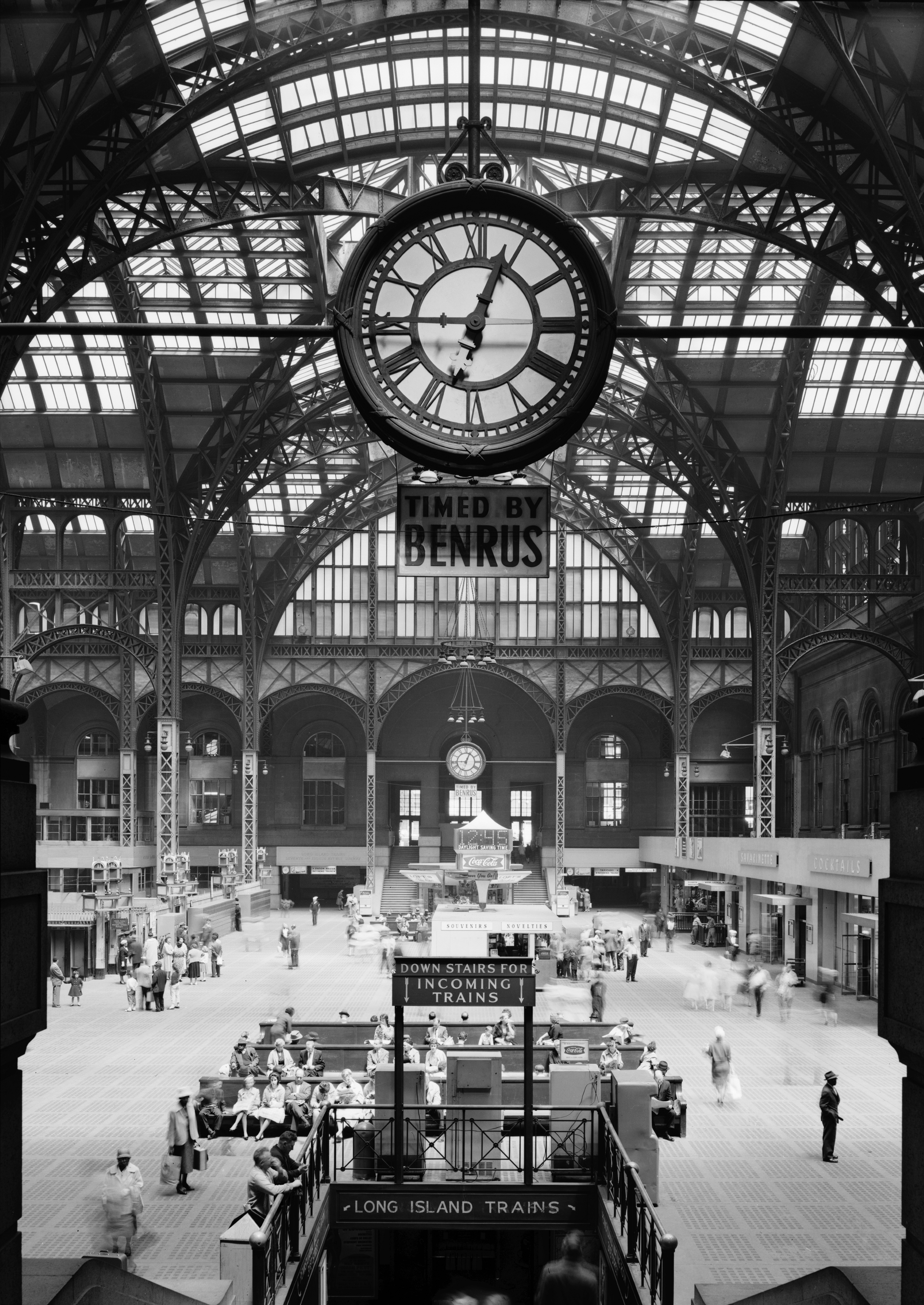
Penn Station in 1962, before its demolition which Huxtable opposed

== Early life ==
Huxtable was born on March 14, 1921, in New York City to Leah Rosenthal Landman and Michael Louis Landman. She graduated magna cum laude from Hunter College in 1941, and after her graduation, studied architectural history at New York University's Institute of Fine Arts. While at Hunter, she designed sets for the college's theater productions.

In 1942, she married industrial designer L. Garth Huxtable, and continued graduate study at New York University from 1942 to 1950. From 1950 to 1951 she spent one year in Italy on a scholarship of the U.S.-Italy Fulbright Commission.

== Career ==
She served as Curatorial Assistant for Architecture and Design at the Museum of Modern Art (MoMA) in New York from 1946 to 1950. She received a Fulbright Scholarship, which enabled her to travel in Italy and research Italian architecture and engineering. Given this opportunity, she left MoMA. In 1958, she also received a Guggenheim Fellowship to research the structural and design advances of American architecture. She was a contributing editor to Progressive Architecture and Art in America from 1950 to 1963 before being the first architecture critic at The New York Times from 1963 to 1981. Huxtable became the second woman named to The Times editorial board in 1973. Her architectural writings were about the humanistic meaning and artistic power that also involved her displeasure for projects that were missing civic engagement. She made architecture a more prevalent part of the public dialogue by appearing on the front page of The New York Times. From 1968 to 1971, her public opinion was found so successful that it was commemorated in New Yorker cartoons. She received grants from the Graham Foundation for a number of projects, including the book Will They Ever Finish Bruckner Boulevard?. In 1981, she left The Times after receiving a MacArthur Fellowship. Huxtable was elected a Fellow of the American Academy of Arts and Sciences in 1974 and a member of the American Philosophical Society in 1989. In 1996, she received the $24 Award from the Museum of the City of New York for her contributions to the city.

Huxtable was the architecture critic for The Wall Street Journal from 1997 until 2012. Her final article in the paper was published one month before she died in 2013.

John Costonis, writing of how public aesthetics is shaped, used her as a prime example of an influential media critic, remarking that "the continuing barrage fired from [her] Sunday column... had New York developers, politicians, and bureaucrats, ducking for years." He reproduces a cartoon in which construction workers, at the base of a building site with a foundation and a few girders lament that "Ada Louise Huxtable already doesn't like it!"

Carter Wiseman wrote, "Huxtable's insistence on intellectual rigor and high design standards made her the conscience of the national architectural community."

She wrote eleven books on architecture, including a 2004 biography of Frank Lloyd Wright for the Penguin Lives series. She was credited as one of the main forces behind the founding of the New York City Landmarks Preservation Commission in 1965. At the same time, she was a severe critic of addressing the city's past, writing in 1968:

Nothing beats keeping the old city where it belongs and where its ghosts are at home. [But] please, gentlemen, no horse-drawn cars, no costumes, no wigs, no stage sets, no cute-old stores, no 're-creations' that never were, no phony little-old-New York.... That is perversion, not preservation.

Huxtable's oral biography, by Lynn Gilbert, is included in Particular Passions: Talk With Women Who Shaped Our Times.

Huxtable was invited to be involved in numerous juries and committees. She served as a juror for the Pritzker Architecture Prize and Preamium Imperiale of Japan. She was also a member on the Architectural Selection and Building Design Committees for the Getty Center, Getty Villa.

== Death and archive ==
Huxtable died on January 7, 2013, at the Memorial Sloan Kettering Cancer Center in Manhattan, New York City.

Shortly after her death, the Getty Research Institute announced its acquisition of the Huxtable archive, which spans 1921 through 2013 and includes 93 boxes and 19 file drawers of Huxtable's manuscripts and typescripts, reports, correspondence, and documents, as well as research files full of notes, clippings, photocopies, and, most notably, original photographs of architecture and design by contemporary photographers.

== Publications ==
- Goodbye History, Hello Hamburger: An Anthology of Architectural Delights and Disasters (1986) ISBN 9780891331193
- Architecture, Anyone? Cautionary Tales of the Building Art (1988) ISBN 9780394529097
- Kicked a Building Lately? (1989) ISBN 9780520062078 (first published in 1976)
- Will They Ever Finish Bruckner Boulevard?, a collection of material appearing in The New York Times (1989)
- The Tall Building Artistically Reconsidered, a history of the skyscraper (1993) ISBN 9780394537733
- The Unreal America: Architecture and Illusion (1999) ISBN 9781565840553
- On Architecture: Collected Reflections on a Century of Change (2008) ISBN 9780802717078
- Frank Lloyd Wright: A Life (2008) ISBN 9780143114291
