= Edwin Heathcote =

- Born: Edwin Heathcote; 1968 (age 57–58); London, England
- Occupation: Architect

Edwin Heathcote (born London) is a writer, architect and designer. He has been the architecture and design critic of The Financial Times since 1999, and is the author of books on architecture and design. He is the founder and editor-in-chief of online design writing archive readingdesign.org.

Since 2020 he has been the Keeper of Meaning at The Cosmic House, Charles Jencks' grade II listed former London home.

== Publications ==
- Imre Makovecz: The Wings of the Soul, Academy Editions, 1997
- Budapest: A Guide to 20th Century Architecture, Batsford, 1997
- Church Builders (with Iona Spens), Academy Editions, 1997
- Monument Builders, Academy Editions/John Wiley & Sons, 1998
- Bank Builders, Academy Editions/John Wiley & Sons, 2000
- Cinema Builders, Academy Editions/John Wiley & Sons, 2001
- Theatre: London: An Architectural Guide, Batsford 2002
- Furniture & Architecture (editor), Architectural Design, Academy Editions/John Wiley & Sons, 2002
- London Caffs, Academy Editions/John Wiley & Sons, 2004
- Contemporary Church Architecture, Academy Editions/John Wiley & Sons, 2007
- The Architecture of Hope, Frances Lincoln, 2010
- The Meaning of Home, Frances Lincoln, 2012
- On the Street: In-Between Architecture, HENI 2022
