= Christian Narkiewicz-Laine =

American architect, painter, writer and poet

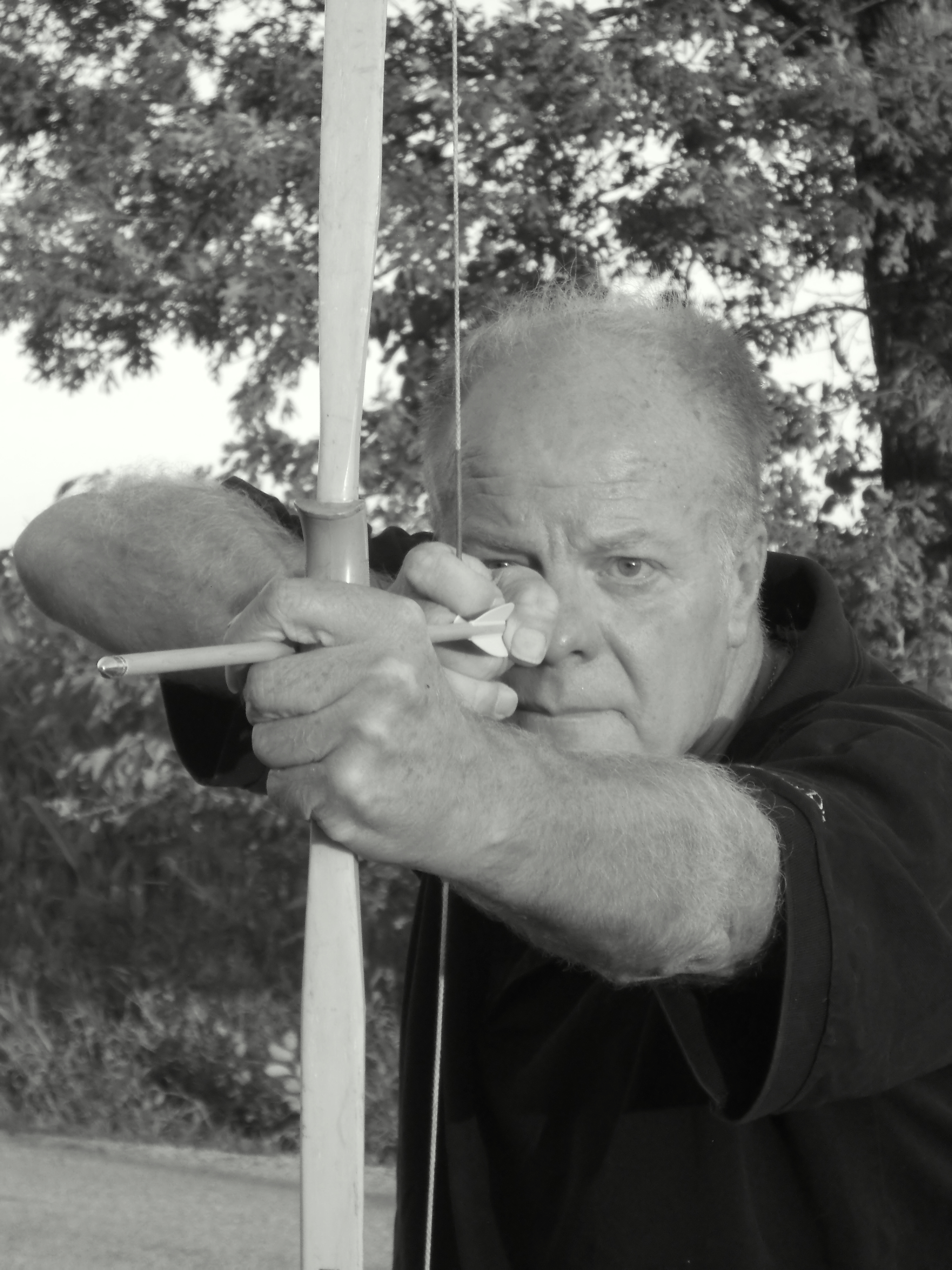
Christian Narkiewicz-Laine, 2013

Christian Narkiewicz-Laine (born June 3, 1952) is an American architect, painter, writer and poet. He is the founding president of the Chicago Athenaeum Museum of Architecture and Design.

== Early life and education ==
Christian K. Laine was born in Colorado Springs, Colorado. He studied architecture at the University of Strasbourg in France and later archaeology at the American School of Archaeology in Athens, Greece. In 1973, he returned to the US and studied art history at Lake Forest College, Illinois.

== Early career ==
After finishing his studies, he worked for the American Institute of Architects from 1977 to 1981, as well as writing for Inland Architect magazine from 1978 to 1981. In 1978, Narkiewicz-Laine became the first architecture critic to be hired at the Chicago Sun-Times where he wrote a weekly column on national architecture, design, preservation and art.

In 1981, he resigned from the newspaper and went to live at The American Academy in Rome for two years. Narkiewicz-Laine returned to Chicago in 1982 and worked for Joseph P. Kennedy Enterprises at the Merchandise Mart in Chicago and at the Kennedy family's properties in New York and Washington D.C.

In 1990, the Chicago Tribune called him the Ambassador of Design.

== Chicago Athenaeum ==
In 1988, along with Greek architect Ioannis Karalias, he founded The Chicago Athenaeum: Museum of Architecture and Design in Chicago

In 1994 Laine and Karalias went on to further establish the Chicago Athenaeum International Sculpture Park in Schaumburg, Illinois, a 20-acre natural Prairie park with contemporary works of art by artists from Finland, Norway, Israel, Poland, Germany, Japan, Iceland, and the United States.

In 1996, Narkiewicz-Laine launched the Good Design Awards and the American Architecture Awards. In 2005, he established the International Architecture Awards.

In 2003, Narkiewicz-Laine pled guilty to charges that he lied to an FBI agent investigating fraud at the Chicago Athenaeum. Narkiewicz-Lane admitted he created false invoices for a 1996 exhibition at the Athenaeum, defrauding the Royal Danish Consulate of $62,763, and was sentenced to three months in prison.

== Art career ==
Narkiewicz-Laine is an active artist not only in the area of architecture and design but also in poetry, sculpture, literature and painting. In 1980, he studied and worked at the American Academy in Rome and exhibited his works in France, Italy, and the United States throughout the 1980s.

In the 1990s, his early Neo-Expressionist works in a style reminiscent of Anselm Kiefer and inspired by the writings of the Argentine writer, Jorge Luis Borges, and the Austrian poet, Rainer Maria Rilke, were exhibited at the Buenos Aires International Biennial, Warsaw History Museum, Budapest Mücsarnok Museum, Galeri Jaroslava Fragnera in Prague, Göteborg Konstmuseum, Thessaloniki Municipal Museum, São Paulo Biennale, and Bückeburg Palace, Schaumburg-Lippe, Germany. Works from this period are collected by museums in the United States and Europe. In 2000, he moved his studio from Chicago to Galena, Illinois where he is influenced and inspired as a landscape painter by the Driftless Area of the Upper Mississippi River Valley. In 2007, the Dubuque Museum of Art selected and exhibited two of his works for the Dubuque Biennial.

== Poetry and prose ==
Narkiewicz-Laine has published a number of works of poetry and prose, including:

- Distant Fires, Metropolitan Arts Press, (1997),
- Inspiration: Nature and the Poet (The Collected Poems of the Chicago architect, Louis H. Sullivan) (1999)
- Baltic Hours: A collection of poems, Metropolitan Arts Press, (1999)
- Greenland, Metropolitan Arts Press, (2003)
- Baltiskow Valandos (Baltic Hours), Baltos Lankos (2007)
- American Poets against the War, Metropolitan Arts Press, (2009)
- Mississippi River: In Four Seasons, Metropolitan Arts Press, (2010)
- Bjarke Ingels: Danish Architect, Metropolitan Arts Press, (2010)
- Rings around Saturn, Metropolitan Arts Press, (2014)
- The Architecture of Necessity, Metropolitan Arts Press, (2014)

== Honors, achievements, and awards ==
- Chicago's 40 under 40 Achievers by Crain's Chicago Business, 1991
