= Harvard Design Magazine =

Journal

- Former editors: Jennifer Sigler
- Categories: Architecture and Design Magazine
- Frequency: Biannual
- Publisher: Harvard Graduate School of Design
- Founder: William S. Saunders, Nancy Levinson
- Founded: 1997
- Country: United States
- Based in: Cambridge, Massachusetts, U.S.
- Language: English
- Website: harvarddesignmagazine.org
- ISSN: 1093-4421

Harvard Design Magazine is a biannual publication of the Harvard Graduate School of Design. It is indexed by the standard subject bibliographies, including Avery Index to Architectural Periodicals and the Bibliography of the History of Art. Harvard Design Magazine is a registered nonprofit organization.
