= The Architectural Review =

British architectural magazine

- Cover of the December 2018/January 2019 issue
- Editor: Manon Mollard
- Categories: Architecture
- Frequency: 10 per year
- Founded: 1896
- First issue: November 1896
- Company: Metropolis International
- Country: United Kingdom
- Based in: London
- Language: English
- Website: www.architectural-review.com
- ISSN: 0003-861X

The Architectural Review is a monthly international architectural magazine. It has been published in London since 1896. Its articles cover the built environment – which includes landscape, building design, interior design and urbanism – as well as theory of these subjects.

== History ==
The Architectural Review was founded as a monthly magazine, the Architectural Review for the Artist and Craftsman, in 1896 by Percy Hastings, owner of the Architectural Press, with an editorial board of Reginald Blomfield, Mervyn Macartney and Ernest Newton.

In 1927 his third son, Hubert de Cronin Hastings, became joint editor (with Christian Barman) of both The Architectural Review and the Architects' Journal, a weekly. Together they made substantial changes to the aims and style of the review, which became a general arts magazine with an architectural emphasis. Contributors from other artistic fields were brought in, among them Hilaire Belloc, Robert Byron, Cyril Connolly, D. H. Lawrence, Paul Nash, Nikolaus Pevsner, P. Morton Shand, Osbert and Sacheverell Sitwell, and Evelyn Waugh. John Betjeman was an assistant editor from 1930 to 1934. The editorial board included Pevsner, Hugh Casson, Osbert Lancaster and James Maude Richards. The design of the review was innovative, with bold use of layout, typefaces and photographs; graphic elements were commissioned from Eric Gill and Edward Bawden. The articles on European Modernist architecture by P. Morton Shand published from July 1934 were among the earliest in Britain on the subject. By about 1935 the magazine had acquired a leading position in the discourse surrounding Modernism.

The journal was influential after the Second World War in raising awareness of "townscape" (urban design), partly through regular articles by assistant editor Gordon Cullen, author of several books on the subject.

In 1999, the magazine launched its inaugural AR Emerging Architecture Awards, an annual international prize that "grants early recognition to young designers and celebrates the architectural stars of tomorrow."

In January 2017, title owner Ascential announced its intention to sell 13 titles including The Architectural Review; the 13 "heritage titles" were to be "hived off into a separate business while buyers are sought." It was one of 13 titles acquired from Ascential by Metropolis International in a £23.5m cash deal, announced on 1 June 2017.

The Architectural Review remains in print, published ten times per year, while its online version is updated daily.

== Notable people ==
- Henry Wilson – first editor 1896–1901
- John Betjeman – assistant editor, 1930 to 1934
- James Maude Richards – co-editor or editor, 1935 to 1971, excluding the war years
- Nikolaus Pevsner – acting editor 1943 to 1945 and member of editorial board 1945 to 1970
- Rayner Banham – literary editor, in 1952
- Dariush Borbor (architect and urban planner) – former correspondent and contributor 1960s to 1980s
- Peter Davey – editor 1980 to 2005
- László Moholy-Nagy – photographer
- Gordon Cullen – art editor
- Robert Melville – art critic
- Peter Blundell Jones – contributor
- Stephen Gardiner – contributor
- Douglass Haskell – contributor
- Ian Nairn – contributor
- Catherine Slessor, managing editor 1992–2009, editor 2010–2015
- Christine Murray, editor, 2015–2018
- Manon Mollard, editor

== Archives ==
- Volume 1 (November 1896–May 1897)
- Volume 2 (June–November 1897)
- Volume 3 (December 1897–May 1898)
- Volume 4 (June–November 1898)
- Volume 5 (December 1898–May 1899)
- Volume 6 (June–December 1899)
- Volume 7 (January–June 1900)
- Volume 8 (July–December 1900)
- Volume 9 (January–June 1901)
- Volume 10 (July–December 1901)
- Volume 11 (January–June 1902)
- Volume 12 (July–December 1902)
- Volume 13/14 (1903)
- Volume 15/16 (1904)
- Volume 17 (January–June 1905)
- Volume 18 (July–December 1905)
- Volume 19 (January–June 1906)
- Volume 20 (July–December 1906)
- Volume 21 (January–June 1907)
- Volume 22 (July–December 1907)
- Volume 23 (January–June 1908)
- Volume 24 (July–December 1908)
- Volume 25 (January–June 1909)
- Volume 26 (July–December 1909)
- [unlocated]
- Volume 50 (July–December 1921)
- Volume 51 (January–June 1922)
- Volume 52 (July–December 1922)
- Volume 53 (January–June 1923)
- Volume 54 (July–December 1923)
- Volume 55 (January–June 1924)
- Volume 56 (July–December 1924)
- Volume 57 (January–June 1925)
- Volume 58 (July–December 1925)
- Volume 59 (January–June 1926)
- Volume 60 (July–December 1926)
- Volume 61 (January–June 1927)
- Volume 62 (July–December 1927)
