= Allison Arieff =

American writer on design

Allison Arieff (born October 29, 1966) is an American opinion columnist and editorial writer for the San Francisco Chronicle. She was previously Editorial Director of Print for the MIT Technology Review. She was previously editorial director for the urban planning and policy think tank, SPUR (the San Francisco Bay Area Planning and Urban Research Association). From 2007-2020, she wrote a regular column about architecture, design, cities and technology for the Opinion section of The New York Times.

Early in her career, she held editorial positions at Random House, Oxford University Press and Chronicle Books. In 2000, Arieff helped found the architecture and design magazine Dwell, and in 2002, following the departure of founding editor Karrie Jacobs, she was promoted to editor-in-chief. During her tenure the magazine expanded its readership, and received a number of awards, including a National Magazine Award for general excellence. She left the magazine in 2006. She has been an editor at Sunset, worked at Good magazine and was a senior content lead for the design and consulting firm IDEO from 2006 to 2008.

Arieff holds a B.A. in history from University of California, Los Angeles, and an M.A. in art history from University of California, Davis. She completed her PhD coursework in American studies at New York University.

== Bibliography ==
- Prefab (book design by Bryan Burkhart), Gibbs Smith (2002) (subject: prefabricated houses)
- Trailer Travel: A Visual History of Mobile America (design by Burkhart, photography by Phil Noyes), Gibbs Smith (2002) (subject: mobile homes)
- Spa, Taschen (2004) (subject: spas)
