= Laura Harding =

Laura Harding is an Australian architectural practitioner and critic. Harding works across architecture and urban design, with a particular focus on the public realm. She is also an architectural critic and an active participant in the public culture of architecture. Harding regularly contributes to architectural education as a visiting critic at the University of New South Wales and the University of Sydney. From 2006 to 2012, she taught with Glenn Murcutt in the third year design program at the University of New South Wales.

== Biography ==
Harding was born in Sydney in 1975. She studied architecture at the University of Sydney, graduating with a Bachelor of Science (Architecture) in 1995 and a Bachelor of Architecture in 1998. She has worked at the Sydney-based practice Hill Thalis Architecture + Urban Projects for eighteen years, having joined the practice in 1996 as a student.

== Criticism ==
Harding began writing architectural criticism in 2004, first for Architecture Australia, the journal of record of Australian architecture, and subsequently for a range of professional publications and mainstream media outlets. She was appointed a contributing editor to Architecture Australia in 2005, a position she continues to hold. Harding has had criticism published in The Guardian and is a regular contributor to The Saturday Paper.

Harding was guest editor, alongside Philip Thalis, of a special issue of Architecture Australia on Urban Housing (Architecture Australia (May 2014).

== Architectural work ==
Harding's project work crosses architecture and urban design, with a particular focus on multi-residential and urban projects. Her work includes the award-winning project Substation No. 175, which converted a remnant substation building in Surry Hills into a 'tiny urban tower'. This intensified the use of the tiny site and aimed to show that "no lot need be too small to be used effectively".

Harding was project urban designer on the winning entry in the international design competition for East Darling Harbour (Barangaroo) by Hill Thalis Architecture + Urban Projects, Paul Berkemeier Architects and Jane Irwin Landscape Architecture. This proposed a new urban street pattern, waterfront park and urban grain for the Millers Point wharves. The scheme did not go ahead.

=== Selected projects with Hill Thalis Architecture + Urban Projects ===
Crystal Housing – adaptive reuse located in the city's inner west, which accommodates seven diverse affordable housing units within the old shell and structure of a modest factory building.

Lennox Bridge Portals – a project for making key urban connections that reveals the complex archaeology and layering formerly hidden within the State-Heritage-listed Lennox Bridge in Parramatta. Scheduled for completion 2015.

Studios 54 – a commercial and residential building in Surry Hills that explores what one shop and four apartments can add to the life and vitality of the city. Completed 2014. This won the Aaron Bolot Award for Multiresidential Housing at the 2015 NSW Chapter Australian Institute of Architects Awards.

Mountainside House – a holiday house on a beautiful South-Coast mountainside that subtly orients itself to a landscape elements through a series of multiple long and cross axes that can be opened and closed within the building. Completed 2013.

Horizon House – a coastal holiday house

Little Bay Master Plan – a 13 hectare residential subdivision on the former UNSW site adjacent the Prince Henry Hospital. The plan reconnects the site to the surrounding urban area, preserving important site features in a system of memorable parks and landscaped spaces. Scheduled for completion 2015

Green Square Library competition – a proposal for the Green Square Library, undertaken with Hill Thalis and McGregor Westlake architects.

== Public activities ==
Laura was a juror for the Public Architecture and Urban Design categories of the NSW Chapter Australian Institute of Architects Awards in 2011.

== Awards ==
Adrian Ashton Award for Architectural Criticism, 2013, Australian Institute of Architects NSW Awards.

Commendation, Australian Institute of Architects NSW Chapter Award for Multi-residential Architecture (2005) NSW Master Builders Award for Adaptive Reuse (2005)
