= Cathleen McGuigan =

American magazine editor

Cathleen McGuigan was editor in chief of the American magazine Architectural Record from 2011 to 2022. She previously served as an architecture critic and arts editor at Newsweek. Her writing has been published in The New York Times Magazine, Smithsonian, Harper's Bazaar, and Rolling Stone. McGuigan has also taught at Columbia University's Graduate School of Journalism.

McGuigan graduated from Brown University and also studied at Harvard.

She and her husband live in Sag Harbor, New York.
