= Architect Magazine =

Magazine about architecture

Architect
- Company: Zonda Home
- Country: United States
- Language: English
- Website: www.architectmagazine.com

Architect Magazine is the successor to Architecture, one of a series of periodicals published from before World War I by the American Institute of Architects.

== Overview ==
This is the sixth (Note: Or seventh, because one title was reclaimed in 1929) iteration of a magazine about the field associated with American Institute of Architects and its members. This iteration stylizes their publication's name with a capital M: Architect Magazine, with Architectureal Design as a subtitle.

At times, they run a series by a famous, award-winning architect; in 2007. One such series won an award. In 2014, they wrote about 1898-born Julia Morgan, a "Pioneering Female Architect" who, because she "was experienced in reinforced concrete as she was in European design," was chosen, in the aftermath of the 1906 San Francisco earthquake, to design the rebuilding of a major hotel.

== History ==
The first of American Institute of Architects's periodicals was the Quarterly Bulletin. This was followed, beginning in 1913, by:

- Journal of the American Institute of Architects (through 1928)
- Octagon (1929-1994), at which point the above title was resumed, through 1957
- The American Institute of Architects Journal (AIA Journal)
- Architecture

As of when the last of these ceased publication (2006), the title was Architecture: The AIA Journal. The successor is not owned by but is affiliated with AIA, and uses their name on their masthead.

== Features ==
In addition to running interviews with and articles about those in the field, be it in teaching about or doing, some of their articles go beyond the actual design work, such as labor conditions for their projects, both in non-Western countries and in the USA. They've covered other types of architectural disputes, including international ones such as regarding "the Eiffel Tower to temporarily alter its silhouette."
