= Dezeen =

Architecture and design website

- Screenshot of the website in December 2024
- Website type: Online magazine
- Available in: English
- Creator: Marcus Fairs (†)
- Editor: Tom Ravenscroft
- Website: dezeen.com
- Launched: November 2006; 20 years ago

Dezeen is an online architecture, interiors and design magazine based in London, with offices in Hoxton, as well as New York City and Shanghai.

== History ==
Dezeen was launched in London by Marcus Fairs at the end of November 2006. Its New York City office launched in 2015 and its Shanghai office opened in 2021.

Dezeen currently has a staff of 50. Its editor is writer and architectural historian Tom Ravenscroft.

In 2018, the magazine launched annual Dezeen Awards honouring achievements in the best architecture, interiors and design around the world. In 2023 it launched a Chinese Awards programme.

In March 2021, Dezeen was acquired by Danish media company JP/Politiken Media Group. Dezeen was JP/Politikens Hus’ first acquisition outside Scandinavia. The acquisition was part of JP/Politikens Hus’ 2025 strategy to increase revenue from DKK 3bn to 5bn. At the time of the acquisition, the site had more than 3 million unique monthly visitors and more than 6.5 million social media followers.

Marcus Fairs (1967–2022), Dezeen founder, CEO and editor-in-chief died on 30 June 2022. Obituaries were written for Fairs in many publications, including The Times of London, and Domus.

== Reception ==
Dezeen was named the best architecture blog by The Independent newspaper in 2012, and The Times newspaper included the magazine in its list of the "50 top websites you can't live without" in 2013. Dezeen was also included in Time magazine's "Design 100" list of the "most influential forces in global design".

== Awards ==
Dezeen was named best business publication in 2022 and media brand of the year in 2019 by the Professional Publishers Association, best small digital publisher of the year in 2021 and 2018 by the Association of Online Publishers and editorial brand of the year in 2022 and 2019 by the International Building Press. Ravenscroft was named editor of the year by the Association of Online Publishers in 2023.

== See also ==
- Archdaily
- Architectural Digest
- Designboom
- Domus
