= Julie Willis =

Australian architectural historian and academic

- Citizenship: Australian
- Education: University of Melbourne (BArch, PhD)
- Occupation(s): Professor, editor
- Known for: Architectural history

Julie Willis is an Australian architectural historian and academic. She is currently Professor of Architecture and Dean of the Faculty of Architecture, Building and Planning at the University of Melbourne.

== Education and career ==
Willis gained her BArch from the University of Melbourne in 1993, and her PhD from the same institution in 1998.

The majority of Willis's academic career has been spent at the University of Melbourne, following her appointment in 1998. This includes roles within the discipline of architecture and the wider university administration. Willis was appointed Dean of the Faculty of Architecture, Building and Planning in 2016, following a three-year period as Pro Vice Chancellor – Research Capability (2013 to 2016).

Willis plays an active role in the wider scholarly community. She was a member of the Australian Research Council College of Experts from 2013 to 2015, in which capacity she was both Deputy Chair and Chair for selection panels, and also sat on the board of the Academic Women in Leadership program at the University of Melbourne.

Willis is a former editor of Fabrications, the journal of the Society of Architectural Historians, Australia New Zealand (SAHANZ), 2000–2003, and continues as a member of its editorial board. She is also a member of the advisory board of Architectural Theory Review and editorial board member of The Conversation. Willis also writes on architecture for the professional press.

With colleagues Professor Naomi Stead, Dr Karen Burns, Dr Gill Matthewson and Justine Clark, Willis is a founding member of Parlour: women, equity architecture, a research-based advocacy organisation working for gender equity in Australian architecture.

== Research ==
Willis's research focuses on the history of Australian architecture from 1890–1950. With Philip Goad, she initiated and edited the Encyclopedia of Australian Architecture. Published in 2012, this won the 2012 Australian Institute of Architects National Bates Smart Award for Architecture in the Media. She is now working on a new short history of Australian architecture.

Willis has particular expertise in the development of modern hospital architecture in Australia and in women in Australian architecture. The book Women Architects in Australia 1900–1960, co-authored with Bronwyn Hanna and published in 2002, is the first book-length study of women in the Australian architectural profession. This historical knowledge is brought to bear on contemporary discussions of gender equity in architecture through Willis's work on the project Equity and Diversity in the Australian Architecture Profession and its offshoot Parlour. Her research also extends into current thinking in hospital and health design through the collaborative research project Designing for Wellbeing: Realising Benefits for Patients through Best Practice Hospital Design, which Willis leads.

== Selected publications ==
- Julie Willis and Bronwyn Hanna, Women Architects in Australia 1900–1960 (Royal Australian Institute of Architects, 2002).
- Philip Goad and Julie Willis, eds, Encyclopedia of Australian Architecture (Cambridge University Press, 2012)
- Kate Darian-Smith, Julie Willis, eds, Designing Schools: Space, Place and Pedagogy (Routledge, 2017).
- Julie Willis, Philip Goad, Cameron Logan, Architecture and the Modern Hospital: Nosokomeion to Hygeia (Routledge, 2018).
