= Karen Burns (academic) =

Australian architect

- Born: 1962 (age 63–64)
- Education: Monash University, RMIT University
- Occupation: Architect

Karen Burns (born 1962) is an Australian architectural historian and theorist. She is currently a senior lecturer in architecture at the Melbourne School of Design, University of Melbourne.

== Early years and education ==
Born in January 1962, Burns grew up in the Melbourne suburb of Beaumaris. Her feminist activism first found expression in 1978 when she worked as a volunteer at a newly established refuge for women and children escaping family violence.

Burns studied English literature and art history at Monash University, the latter with Patrick McCaughey and Conrad Hamann. She was Hamann's first honours student. Burns graduated with a Bachelor of Arts (hons) in 1984 and a Master of Arts in 1987. She began studying architecture at RMIT University in 1986, and began editing the magazine Transition the same year. Her PhD, "Urban Tourism, 1851-53: sightseeing, representation and The Stones of Venice" was completed in 1999 at the School of Fine Arts, Classical Studies and Archaeology, University of Melbourne.

== Academic career ==
Burns has held academic positions at a number of universities in Melbourne. She began her academic career at RMIT University (1986–1995) and then joined the Department of English and Cultural Studies and Department of Fine Arts, Classics and Archaeology, University of Melbourne (1997–1999, 2001). She spent three years at the Centre for Ideas, Victorian College of the Arts (2002–2004), of which she was Acting Director in 2002–2003. She joined the new Department of Architecture at Monash University in 2008 and was later appointed as a Senior Lecturer in Architecture at the Melbourne School of Design, University of Melbourne, a position she still holds.

Her academic research focuses on three principal areas: Australian frontier housing and problems of interpretation, late-twentieth-century feminist architectural history and theory, and alliances between architects, aesthetics and manufacturers in mid-nineteenth-century Britain. In relation to the last topic she is working on a book titled Object Lessons: Demonstrating Victorian Design Reform, 1835–1870.

Burns was an active researcher on the Australian Research Council funded project Equity and Diversity in the Australian Architectural Profession: women, work and leadership (2011-2014), which was led by Naomi Stead of the University of Queensland. One of its key outcomes was Parlour: women, equity, architecture. Burns was instrumental in establishing this organisation with colleagues from the research project, and was responsible for coining the name Parlour. This can be understood in the context of her long engagement in feminist and social activism in architecture.

Burns has given invited keynote presentations at three conferences: Fabulations, the Annual Conference of SAHANZ, University of Tasmania, July 2012; Interstices, University of Tasmania, November 2011; Whirlwinds Symposium, Sexuate Subjects: Politics, Poetics and Ethics, Bartlett School of Architecture, University College London, December 2010. She has presented her research work at many more conferences and symposia and is an active member of the academic community.

== Editorial work and architectural criticism ==
Burns has played important roles in a range of publications, both scholarly and professional, as editor, contributor and advisor.

=== Transition: Discourse on Architecture ===
She was editor of Transition: Discourse on Architecture, an influential quarterly journal published by RMIT University, from July 1986 – December 1991. This saw her edit 17 issues of the publication. From 1987, this was an editorial partnership with Harriet Edquist. Highlights of the journal over this period include:

- no. 25 (1988) Women & Architecture
- no. 26 (1988) The Bicentennial Issue
- no. 27/28 (1989) New Urbanism, which included a 25-page review of the New Parliament House by James Weirick.

Transition was also a vehicle for exhibitions and competitions, including:

- 1991 Transition Companion City Competition. The competition "explored the future for our cities through ideas of design, energy conservation, planning and the environment" and also resulted in exhibition at Australian Centre for Contemporary Art (ACCA) curated by Burns and Edquist.
- 1989 Transition 10th Anniversary Conference. This focussed on the topic Robin Boyd', the Architect as Critic, and was accompanied by a tour of Boyd's houses and an exhibition (curated with Philip Goad) of Boyd's publications at the State Library of Victoria. The conference papers were published together with Boyd's catalogue raisonnee in 1992.

=== Australian & New Zealand Journal of Art ===
Burns edited four issues of this publication, which is the journal of the Art Association of Australia and New Zealand (AAANZ) between 2004 and 2006.

=== Editorial boards ===
Burns also sits on the editorial boards of a number of academic journals: Fabrications (journal of SAHANZ), Interstices, Ultima Thule and Architectural Theory Review.. She has been a contributing editor to Architecture Australia.

=== Criticism ===
Architectural criticism by Burns has been published in a range of professional journals including Architecture Australia, Architectural Review Australia, Monument and Landscape Architecture Australia.

== Activism and public engagement ==
Burns has a long history of involvement with feminist activism and social justice issues in architecture. She is a founding member of the Melbourne-based organisation E1027: Women in Architecture (1990) – established with Harriet Edquist and others. In 1991 the organisation had 80 members, including architects Maggie Edmond, Anne Cunningham, Ann Keddie, Mary Ruth Sindrey, Val Austin, Suzanne Dance, Eli Giannini, Mardi Butcher, Jill Garner and Anna Ely. Members also included women artists such as Kathy Temin, Sarah Curtis, Lauren Berkowitz and Jan Nelson.

In 1991 Burns curated the exhibition Insight Out with Anna Horne. This took the form of architectural installations at 200 Gertrude Street and five other outdoor sites in Fitzroy, Melbourne. The exhibition examined urban change, gentrification, housing stress and historical memory.

In 2013 Burns played a key role in establishing Parlour: women, equity, architecture, with Justine Clark, Naomi Stead and others. Developed as a "space to speak" for women in architecture, this provides research, resources and informed opinion about gender equity and architecture. Writing by Burns on Parlour includes:

- Who Wants to be a Woman Architect?
- The Elephant in our Parlour: Everyday Sexism in Architecture
- Why Do Women Leave?

Parlour also ran the 2012 symposium, Transform: Altering the Future of Architecture, which was co-convened by Burns with colleagues Justine Clark and Naomi Stead and hosted by the University of Melbourne.

== Selected publications ==
- Karen Burns and Lori Brown. ""Telling Transnational Histories of Women in Architecture, 1960–2015". Architectural Histories, vol. 8, no. 1, 2020, doi:10.5334/ah.403
- Karen Burns. "Anthologizing Post-Structuralism: Architecture, Écriture, Gender, and Subjectivity". The Figure of Knowledge Conditioning Architectural Theory 1960s - 1990s, edited by Loosen, Sebastiann, and Heynickx, Rajesh, et al., 1st ed., Leuven University Press, 2020, pp. 255–267. doi:10.2307/j.ctv16x2c28.16
- Karen Burns. "Time and Telegraphy: Nineteenth-Century Contexts for Stained Glass". 19: Interdisciplinary Studies in the Long Nineteenth Century, vol. 2020, no. 30, 2020, pp. 18-. doi:10.16995/ntn.2902
- Karen Burns, "Between the Walls: remembering colonial frontier space at Purrumbete, 1901 – 02" in Interspaces: Art + Architectural Exchanges from East to West, eds. Anthony White and Flavia Marcello (2012), pp. 1–15.
- Karen Burns, "The Woman/Architect Distinction", Architectural Theory Review, vol.17, no. 2, December 2012, Taylor and Francis, Abingdon, Oxon, UK, pp 234–244.
- Karen Burns, "A Girl’s Own Adventure: gender in the contemporary architectural theory anthology", Journal of Architectural Education, vol. 65, no. 2, (2012) Wiley-Blackwell, New Jersey, 127–136. Also published on Parlour: women, equity, architecture http://archiparlour.org/a-girls-own-adventure/
- Karen Burns, "Frontier conflict, contact, exchange: re-imagining colonial architecture", Imagining... Proceedings of the 27th International SAHANZ Conference, 30 June to 2 July, Society of Architectural Historians, Australia and New Zealand (SAHANZ), 2012, pp. 70–80.
- Karen Burns, "Ex libris: archaeologies of feminism, architecture and deconstruction", Architectural Theory Review, vol 15, issue 3 (2010) Taylor & Francis, Oxon, UK, pp. 242–265.
- Karen Burns, "The Grammar of Ornament: A Pacific Tale", Cultural Cross-Roads: Proceedings of the 26th International SAHANZ Conference, ed. Julia Gatley, Auckland University, Auckland 3–5 July 2009, Society of Architectural Historians, Australia and New Zealand (SAHANZ).
- Karen Burns, "The Afterlife of an Architectural Event", Assemblage, 41, The MIT Press, Cambridge, Massachusetts, March 2001, 16.
- Karen Burns, "A House For Josephine Baker", in Postcolonial Space(s), eds. Gülsüm Nalbantoglu and Bobby Wong Chong Thai, Princeton Architectural Press, New York, 1997, 53–72.
- Karen Burns, "Topographies of Tourism: 'Documentary' Photography and The Stones of Venice", Assemblage 32, The MIT Press, Cambridge, Massachusetts, July 1997, 22–44.
- Karen Burns, "Architecture/Discipline/Bondage" in Desiring Practices: Architecture, Gender and the Interdisciplinary, eds. Duncan McCorquodale, Katerina Rüedi and Sarah Wigglesworth, Black Dog Publishing, London, 1996, 72–87.

== Exhibitions ==
Burns has curated a number of exhibitions. These include:

- 1991 Insight Out, 200 Gertrude Street and 5 other outdoor sites in Fitzroy – with Anna Horne.
- 1991 Diologhi per una possibile Utopia, Museo Civico Cuneo, Piedmont and Turin Politecnico, Italy – with Harriet Edquist and Mauro Baracco
- 1991 Companion City, ACCA (Australian Centre of Contemporary Art) – with Harriet Edquist.
- 1989 Robin Boyd: The Architect as Critic, State Library of Victoria – with Harriet Edquist, Philip Goad and Dean Cass.
