= Naomi Stead =

Australian architectural academic

Naomi Stead is an architectural academic, scholar and critic, based in Melbourne, Australia. She is currently the Director of the Design and Creative Practice Enabling Capability Platform at RMIT University, Australia.

== Early years and education ==
Naomi Stead was born in February 1975 and grew up in Adelaide, South Australia. She studied architecture at the Louise Laybourne School of Architecture, University of South Australia, graduating with a Bachelor of Architecture with first class honours in 1998. Stead's PhD, ‘On the Object of the Museum and its Architecture’, was conferred by The University of Queensland in 2004. The Project, supervised by John Macarthur and Antony Moulis, examined recent developments in museum architecture, with particular reference to Daniel Libeskind's Jewish Museum (Berlin) and the National Museum of Australia (Canberra) designed by ARM.

== Academic career ==
Stead began her academic career at the University of Technology, Sydney (2001–2009) and became a research fellow at the Research Centre ATCH (Architecture Theory Criticism History), University of Queensland in 2009, later becoming a senior research fellow. In 2015 she took up an academic position as Associate Professor at the School of Architecture, University of Queensland. In 2017, Stead joined Monash University's Department of Architecture and was Head of Department from 2018 to 2020. She left Monash early in 2022 to take up a research leadership role at RMIT University, as Director of the Design and Creative Practice Enabling Capability Platform, where her job is to encourage and enable interdisciplinary research that has high impact and benefit to people and planet, between and beyond the design fields.

Stead has also undertaken a number of research fellowships, including Postdoctoral Fellow, Advanced Cultural Studies Institute of Sweden, Linkoping University (October 2007 – February 2008), and Honorary Visiting Scholar, School of Architecture, Catholic University of Leuven, Belgium (June – December 2005). She was visiting fellow in Architectural Theory at TU Delft, the Netherlands, in April 2022.

Stead describes her academic research as engaged with the following areas:

- the history, theory and writing of architectural criticism; experimental writing in architecture;
- representations of architects and architecture in popular media
- the material culture of the architectural workplace; visual sociology in architecture;
- gender equity in architectural practice; feminist architecture theory; women in architecture;
- urban cultural geography and walking as an aesthetic practice; tourist culture in cities
- work-related wellbeing amongst architects and architecture students; work cultures and professional identity in architecture [NS1]
- thing theory, artefactuality, and objecthood in architecture; miniaturisation in architecture;

Stead was a researcher with John Macarthur and Deborah van der Plaat on the project The Cultural Logic of Queensland Architecture: Place, Taste and Economy.

=== Equity and Diversity in the Australian Architecture Profession: women, work and leadership ===
Stead initiated and led the Australian Research Council funded project Equity and Diversity in the Australian Architecture Profession: Women, Work and Leadership (2011–2014). This involved eight researchers – Stead, Karen Burns, Justine Clark, Gill Matthewson, Amanda Roan, Gillian Whitehouse, Julie Willis and Sandra Kaji-O'Grady – and sought map women’s participation in the architectural profession in Australia, to understand why women are under-represented at senior management level, and to identify concrete strategies for change. The project resulted in scholarly publications and the founding of the advocacy group Parlour: women, equity, architecture. This also led to the Parlour Guides to Equitable Practice and the Australian Institute of Architects Gender Equity Policy.

=== Architectural Work Cultures: professional identity, education and wellbeing ===
Stead initiated and leads the Australian Research council funded research project Architectural Work Cultures: Professional identity, education and wellbeing (2020-2023). Known more commonly as the Wellbeing of Architects project, this is a comprehensive, three-year programme of research, bringing together researchers and educators, practices and professional organisations to investigate the wellbeing of people working in and studying architecture. Ultimately the project will develop tailored resources to contribute to greater wellbeing for these groups. This is the first major Australian study to use interdisciplinary, qualitative and quantitative methods to question how workplace cultures and professional identity affect mental wellbeing in architecture – and thus lay the foundations for practical improvements in the future. Collaborators include architecture researchers Maryam Gusheh, Byron Kinnaird and Kirsten Orr, and collaborators from the Monash University Department of Management, Julie Wolfram Cox, Brian Cooper and Tracey Shea.

== Architectural criticism ==
Stead is currently the architecture critic for the Australian national weekly newspaper The Saturday Paper. Her architectural criticism has been published in a wide range of professional journals and magazines, including Architecture Australia, Artichoke, Monument, Architecture Review Australia, Pol Oxygen and [Inside] Australian Design Review. She was a contributing editor to Architecture Australia from 2003 to 2012, architecture columnist for The Conversation in 2016–2017 and is a regular columnist for Places journal. Stead has also written scholarly work on the history and future of architectural criticism and edited the anthology Semi-detached: Writing, representation and criticism in architecture (2012).

== Contributions to public and academic culture ==
Stead contributes to public and academic culture in a range of ways. She was an expert member of the National Committee for Gender Equity of the Australian Institute of Architects. She has edited academic journals, including Culture Unbound: Journal of Current Cultural Research, with Prof Johan Fornas and Dr Martin Fredriksson; Architectural Theory Review, with Dr Lee Stickells and Prof Michael Tawa (2011 – 2014), and was on the Executive Committee of the Society of Architectural Historians of Australia and New Zealand (SAHANZ) from 2003 to 2005, and elected SAHANZ President from 2017-2019.

Stead has also convened and co-convened a number of conferences. These include:

- The Art of Drying: Practices and Aesthetics symposium, University of Queensland Art Museum, 27 March 2015 (with Kelly Greenop and Allison Holland)
- Transform: Altering the Future of Architecture, 30 May 2013 (with Justine Clark and Karen Burns)
- Lost in Conversation: Constructing the Oral History of Modern Architecture, 1 November 2013 (with Janina Gosseye, Naomi Stead and Deborah van der Plaat)
- Writing Architecture II: A Symposium on Innovations in the Textual and Visual Critique of Buildings, Queensland Gallery of Modern Art and the State Library of Queensland, 22–23 July 2010
- Writing Architecture: A Symposium on Architectural Criticism and the Written Representation of Architecture, Institute for Modern Art, Brisbane, 15 & 16 Aug 2009
- Queer Space: Centres and Peripheries a trans-disciplinary international conference on sexuality and space, University of Technology Sydney, February 2007.

Stead also regularly speaks at public and professional events on architecture and the built environment and has done a number of radio interviews.

== Exhibitions ==
Stead has curated a number of architectural exhibitions:

- 2015. Portraits of Practice: At Work in Architecture, Tin Sheds Gallery, Sydney, 11 July- Sept 11, 2015. In collaboration with Justine Clark, Maryam Gusheh, Fiona Young and Gill Matthewson.
- 2015. Hung Out to Dry: Space, memory, and domestic laundry practices, University of Queensland Art Museum, 21 March – 10 May 2015. In collaboration with Allison Holland and Kelly Greenop.
- 2010 Documentation: The Visual Sociology of Architects, at Extra/Ordinary the national conference of the Australian Institute of Architects, Creative Director Melanie Dodds, Sydney, 22–24 April 2010. In collaboration with Dr Sandra Kaji-O’Grady and Dr Kate Sweetapple.
- 2009 Mapping Sydney: Experimental Cartography and the Imagined City, DAB LAB Research gallery UTS Faculty of Design Architecture and Building.

== Selected publications ==
- 2021 Naomi Stead, Tom Lee, Ewan McEoin and Megan Patty, After The Australian Ugliness, National Gallery of Victoria and Thames & Hudson, Melbourne
- 2020 Hélène Frichot and Naomi Stead (eds), Writing Architectures: Ficto-Critical Approaches, Bloomsbury, London
- Stead, Naomi (with Janina Gosseye and Deborah van der Plaat). (2019): Speaking of Buildings. Oral History in Architectural Research. New York, Princeton Architectural Press, 2019, ISBN 9781616897543.
- 2015 Naomi Stead, ‘Lest: In Order Not That,’ Mongrel Rapture: the Work of Ashton Raggatt Macdougall, Uro, Melbourne, 2015.
- 2014 Naomi Stead ed., ‘Dossier’, Architecture Australia, vol 103, no 5, Sept/Oct 2014, pp. 53–69.
- 2014 Naomi Stead ed., Women, Practice, Architecture, Routledge, London, July 2014.
- 2013 Naomi Stead and Cristina Garduno Freeman, ‘Reception,’ Architectural Theory Review, vol 18, no 3, December 2013.
- 2012 Naomi Stead ed., "Resigned Accommodation" and "Usurpatory Strategies", Architectural Theory Review, vol 17 no 2/3, August/December 2012.
- 2012 Naomi Stead ed., Semi-Detached: Writing, Representation and Criticism in Architecture, Uro: Melbourne, May 2012.
- 2011 Naomi Stead, Lee Stickells and Michael Tawa, ‘Fifteen Years of Architectural Theory Review: New Beginnings,’ special issue, Architectural Theory Review, vol 16, issue 2, 2011.
- 2007 Naomi Stead and Jason Prior eds., Proceedings of the international conference Queer Space: Centres and Peripheries, University of Technology Sydney, February 2007
- 2012 John Macarthur & Naomi Stead, ‘Aesthetics/Art/Pleasure’ in Sibel Bozdogan, Stephen Cairns, Greig Crysler and Hilde Heynen eds., Handbook of Architectural Theory, Berg, Oxford, 123-135.
- 2009 Naomi Stead, ‘Avoidance: On Some Euphemisms for the ‘Smallest Room’’ in Olga Gershenson and Barbara Penner eds, Ladies and Gents: Public Toilets and Gender, Temple University Press, Philadelphia, 2009, pp. 126-132.
- 2008 Naomi Stead, ‘Buildings, Photographs, Sculptures: On Medium and Disciplinarity in the work of the Bechers’, in Andrew Leach and John Macarthur eds., Architecture, Disciplinarity and Art, A & S Books, Ghent, pp. 135–149.
- 2007 Naomi Stead, ‘In the Mind of the Architect’: Architecture, Representation and Authorship in Documentary Film’, in Architecture and Authorship, Tim Anstey, Katja Grillner & Rolf Hughes eds., Black Dog Press, London, pp. 50–59.
- 2007 Naomi Stead, ‘Criticism in/and/of Crisis: The Australian Context’, in Jane Rendell, Mark Dorrian et al., eds., Critical Architecture, Routledge, London and New York, pp. 76–83.
- 2007 Naomi Stead, ‘Museological Landscapes, Mythological Lands: The Garden of Australian Dreams’, in Michael J. Ostwald and Steven Fleming eds. Museum, Gallery and Cultural Architecture in Australia, New Zealand and the Pacific Region: Essays on Antipodean Identity, Edwin Mellen Press, Wales, 2007, pp. 69–80.
- 2006 John Macarthur and Naomi Stead, ‘The National Museum of Australia as Danse Macabre: Baroque Allegories of the Popular’, in South Pacific Museums: Beyond the New Museology? Chris Healy and Andrea Witcomb eds., Macquarie University ePress.

== Awards ==
- 2015 Shortlisted for Royal Institute of British Architects (RIBA) President’s Awards for Research, for the Parlour Guides to Equitable Practice, (in collaboration with Justine Clark and others).
- 2015 Adrian Ashton Prize, presented to Parlour: Women, Equity, Architecture, by the New South Wales Chapter of the Australian Institute of Architects (in collaboration with Justine Clark and others).
- 2015 Bates Smart Award for Architecture in the Media (National Award) awarded to Parlour: Women, Equity, Architecture, at the Victorian Architecture Awards, Australian Institute of Architects Victorian Chapter (in collaboration with Justine Clark and others).
- 2015 Shortlisted as Creative Director of the Australian Pavilion at the 2016 Venice Architecture Biennale, for ParlourLIVE!, with Justine Clark, Catherine Griffiths, Maryam Gusheh and Fiona Young.
- 2008 Adrian Ashton Prize for Architectural Writing, presented by the New South Wales Chapter of the Australian Institute of Architects.

== See also ==
- Parlour: women, equity, architecture
