= Hannah Lewi =

Australian architectural historian and educator

Hannah Lewi is an architectural historian and educator at the Melbourne School of Design, University of Melbourne.

== Early life and career ==
Lewi attended the University of Western Australia where she received a B.Architecture (Hons, a B.Arts, and a PhD which was completed in Perth and London. She began her academic career at Curtin University before relocating to Melbourne via London. She has also been a registered architect with the Australian Institute of Architects.

Lewi has been actively involved with the Society of Architectural Historians, Australia and New Zealand (SAHANZ). In 2003, she co-edited Fabrications: Journal of the Society of Architectural Historians, Australia and New Zealand, first alongside Julie Willis and later Deidre Brown. From 2005 to 2007, she served as president of SAHANZ. And has been elecetd as a Life Member. Additionally, Lewi has held leadership roles within Docomomo Australia, serving as both chair and vice chair.

Lewi is a co-director of the Australian Centre for Architectural History, Urban and Cultural Heritage.

== Research and contributions ==
Lewi's research focuses on history, heritage and place, with a particular emphasis on Australian 20th-century architecture and expertise in the history of Western Australian architecture. Her work frequently engages with new media, including the design of digital applications for history and heritage projects.

She co-led an international research project, Citizen Heritage, funded by the Australian Research Council. A key outcome of this project was the co-design and implementation of PastPort, a digital platform for sharing stories and memories.

Lewi served as a historical advisor and contributor to the Australian Architecture exhibition and book at the 2016 Venice Biennale, specifically for The Pool. She has also published numerous articles on the history of swimming pools in Australia.

Lewi was a Chief Investigator on the project Campus: Building Modern Australian Universities, also funded by the Australian Research Council. The project culminated in the publication of a book by the same name in 2023.

Current and recent research projects included the adaptive reuse of historic sites and buildings, the conservation and interpretation of paint and trade literature in Australia in collaboration with Museums Victoria, and historic house museums.

== Selected publications ==
- Lewi, Hannah. 'Paradoxes in the Conservation of Modernism' in Henket, and Heynen. Back from Utopia: The Challenge of the Modern Movement. Rotterdam: 010 Publishers, 2002.
- Lewi, Hannah and Stephen Neille. 'Fading Events and Places: the Architecture of the VII British Empire & Commonwealth Games Village and Perry Lakes Stadium Perth, W.A.: Dept. of Architecture, Curtin University of Technology, 2003.
- Lewi, Hannah 'Designing a virtual museum of digital heritage', in, New Heritage: new media and cultural heritage, Y Kalay, T Kvan and J Affleck (eds), London: Routledge Press, 2007.
- Lewi, Hannah and David. Nichols. 'Community: Building Modern Australia. Sydney: UNSW Press, 2010.
- Lewi, Hannah and Wally Smith. "Hand-held Histories: Using Digital Archival Documents on Architectural Tours." Architectural Research Quarterly 15, no. 1 (2011): 69–77.
- Lewi, H. (2012). "Deranging Oneself in Someone Else’s House". Interstices: Journal of Architecture and Related Arts, 13(13), 85–91.
- Lewi, Hannah 'Back to School: understanding the evidential value of the modern documentary', in The Journal of Architecture, Routledge, Vol 20:2, 193–214., 2015.
- Lewi, Hannah and Cameron Logan, 'A Stimulus for Education: Global Economic Events and the Design of Australian Schools' in Economy and Architecture:, eds J Odgers, M McVikar, S Kite, (eds) London: Routledge, 2015.
- Lewi Hannah, W Smith, A Murray and S Cooke, 'Visitor, Contributor and Conversationalist: multiple digital identities of the heritage citizen', Historic Environment Journal, special issue 'Citizen Heritage', Vol 28: No 2, 2016.
- Lewi, Hannah and A Peckham, "Transcribing The Journal of Architecture: research, representation and publication 2004–2013", The Journal of Architecture, Routledge, 20th anniversary anthology, Vol 21: 4, 479–489, 2016.
- Lewi, Hannah and Andrew Saniga. "Carte Blanche on Campus?" Fabrications 27, no. 3 (2017): 322–51.
- W Smith, H Lewi & D Nichols, 'PastPort: reflections on the design of a mobile application for local history sharing in Port Melbourne', Australian Historical Studies 49, no. 1, 2018.
- Lewi, Hannah 'A Return to the Production of Annotation' in Production Sites: Resituating the Culture of Architectural Knowledge, S Psarra (ed), London: Routledge, 2019.
- Lewi, Hannah and Philip. Goad. Australia Modern: Architecture, Landscape & Design. Port Melbourne, Victoria: Thames & Hudson Australia Pty, 2019.
- Lewi, Hannah and Wally Smith, Steve Cooke and Dirk vom Lehn. The Routledge International Handbook of New Digital Practices in Galleries, Libraries, Archives, Museums and Heritage Sites. Routledge, 2019.
- Various co-authored chapters in Saniga and Freestone (eds.) Campus: Building Modern Australian Universities, UWA Press, 2023.
- Lewi, Hannah and Cameron Logan.ADAPT! Designing New Lives for Old Buildings. URO Books, 2025.
