= Harriet Edquist =

Australian architectural historian and curator

Harriet Edquist AM FAHA
- Awards: Bates Smart National Award for Architecture in the Media

Academic background
- Education: St Catherine's School, Toorak
- Alma mater: Monash University, RMIT University

Academic work
- Institutions: RMIT University

Harriet Edquist AM FAHA is an Australian historian and curator, and professor emerita in the School of Architecture and Urban Design at RMIT University in Melbourne. Born and educated in Melbourne, she has published widely on and created numerous exhibitions in the field of Australian architecture, art and design history. She has also contributed to the production of Australian design knowledge as the founding editor of the RMIT Design Archives Journal and is a member of the Design Research Institute at RMIT University.

== Education ==
Edquist graduated from St Catherine's School, Toorak in 1965. She then studied for a Bachelor of Arts and Master of Arts in classics (1976) from Monash University, and completed a PhD in Architectural History at RMIT University (2000).

== Academic career ==
Edquist began her teaching career as a lecturer in the Department of Fine Arts, University of Melbourne, and specialised in Renaissance and modern art history.

In 1987, she joined RMIT University as editor (with Karen Burns) of Transition: Discourse on Architecture; a quarterly magazine produced by the Department of Architecture from 1979 until 2000 and dedicated to discourse on contemporary architectural practice and theory. Serving from 1987 to 1991, the partnership of Edquist and Karen Burns stretched the critical range of this publication, arguing - as they wrote in their editorial for Transition 38 - that architectural discourse could extend "the boundaries of discussion to include all the arts and observations on the society". They were both subsequently replaced as editors of Transition following a controversial 're-setting' of the publication's agenda, which was played out publicly through editorials and letters.

In 1988, Edquist was appointed lecturer in Architectural History by RMIT University and from 2001 to 2007 served as Head of the School of Architecture and Design. She now holds the position of professor emerita at RMIT University. She was previously the founder and director of the RMIT Design Archives and founding editor of the RMIT Design Archives Journal.

She is currently a member (and was the past President from 2003 to 2005) of SAHANZ, the Society of Architectural Historians Australia and New Zealand. Professor Edquist is also a member of Docomomo Australia.

In June 2015, she became the Foundation President of Automotive Historians Australia. This organisation focusses on Australian automative history and was launched alongside Shifting Gear: Design, Innovation and the Australian car, an exhibition curated by Edquist in conjunction with David Hurlston at the NGV.

== Curated exhibitions ==
- 2015 Shifting Gear: Design, Innovation and the Australian car, NGV Federation Square - with David Hurlston
- 2014 Free, Secular and Democratic: building the Public Library 1853–1913 , State Library of Victoria
- 2013 Frederick Romberg: An Architectural Survey , RMIT Design Archives - with Michael Spooner, Keith Deverell, and Stephen Banham
- 2012 The Lost Modernist. Michael O'Connell, Bendigo Art Gallery - with Tansy Curtin
- 2012 A skilled hand and cultivated mind: a guide to the architecture and art of RMIT University - with Elizabeth Grierson
- 2010-11 The Stony Rises Project, touring exhibition RMIT Gallery and regional Victorian galleries - with Laurene Vaughan and Lisa Byrne
- 2010 The architecture of Neil Clerehan - with Richard Black
- 2002 Kurt Popper, Jewish Museum of Australia
- 2001 Ernest Fooks, Jewish Museum of Australia - with Helen Stuckey
- 2001 Frederick Romberg. An Architecture of Migration 1938-1975, RMIT Gallery and the University of Queensland Gallery - with Helen Stuckey
- 1999 Wolfgang Sievers & Stanhill, RMIT Gallery - with Vanessa Bird
- 1992 The Angelic Space. A Celebration of Piero della Francesca's 500th Anniversary, Monash University Gallery - with Juliana Engberg
- 1991 George Baldessin. An Exhibition of Drawings, Heide Museum of Modern Art
- 1991 Diologhi per una possibile Utopia, Museo Civico Cuneo, Piedmont and Turin Politecnico, Italy - with Karen Burns and Mauro Baracco
- 1991 Companion City, ACCA (Australian Centre of Contemporary Art) - with Karen Burns
- 1989 Robin Boyd: The Architect as Critic, State Library of Victoria - with Karen Burns and Dean Cass

== Selected recent publications * ==
- 2014 'Architecture and design' In: Encyclopedia of Women and Leadership in Twentieth Century, Australian Women's Archives Project 2014, Australia
- 2013 'Frederick Romberg (1913–1992): an architectural survey' In: Frederick Romberg. An Architecture of Migration 1938-1975, Melbourne, Australia - with Spooner, M., Deverell, K., Banham, S., Ashton, K., and Tsolakis, L.
- 2013 Building a new world: a history of the state library of Victoria 1853-1913, State Library of Victoria, Melbourne, Australia
- 2013 '"An architecture to excite an interest": grand visions for Melbourne's public library' In: The La Trobe Journal, 52 - 61
- 2013 'The architectural legacy of the Scots in the western district of Victoria, Australia' In: Architectural Heritage, 24, 67 - 85
- 2011 Michael O'Connell: The Lost Modernist, Melbourne Books, Melbourne, Australia
- 2010 Designing Place: An Archaeology of the Western District, Melbourne Books, Melbourne Australia - with Lisa Byrne and Laurene Vaughan
- 2008 Pioneers of Modernism. The Arts and Crafts Movement in Australia, Miegunyah Press, Melbourne Australia
- 2004 Harold Desbrowe-Annear: a life in architecture, Miegunyah Press, Melbourne, Australia

== Awards and honours ==
In 1992, Edquist was awarded the Bates Smart National Award for Architecture in the Media, for her work editing Transition: Discourse on Architecture. Edquist also shared this role with fellow architecture academic Karen Burns.

In 2004, she was also awarded a Bates Smart National Award for Architecture in the Media, for her work writing the book Harold Desbrowe-Annear: A Life in Architecture.

Edquist was awarded an Honorary Fellow at the Australian Institute of Architects in 2006, for services to architectural education and history. She is also an Honours Committee chair of the Victorian Chapter of the Australian Institute of Architects.

She is a member of the International Confederation of Architectural Museums, and a founding member of its Australian counterpart, icam Australia.

In 2016 Edquist was elected a Fellow of the Australian Academy of the Humanities (FAHA).

Edquist was appointed a Member of the Order of Australia (AM) in the 2020 Australia Day Honours for "significant service to architectural history and design, and to higher education".
