= Gill Matthewson =

New Zealand-Australian architect

Gillian Matthewson
- Born: Gillian Matthewson; New Zealand
- Education: University of Auckland; University of East London; University of Queensland
- Occupation: Architect
- Practice: Claire Chamber Architects; BDP; Matrix

Gill (Gillian) Matthewson is a New Zealand-Australian architect, scholar and educator. Since 2016, she has been based at Monash University in Melbourne, Australia.

== Early life and education ==
Matthewson was born in Wellington, New Zealand, and educated at Tawa College. She received her bachelor's degree in architecture from the University of Auckland, School of Architecture, in New Zealand, followed by a master's degree in architecture from University of East London for a study on the work of Lilly Reich titled "Sex, Lies and the Barcelona Pavilion" (1994). She completed her PhD at the University of Queensland in 2015 on the topic "Dimensions of Gender: Women's Careers in the Australian Architecture Profession", for which she received the Dean's Award for Outstanding Thesis. This was part of a larger research project, Equity and Diversity in the Australian Architectural Profession: women, work and leadership, led by Naomi Stead.

== Research and professional experience ==
A strong advocate of addressing gender discrimination in the field of architecture, Matthewson's scholarship concerns the state of the architectural industry's treatment of women. During her professional life, she has practiced architecture full-time for a decade, including at the firm Claire Chamber Architects (New Zealand), and in England at Matrix Feminist Design Cooperative and BDP. In addition to practicing architecture, Matthewson has contributed to the field as an academic with teaching positions at Wellington Institute of Technology. She undertook her doctoral studies within the ATCH (Architecture Theory Criticism History) Research Centre, in the School of Architecture at the University of Queensland. She joined Monash University Art, Design and Architecture in March 2016, where she is a Lecturer and Senior Researcher at the XYX Lab. She is also a Senior Researcher on the Architecture Education and the Profession study led by the Architects Accreditation Council of Australia which is due to conclude in June 2019.

Matthewson is a co-founder of Parlour: women, equity, architecture, an organisation devoted to advocating for gender equity in architecture, and a co-editor of the Parlour website. Matthewson's extensive statistical map of the participation of women in the architecture profession in Australia has been an important base for Parlour's advocacy. This work has been extended into demographic studies of the Australian architecture profession as a whole, including studies for the Association of Consulting Architects. Her work also informs the reporting undertaken by the Architects Accreditation Council of Australia. She is acknowledged as the national expert on the demographics of the profession.

Matthewson also contributes regular commentary and analysis on contemporary issues in architecture to Parlour and other professional publications, including commentary on the use and misuse of statistics.

Matthewson has long advocated for women in architecture in New Zealand, as an activist, commentator and writer, and has been described by historian Dr Julia Gatley as 'the most persistent commentator to date' on women in New Zealand architecture.

== Published works ==
- "Seeds" – NZ Architect, No 1 1984
- "On Discrimination", co-authored with Heather Ives – NZ Architect, Nov 1985
- "Standing in the Shadows" – Interstices 4 University of Auckland, 1996
- "Looking at the Icons" Formulation Fabrication, Proceedings of the 17th Annual Conference of the Society of Architectural Historians, Australia and New Zealand, edited by Andrew Leach and Emina Petrovic, Wellington, New Zealand, December 2000.
- "Breaking Clichés: the Human Accessory in the Work of Julius Shulman," Hunch: the Berlage Institute Report, no 3, pp. 78–81. Invited article. April 2001.
- "Imaging Utopia: Domestic Frames" In the Making: Architecture’s Past, Proceedings of the 18th Annual Conference of the Society of Architectural Historians, Australia and New Zealand, edited by Kevin Green, Darwin, Australia, September 2001.
- "Pictures of Lilly: Lilly Reich and the role of victim," Additions to Architectural History, Proceedings of the 19th Annual Conference of the Society of Architectural Historians, Australia and New Zealand, edited by John Macarthur and Antony Moulis. Brisbane: SAHANZ, 2002 [cd-rom], 12pp.
- "Pictures of Lilly: erasures, additions and errors" Lilith: A Feminist History Journal 11 (November 2003): 65-77
- "Take it to the Limit: Women as Breach in Architecture." Limits, proceedings of the 21st Annual Conference of the Society of Architectural Historians of Australia and New Zealand, edited by Harriet Edquist & Helene Fichot, Melbourne, October 2004.
- "Sketching in the Margins: women in the architectural profession." Charles Walker (ed) Exquisite Apart: 100 Years of Architecture in New Zealand, Auckland, NZ: Balasoglou Books on behalf of the New Zealand Institute of Architects, 2005. (Invited chapter.)
- Leach, Andrew and Gill Matthewson, eds. Celebration: Proceedings of the 22nd Annual Conference of the Society of Architectural Historians, Australia and New Zealand. Napier: SAHANZ, 2005, 398pp
- "In a Glass Darkly: the Glass Pavilion and reflections in Photographs." In Contested Terrains Proceedings of the 23rd Annual Conference of the Society of Architectural Historians, Australia and New Zealand, edited by T McMinn, J Stephens & S Basson 345-350. Fremantle: SAHANZ, 2006.
- Gill Matthewson and Christine McCarthy, eds. Inhabiting Risk: Proceedings of the 3rd Conference of Interior Design / Interior Architecture Educators Association. Wellington: NZ, 2007, 179pp.
- "People who Live in Glass Houses: Walter Benjamin and the dream of glass architecture." In Cultural Crossroads Proceedings of the 26th Annual Conference of the Society of Architectural Historians, Australia and New Zealand, edited by J Gatley. Auckland: SAHANZ, 2009.
- "You have No Idea: Women in Architecture in the Eighties" in Christine McCarthy (ed) "... ponderous pedantic pediments prevail... good, clean fun in a bad, dirty world": New Zealand Architecture in the 1980s, Centre for Building Performance Research, Faculty of Architecture and Design, Victoria University, pp 57–6, 2009
- "House Work: women and the Group" and "Houses for Modern Homes Inc" in Julia Gatley (ed) Group Architects: towards a New Zealand Architecture, Auckland: Auckland University Press, 2010. 6pp & 5pp. (Invited chapters.)
- "Suburban Imaginings: the Rotherham House Stories" in Imagining... Proceedings of the 27th Annual Conference of the Society of Architectural Historians, Australia and New Zealand, edited by Michael Chapman and Michael Ostwald. Newcastle: SAHANZ, 2010. pp 253–257.
- "Architect Barbie Through the Looking Glass: gender, identity and architecture" in Fabulation: Myth, Nature, Proceedings of the 29th Annual SAHANZ conference, edited by Stuart King, Anuradha Chatterjee and Stephen Loo Launceston: SAHANZ, 2012.
- "Nothing Else Will Do: the call for gender equality in architecture in Britain" Architectural Theory Review, 17, 2-3, 2012
- "Women and Leadership in the Australian Architectural Profession: Prelude to a Research Project" co-authored with Naomi Stead and Karen Burns, in Rosemary Francis, Patricia Grimshaw and Ann Standish eds. Seizing the initiative: Australian women leaders in politics, workplaces and communities Melbourne: eScholarship Research Centre, The University of Melbourne, 2012.
- "Women in Architecture: who counts?" Architecture Now, 5 Nov 2014
- Matthewson, G. (2017). The gendered attrition of architects in Australia. ARQ: Architectural Research Quarterly, 21(2), 171-182. https://doi.org/10.1017/S1359135517000367
- Stead, N., Matthewson, G., Clark, J., & Burns, K. (2017). Parlour: The First Five Years. Field, 7(1), 143 - 160.
- Matthewson, G. (2018). Where Do You Go To?: The Class of ’76. Interstices: Journal of Architecture and Related Arts, 85-100. http://interstices.aut.ac.nz/ijara/index.php/ijara/article/viewFile/270/454
- Tanner, S., Kalms, N., Cull, H., Matthewson, G., & Aisenberg, A. (2020). 'Unsafe in the City' - SM - 'Disruption and Design: Crowdmapping Young Women’s Experience in Cities'. IDS Bulletin, 51(2), 113-128. https://doi.org/10.19088/1968-2020.133
- Ison, J., & Matthewson, G. (2023). More than a dot point: Connecting primary prevention of violence against women and public transport. Journal of Transport & Health, 30, [101591]. https://doi.org/10.1016/j.jth.2023.101591
