= Hybrid Artworks =

Interdisciplinary research and performance art cooperative

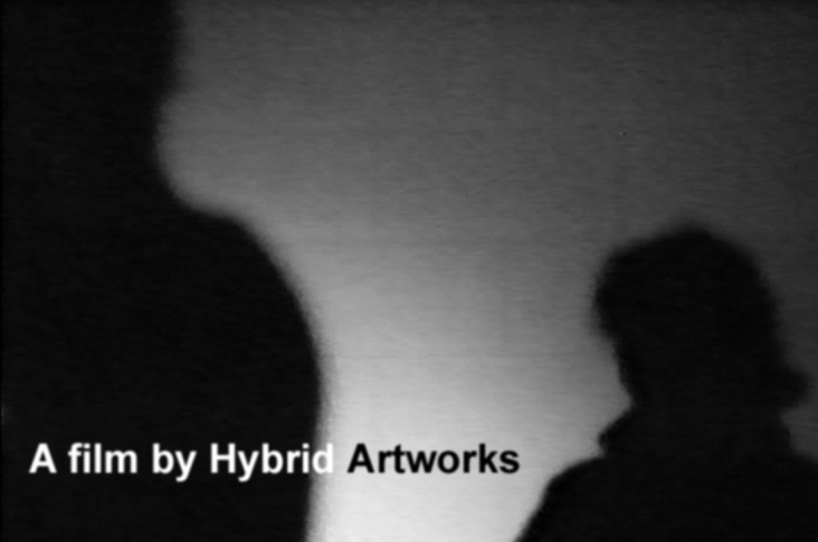
- Hybrid Artworks: multi-media collaborative art group, UK

Background information
- Years active: 1995–1999
- Members: Director; Graham Cairns; Associates; George Crockford, Marc Wongsam

Hybrid Artworks is an interdisciplinary research and performance art cooperative originally based in Hull, UK. It was established in 1995 and produced pieces of performance art, video installation theatre, texts and essays.

== Description ==
It was funded on a project by project basis by local arts councils and grants and supported by the University of Lincolnshire and Humberside. It produced pieces for literature, music and theatre festivals and academic research projects. It was composed of a number of permanent and temporary members and was disbanded in 1999. Their work continues to be documented in both the UK and Spain where its members remain active in using the group's spatial theories in various workshops on the video installation and architecture. These workshops have involved architects, filmmakers and graphic designers and have been documented in articles in South Africa, Spain and the UK.

Its deliberately cross disciplinary format meant it collaborated with academics, actors, musicians, dancers, sound artists, video artists, film makers and theatre directors in a range of art, music and literature festivals including; Hull Jazz Festival, Hull Literature Festival and Lincolnshire Arts Festival.

Their work was dealt with in a documentary made in 1999, and was subject to extensive analysis in the 2007 international publication El arquitecto detrás de la cámara – una visión especial del cine, Abada Editores, Spain. It is also covered in the forthcoming 2013 book The Architecture of the Screen: essays in cinematographic space, Intellect Books, UK. Readings of their performance texts and poetry were recorded and aired in two BBC Radio Humberside interviews and an experimental sound piece funded by Yorkshire and Humberside Arts was made with BBC Radio Manchester in 1998.

== Initial projects ==
Initially concerned with applying the lessons of cinema to architecture through filming urban settings, the first informal projects of Hybrid Artworks were simple single track video films. In part based on the idea that cinema has been a natural testing ground for architects examining alternative approaches to their discipline, these films used camera angles, movement, composition, framing, depth of field and illumination to “defamiliarise” the usual visual understanding of the space presented on screen. Later, this cinematographic take on architecture was applied to the more spatially orientated phenomenon of installation, leading to the creation of pieces that considered both physical and cinematographic characteristics in an intrinsically linked and mutual way. They were referred to as spatial experiments in video installation. As a technical derivative of cinema, video installation was seen as a way to collapse the distanced relationship between filmic image and physical space.

== Later projects ==
Behind Bars was a theatre piece performed as part of Hull Literature Festival 1997. A series of three related poems performed by a single actor it involved a soundscape and video projection to create the scenic space. It was performed in Hull Truck Theatre. Riot is Paradigm was another project performed as part of the same festival. Involving a collaboration with dancers, sound and video artists it was a multi media piece performed in the Ferens Art Gallery, Hull and described as a 'cinematic experiment in our perception of space'. In both these projects the idea of developing a ‘hybrid’ space through the use of video in conventional theatrical and gallery settings was a development of the ideas first implemented in single stream video films and their large scale projection as installations. In Behind Bars and Riot is Paradigm Hybrid Artworks continued with the incursion of installation into conventional settings but also added an element of ‘live performance’; a feature considered typical of installation and performance. In both cases, actors performed live alongside the projected image. In this regard the precedents used by Hybrid Artworks were multiple and included groups and artists like Bill Viola, Bruce Nauman, Gary Hill and Dan Graham, to name but a few. From a more performance and video background Hybrid Artworks referenced the work of Station House Opera as an important influence.

== Incidental Legacy ==
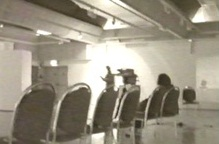
Rehearsal images. Reprojected during performances to create a sense of memory

Each of the projects realised by Hybrid Artworks were funded on a project-by-project basis by a series of Arts funding boards. Incidental Legacy was jointly funded with support from Hull Jazz Festival, 1998 and Lincolnshire and Humberside Arts. The second part of the overall project was funded as part of Hull Literature Festival. It was composed of three separate performances of the same basic script held in the same gallery space. The performances were spread out over a one-year period. It was based on the interplay of three principal components: i) the script and its performance, ii), the gallery space and its plan layout and iii) a multitude of recorded material of which film was of central importance. The key theoretical texts identified by Hybrid Artworks as underlying this piece were those of Umberto Eco. The "script" was conceived as a series of independent but interrelated poems written for two voices. Read in an alternating sequence by two actors, it was composed into what has been called a lineal narrative that deals with the ambiguous nature of memory. Following this script, the two actors continually repeated and re-used the same words and images in different contexts. Continuously placing the events retold in conflicting and contradictory perspectives, this narrative strategy was intended to instigate multiple different interpretations of the same basic text. The fragmentary and semi post-structural logic behind this narrative structure was repeated in the treatment of the gallery space used. In this case, The European Illustration Collection Gallery, Kingston upon Hull. The way in which screens, seating, projected images and actor positions were organised in gallery space was intended to ensure that multiple and different associations between text, action and image were continually elicited. The intention behind this has been explained as "making space active in plot construction".

Initially the projections used in the piece were standard photographic or filmic images cast onto walls or independent partitioning screens. As the piece developed, however, the intention was to use projected filmic imagery to manipulate the “perceptual experience of the space”. Employing a technique of filming images in the space and then re-projecting those same images back into the space, the effect has been called “the blurring of our understanding of the physical and the mediated”.

Shadows: Performed initially as part of a music festival in August 1998, Shadows was the first of the three performances that made up the entire Incidental Legacy project. In this piece the audience was seated and the actors were free to move around the gallery setting. The video projection was composed of material filmed during the rehearsals and, thus, presented the audience with images of the actors practising their dialogue in the gallery itself.

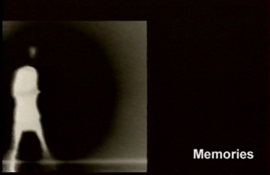
Still image from Experimentations in Space-a documentary film

Memories: The second performance of the project was performed some months after the first one and formed part of an annual literature festival. It differed from its predecessor in two principal ways. Firstly, the seating was completely removed from the gallery and the actors were generally restricted to set corners of the space; an arrangement that allowed the audience to move completely freely around the gallery. Secondly, there was a greater use of videoed material as filmed images of Performance 1, Shadows, were projected during this second presentation. The result was described as twofold; the piece was interpreted more as performance art than standard theatre and its narrative reading became more complex as more visual references were overlaid.

Echoes: The final “performance” involved the complete elimination of live acting and relied totally on the pre-recorded material accumulated throughout the previous performances. Given this independence from physical action, it represented the culmination of a project that had moved from the realm of theatre, passed through the field of performance art, and finally positioned itself completely within the theoretical framework of video installation. It was an evolutionary process intended to echo Kate Murdoch’s definition of the three-part typology of the screen viewing experience offered in a historical context by Lev Manovich in The Language of New Media. As had occurred previously, Performance 2, had been filmed using a continuously running camera and this material was layered on top of the earlier material in Performance 3, Echoes. In this final presentation there was now the initial photographed imagery of the space, the videoed footage of the rehearsals, the continuous end wall projections of Performance 1 and another simultaneous presentation of Performance 2 that was played through a TV monitor in the corner of the space.

== Documentation ==
In 1999 a 12-minute documentary film was released by Hybrid Artworks outlining their works and the theories underlying them. In 2007 some of their work was documented in a book on architecture and its relationship with film and the moving image: El arquitecto detrás de la cámara – una visión especial del cine. Abada Editors, Madrid. It has also been covered in conferences, academic papers, magazine articles, workshops in several countries. It is also covered in The Architecture of the Screen: essays in cinematographic space, Intellect Books, Bristol, 2013.

== People ==
The three principal members of Hybrid Artworks were: Graham Cairns, George Crockford and Marc Wongsam. Various projects involved collaborations with: Nik Prescott, Scott Bryson, Danny Phelps, Noel McConville, Rob McGrath, Diane Dubois, Jes and Sue White, Simon Galbraith, Lucy Strutt, Andrea Taylor, Sal Doxey and John Simms.
