= Parlour: women, equity, architecture =

Australian professional organisation advocating for women in architecture

Parlour: women, equity, architecture is an organisation founded in 2012 as an advocacy group for gender equity in the architecture industry based in Australia. Part of the work of Parlour is to undertake research producing both quantitative and qualitative findings and to generating debate to expand 'the spaces for women in Australian architecture'.

Parlour has an editor and curator, currently Justine Clark. Co-editors include Naomi Stead, Karen Burns, Sandra Kaji-O’Grady, Julie Willis, Amanda Roan and Gill Matthewson.

== History ==
Parlour came from a research grant funded by the Australian Research Council with the launching of a website in 2012. The research was led by Naomi Stead (University of Queensland) was called Equity and Diversity in the Australian Architecture Profession: Women, Work and Leadership. Assisting were academics from the University of Melbourne, Justine Clark, Karen Burns and Julie Willis, the University of Queensland, Gill Matthewson, Amanda Roan and Gillian Whitehouse the University of Sydney, Sandra Kaji-O'Grady and the Queensland University of Technology, Susan Savage. Industry partners also supporting this research were the Australian Institute of Architects, Architecture Media, Bates Smart, BVN and PTW Architects.

The founders of Parlour were Justine Clark, Gill Matthewson, Naomi Stead, Susie Ashworth, Karen Burns and Julie Willis. After the launch of the website it received over 17,000 unique browser visits in just the first three months. In 2019 there were some changes in people with Burns leaving and Alison Cleary and Susie Ashworth joining. Alison McFadyen joined in 2022.

Parlour became an organisation in 2015.

== Organisation ==
Parlour is an Incorporated Association with five aims that include the promotion of gender equity in architecture, education and advocacy programs and resources based in research, discussion, research and informed publishing of information and opinion and to celebrate and profile women working in architecture and built environment professions. As part of being an Incorporated Association there is a president (Justine Clark), vice president (Naomi Stead), secretary (Alison McFadyen), treasurer (Gill Matthewson) and committee members (Susie Ashworth, Julie Willis, Alison Cleary and Sarah Lynn Rees).

From 2019 – 2021 Parlour was sponsored by Association of Architecture Schools of Australasia (AASA).

== Activities ==
Since the inception there has been a Parlour website edited by Susie Ashworth and Justine Clark. It has a legacy built in with the National Library of Australia archiving the website. In 2015 Parlour commenced a project to improve the representation of women architects and designers in Wikipedia, culminating in nomination for the 2019 Beazley Designs of the Year, and inspiring similar advocacy activity in the UK by Part W.

Parlour uses social media to connect and promote. There have been several ongoing series including Deadly Djurumin, Parlour LAB, and the Reading Room. Since October 2016 Parlour has run 'Seasonal Salons' around Australia including Melbourne, Sydney, Brisbane, Hobart, Perth and Adelaide which are hosted and curated conversations between women 'in architecture about life, work and issues of the built environment' for members and the wider community. In 2023 Parlour turned the Salons into a podcast series.

Light at the end of the Tunnel is another series set-up by Parlour as a response to COVID-19, and another one is Path Ahead about how to navigate an economic downturn.

Parlour has published Parlour Guides to Equitable Practice, resources for architectural firms. Part of the drive behind creating these guides is the fact that although half of Australian architecture graduates are women only one in five registered architects are.

Justine Clark said of the guides:

This work is unusual in its detailed attention to the mechanisms of the architectural workplace, and in its ambition to activate research findings as part of an explicit program for change within the profession (Justine Clark).

Research work is an activity of Parlour. The Work and Wellbeing survey started in 2021 with over 2000 responses. It was worked on by worked on by research assistant, Anwyn Hocking and data-cruncher Gill Matthewson.

In 2022 as part of the ten year anniversary, Parlour launched a supporter network called Parlour Collective.

== Awards ==
Australian Institute of Architects’ Victorian Architecture Awards - National Bates Smart Award for Architecture in the Media (2015) (winner) - Parlour Guidelines to Equitable Practice

Royal Institute of British Architects (RIBA) - Outstanding University-located Research category of the President's Awards for Research (2015) (shortlisted)
