= Davina Jackson =

Writer and editor

Davina Gainor Jackson is a Sydney based international writer and editor of books and websites promoting satellite technologies for urban development and recording pan-Pacific architectural and maritime history. She is a fellow of the Royal Society of Arts and the Royal Society of New South Wales.

== Biography ==
Jackson is from New Zealand and received her undergraduate degree in 1971 after studying political history and economics at Auckland University in 1973. In 1997 she was awarded a University of New South Wales M.Arch degree in architectural history and theory with a thesis that examined the internet-era implications for pre-internet theories about the history and future of domestic living and architecture. Jackson earned her Ph.D. by publications from the University of Kent School of Architecture in 2017.

Jackson was the editor of Architecture Australia from 1993 until 2000. From 2002–2005, Jackson chaired the Venice Architecture Biennale Task Force, which sought funding from the Australian council to support the participation of Australians in the Venice Biennale. In 2005 she was named an associate professor at the University of New South Wales.

Jackson is known for her work on architecture in Australia, knowledge she conveys through a series of books on architecture and through directing annual city light festivals in Sydney (Vivid Sydney/Smart Light Sydney 2009) and Singapore (iLight Marina Bay 2010, 2012). Her books on architecture have been reviewed by multiple publications.

== Selected publications ==
- SuperLux : smart light art, design and architecture for cities. Davina Jackson, Mary-Anne Kryiakou, Vesna Petresin, Thomas Schielke, Peter Weibel, Peter Droege. New York, New York. 2015. ISBN 978-0-500-34304-3. OCLC 917376003.
- Goodchild, Michael F.; Guo, Huadong; Annoni, Alessandro; Bian, Ling; de Bie, Kees; Campbell, Frederick; Craglia, Max; Ehlers, Manfred; van Genderen, John; Jackson, Davina; Lewis, Anthony J.; Pesaresi, Martino; Remetey-Fülöpp, Gábor; Simpson, Richard; Skidmore, Andrew; Wang, Changlin; Woodgate, Peter (21 June 2012). "Next-generation Digital Earth". Proceedings of the National Academy of Sciences. 109 (28): 11088–11094. Bibcode:2012PNAS..10911088G. doi:10.1073/pnas.1202383109. ISSN 0027-8424. PMC 3396470. PMID 22723346.
- Craglia, Max; de Bie, Kees; Jackson, Davina; Pesaresi, Martino; Remetey-Fülöpp, Gábor; Wang, Changlin; Annoni, Alessandro; Bian, Ling; Campbell, Fred; Ehlers, Manfred; van Genderen, John; Goodchild, Michael; Guo, Huadong; Lewis, Anthony; Simpson, Richard; Skidmore, Andrew; Woodgate, Peter (1 January 2012). "Digital Earth 2020: towards the vision for the next decade". International Journal of Digital Earth. 5 (1): 4–21. Bibcode:2012IJDE....5....4C. doi:10.1080/17538947.2011.638500. ISSN 1753-8947. S2CID 1196061.
- Jackson, Davina. Data Cities: How Satellites are Transforming Architecture and Design. London: Lund Humphries, 2018. ISBN 978 1 84822 274 8.
- Jackson, Davina (2022). Australian Architecture : A history. Crows Nest, NSW: Allen & Unwin. ISBN 9781760878399.
- Jackson, Davina (2002). Australian architecture now. London: Thames & Hudson. ISBN 9780500283882.

== Awards and honors ==
In 2007 Jackson was named a fellow of the Royal Society of Arts. In 2016 she was named an honorary life member of the International Society for Digital Earth, and in 2018 she was named an honorary academic by Kent School of Architecture at the University of Kent. In 2020 she was named a fellow of the Royal Society of New South Wales (2020).
