= Architecture Media Politics Society =

ArchitectureMPS
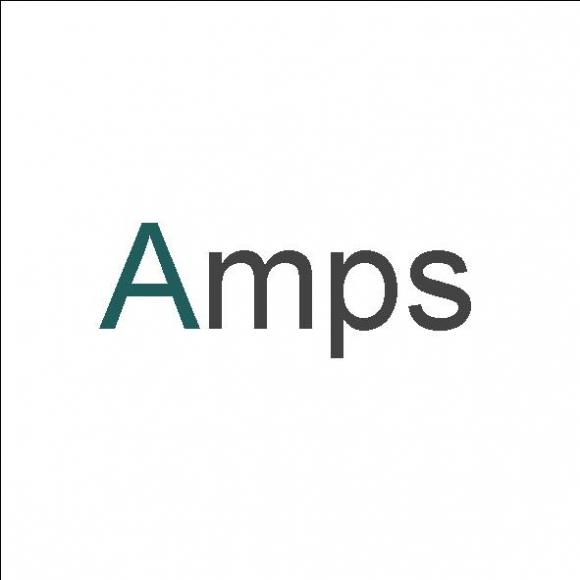
- Director: Graham Cairns
- Categories: Architecture
- Frequency: Monthly
- Publisher: UCL Press
- Country: United Kingdom
- Language: Primary: English Secondary: Various
- Website: www.architecturemps.com
- ISSN: 2050-9006

Architecture Media Politics Society (AMPS) is a nonprofit academic research organisation. Its associated peer reviewed open access online journal is Architecture_MPS ISSN 2050-9006. It was set up in 2011 and the journal officially launched in 2012. Since 2015 it has been published by UCL Press. It is dedicated primarily to the study of architecture but examines it in the context of what it refers to as the mediated environment of contemporary culture.

It was set up after a research bid to the Arts and Humanities Research Council, AHRC, for the project it hosted between 2012 and 2014; "Architecture as Political Image". It is an independent organisation that runs its research programmes in collaboration with multiple universities. It is based the United Kingdom.

== Research Programmes ==
In 2014 AMPS launched a research programme called The Mediated City. Investigating the role and influence of new technologies of the use, experience and representation of ‘the city’ it involves conferences and publications. The first two conferences were held in London and Los Angeles in 2014. In 2016 three books were published related to the programme: The publisher is Intellect Books. the series is called 'Mediated Cities'.

In 2015 AMPS launched a three-year programme examining affordable housing provision internationally involving collaborations with universities, art groups, resident associations and scholars. It involves projects in several countries. The programme is called Housing - Critical Futures. It involves conferences in the UK, Spain, Cyprus, Australia, China and elsewhere. The publishers engaged in this program are UCL Press and Libri Publishing.

== Journal ==
The Architecture_MPS journal publishes eight articles per year. It has an associated resource repository discussed on academic forums such as Humanities and Social Sciences online and the Joint Information Systems Committee.

The journal's subject areas and interests are open and encompass a range of subjects related to architecture. The themes of architecture, media, politics and society are interpreted broadly but the principal aim has been described as encouraging an “examination of how architecture operates in tandem with other cultural factors”. Articles about urban design, cultural conflict in cities and the use of architecture in political campaigns in the United States. They sit alongside articles about the use of modernist architecture as a political tool in post revolutionary Mexico and the 'political role' of the built environment in the 'cultural industries' in the UK. It has an international perspective and a global editorial team. Its combination of journal and resource repository and its association with information professionals has been labeled as an “innovative” and “new” approach to academic publishing. The journal also publishes a range of interviews with leading academics, architects and critics.

== Hosted projects ==
The journal periodically hosts a research project from a given scholar. In 2012 that project was entitled “Architecture as Political Image” and investigated the appropriation of architecture in political campaign imagery in the United States and the United Kingdom.

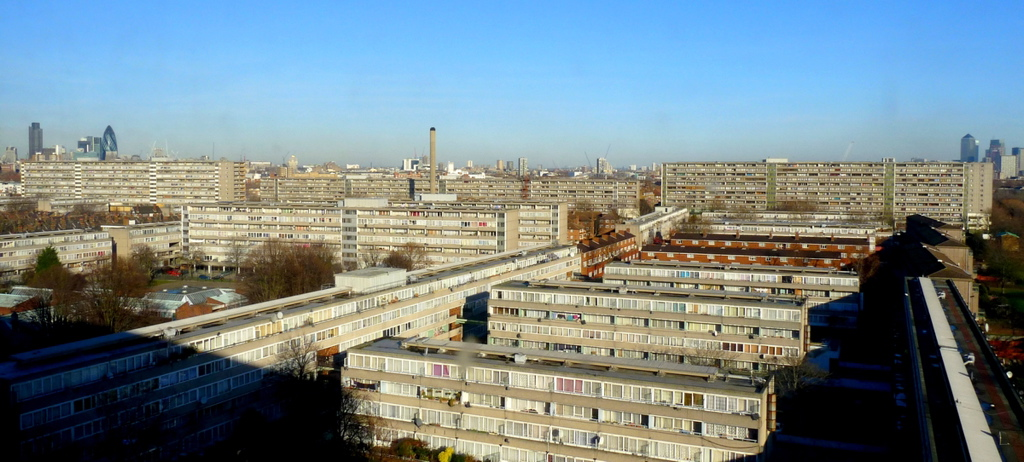
The Aylesbury Housing Estate, Walworth, South East London UK, 51.486°N 0.085°W.

This project has been covered at various academic conferences including the 2011 Oxford University Visual Literacies conference and has been the subject of numerous book articles. It uses a 3 part model to analyse the relationship between politics, advertising and architecture. It underlines the argument that the strategies used in political communication emerged from the PR and advertising industries and, as a result, the political use of architectural imagery is similar to that found in commercial promotion. In this light, politics and architecture are seen as intertwined with what the project defines as a game of images. The project outlines a historical narrative that traces this appropriation of architectural imagery back to the 18th century but primarily examines Post World War II elections in the US and the UK. These elections are examined alongside the most recent elections; the Barack Obama presidential campaign, 2008, the 2010 United Kingdom general election and the United States elections, 2012.

== Resource repository ==
The Resource Repository of AMPS operates as a forum and source for researchers and information professionals in the fields related to the built environment primarily. It is hosted on the organisation's webpage and through social media. It involves a collaboration between academics and information professionals. It is characterised by a number of features:

1. Website Index The repository has an archive of current and past websites dealing with issues related to journal's host project.

2. Current Listings It provides a list of current events relevant to both academics and researchers, information specialists: exhibitions, conferences etc.

3. Research Guide A bibliographic source with listings of books and articles related to journal's host project.

== Editorial policy ==
All articles published in the journal are subject to double-blind peer review. It is open access and uses the Budapest Open Access Initiative (BOAI) definition of open access.
