= Part W =

Women advocacy group

Part W is a British collective of women working in architecture, design, infrastructure and construction, challenging systems that disadvantage women, and calling for gender mainstreaming in the built environment. The collective was founded by Zoë Berman in 2018 and is co-chaired by Alice Brownfield. The group is multidisciplinary, including architects, journalists, academics and clients. There are around 12 core members and all projects feature an element of crowdsourcing.

Part W was awarded the inaugural Prize for Research into Gender and Architecture at the 2023 W Awards for 'Women's Work' - a map highlighting the work of women across London.

== Projects ==
The Alternative List (2019) was the collective's first project, aiming to highlight how at the time the Royal Institute of British Architects Royal Gold Medal had 165 male winners, but only one woman (Zaha Hadid) and three male-female partnerships winners. The collective crowdsourced names to create an 'Alternative List' of women who could have been nominated. The Royal Gold Medal for Architecture was subsequently granted to Yvonne Farrell and Shelley McNamara in 2020.

Wiki edit-a-thon (2020) was a one-day Wikipedia edit-a-thon at the Design Museum, London with Professor Mel Dodd and was inspired by the work of Parlour: women, equity, architecture. The workshop supported people to develop the digital profiles of women architects and designers who are missing online, or whose articles do not reflect their achievements.

Women's Work (2023) aimed to highlight systematic erasure of women's contributions to the built environment by mapping London projects built or significantly contributed to by women. An initial map of 20 projects was created and featured in the Barbican exhibition How We Live Now: Reimagining Spaces with the Matrix Feminist Design Co-operative. The 2023 map was designed to encourage individuals, school groups and higher education groups to explore the city and discuss its architecture. The map was designed by EDIT and captured 30 projects, selected from a list of 150 crowdsourced projects.

Built Barriers (2025) Part W launched Built Barriers, a campaign documenting design features that create barriers to accessibility, inclusion and safety, particularly for women. The project crowdsources photographs to create a visual archive of barriers in the built environment.
