= Graham Cairns =

Graham Cairns (born 1971, UK) is an author and academic. He is the founder and director of the research organization AMPS Architecture Media Politics Society. He is Executive Editor of its associated peer-reviewed scholarly journal Architecture_MPS, ISSN 2050-9006, published by UCL Press. He researches and publishes on architecture and its relationship with visual culture and socio-politics. He has delivered talks, taught, run workshops, and held various positions at universities internationally.

== Biography ==
Cairns studied architecture at Liverpool John Moores University and the University of Lincoln. His doctorate examined the relationship between advertising and commercial architecture and was awarded by the Superior Technical School of Architecture of Madrid. It was later developed into a book, Deciphering Art, Architecture and Advertising: Selling to the Sophisticated Consumer. In 1995, he founded and ran the UK-based performance arts company Hybrid Artworks, specializing in spatial installation and multimedia performance. He lived in Spain between 2000-2005 and published his first book in Spanish: El Arquitecto Detrás de la Cámara: Una Visión Espacial del Cine. In 2011, he founded the research organisation Architecture Media Politics Society and its associated journal. In this role, he has organised academic conferences internationally with events in the UK, the US, Spain, Cyprus, and Australia. Examples include the 2014 events in both London and Los Angeles. He has also developed the 'interview article' as a form of academic publication Interview articles have been published by authors such as Noam Chomsky , Kenneth Frampton , Daniel Libeskind and Michael Sorkin He has also established a resource repository as part of a collaboration between librarians and academics. He is the author and editor of seven published books on architecture, design, film, and advertising. He has published in English and Spanish and his work has also been translated to French.

== Research ==
Cairns has two areas of research: i) Architecture in its socio-cultural context; ii) Architecture and Visual Culture. Through AMPS, he runs two research and publication programs that align with these areas of expertise. Housing – Critical Futures is a three year long programme of conferences, publications, and workshops operating over ten countries. It was launched in 2015. The Mediated City is a programme launched in 2014 that examines the role of technologies and media on urban design, experience, and living. As part of these research programmes, he has initiated book series with Intellect Books, Bristol; Libri Publishing, Oxfordshire; and UCL Press, London.

== Publications ==
- Reification and Representation - Architecture in the Politico-Media-Complex. 2019. Routledge / Taylor&Francis: London.ISBN 9780367532253.
- Visioning Technologies – the architectures of sight. 2016. Routledge / Taylor&Francis: London. ISBN 978-1-4724-5496-6.
- Reflections on Architecture, Society and Politics– Socio Cultural Tectonics in the 21st Century. 2016. Routledge / Taylor&Francis: London. ISBN 978-1-4724-5608-3.
- Design for a Complex World – challenges in practice and education. 2014. Libri Publishing: London. ISBN 978-1-907471-65-0.
- The Architecture of the Screen: Essays in Cinematographic Space. 2013. Intellect Books: Bristol. ISBN 978-1-84150-711-8.
- Reinventing Architecture and Interiors - A Socio-Political View on Building Adaptation. 2013. Libri Publishing: London. ISBN 978-1-907471-64-3.
- Deciphering Art, Architecture, and Advertising: Selling to the Sophisticated Consumer. 2010. Libri Publishing: London. ISBN 978-1-907471-15-5.
- El Arquitecto Detrás de la Cámara: Una Visión Espacial del Cine. 2007. Abada Editores: Madrid. ISBN 978-8496-258-90-7.
