= Sandra Kaji-O'Grady =

Sandra Kaji-O'Grady is an Australian architectural academic and educator based in Brisbane. She was Professor of Architecture, Dean and Head of the School of Architecture at the University of Queensland until 2018.

== Career ==
Sandra Kaji-O'Grady has played an extensive role in architectural academia and tertiary education in Australia. She was Head of School at University of Technology Sydney (2005–2009), Professor and Head of Discipline at the University of Sydney (2011) and was Professor, Head of School and Dean of Architecture at the University of Queensland (2013–18). She left the University of Queensland in December 2020. She currently sits on the editorial boards of Architecture and Culture, Studies in Material Thinking and Architecture Theory Review.

Kaji-O'Grady resigned as Head of School from the University of Sydney "after the dean of architecture, design and planning, John Redmond, sent letters to more than 100 students at other universities guaranteeing them a place if they switched preferences to Sydney University – contravening anti-solicitation rules." Almost the entire department supported her in demanding the dean's resignation.

Kaji-O'Grady co-directed, with architect John de Manincor, the 2013 National Conference of the Australian Institute of Architects. The conference, entitled Material, explored architecture's embrace of new materials and "expand the discourse on materiality beyond phenomena and affect to explore political, environmental and technological concerns." Kaji-O'Grady and De Manincor assembled a diverse assemblage of speakers, "from Matthias Kohler's research into robotics, to Kathrin Aste's sublime interventions in steel and concrete, to Cesare Peeren's radical approach to upcycling." The 2013 conference was also notable for ensuring a gender-balance in speakers at the architecture conference. Kaji-O'Grady writes that her co-director John de Manincor constructed a colourful spreadsheet that allowed them "to organize potential speakers according to material sub-theme, nationality and geographical reach of projects, scale of practice and, of course, gender."

== Research ==
Sandra Kaji-O'Grady's research interests include contemporary laboratory buildings and the cross-fertilization between architecture, science and art in the 1960s and 1970s.

She was also part of the Australian Research Council-funded research project Equity and Diversity in the Australian Architecture Profession: Women, Work, and Leadership, led by Naomi Stead of the University of Queensland. One outcome of this research is publishing platform Parlour, which "brings together research, informed opinion and resources on women, equity and architecture in Australia." Kaji-O'Grady writes that the "project began with the observation that while women are statistically more likely to leave the profession and significantly less likely to reach the upper echelons of architectural practice than men, there was wildly divergent representation of women across different practices." Sandra Kaji-O'Grady, as part of Parlour, has made a significant impact on the Australian architectural profession by providing "employers, employees and industry bodies with a tool kit for addressing inequity in the workplace," such as the informal promotion system that tends to favour males.

Kaji-O'Grady is a member of the ATCH (Architecture Theory Criticism History) Research Centre, at the University of Queensland.

== Writing ==
Kaji-O'Grady has written extensively for both academic and popular journals, including The Journal of Architecture, Journal of Architectural Education, Architecture Theory Review, Architecture Australia, Architectural Review Australia, Artichoke, Object Magazine and Monument. She made a significant contribution to Australian architectural theory in the publication Conditions, Connections and Change: Reviewing Australian Architectural Theory 1880–2000, which she co-authored with Julie Willis. It employs "a chronological range to review the field of Australian architectural theory between 1880 and 2000." With Chris L. Smith and Russell Hughes, she coedited the book Laboratory Lifestyles: The Construction of Scientific Fictions (2019) and coauthored (with Chris L. Smith) the book LabOratory: Speaking of Science and Its Architecture(2019).

== Publications ==
- Kaji-O'Grady, Sandra (2009). Public art and audience reception: theatricality and fiction. In Steffen Lehman (Ed.), Back to the city. Strategies for informal urban design: collaboration between artists and architects (pp. 108–113) Ostfildern, Germany: Hatje Cantz.
- Kaji-O'Grady, Sandra (2011). Seriature. In Dorian Wiszniewski (Ed.), Architecture and series (pp. 6–9) Edinburgh, United Kingdom: Architecture, School of Arts Culture and Environment, University of Edinburgh.
- Kaji-O'Grady, Sandra (2011). Colour Block. Monument, Dec 2011/Jan 2012 Issue 106, (pp. 34 – 41). Melbourne, Australia: The Pacific Plus Company.
- Kaji-O'Grady, Sandra, Willis, Julie (2011). Conditions, Connections and Change: Reviewing Australian Architectural Theory 1880– 2000. Architectural Theory Review, 16(2), 92–102.
- Kaji-O'Grady, Sandra (2012). Champions of change: observations from research. Architecture Bulletin, (pp. 10 – 11). Sydney, Australia: Royal Australian Institute of Architects New South Wales Chapter.
- Kaji-O'Grady, Sandra (2012). Formalism and forms of practice. In C. Greig Crysler, Stephen Cairns and Hilde Heynen (Ed.), The SAGE Handbook of Architectural Theory (pp. 152–165) London, United Kingdom: Sage Publications.
- Kaji-O'Grady, Sandra and Smitheram, J. (2012). Critical Utopia: Site of Reversible Density, Yoro. In Hilde Heynen, Jean-Louis Genard and Tahl Kaminer (Ed.), Critical tools : International colloquium on architecture and cities #3 (pp. 115–126) Bruxelles, Belgium: La Lettre Volee.
- Kaji-O'Grady, Sandra (2014). Laboratories of experimental science. In Mathew Aitchison (Ed.), The architecture of industry: changing paradigms in industrial building and planning (pp. 109–134) Farnham, Surrey, United Kingdom: Ashgate Publishing.
- Kaji-O'Grady, Sandra (2014). From Monopoly to Jean Nouvel’s Serpentine Pavilion: Monochromatic Buildings and Rooms. Architecture Theory Review, 19(2), (pp. 141 – 153).
- Kaji-O’Grady, Sandra and Chris L. Smith (2014). Exaptive Translations between Biology and Architecture. Architecture Research Quarterly, 18(2), (pp. 155 – 166).
