= Jos Boys =

Architect, journalist and design activist

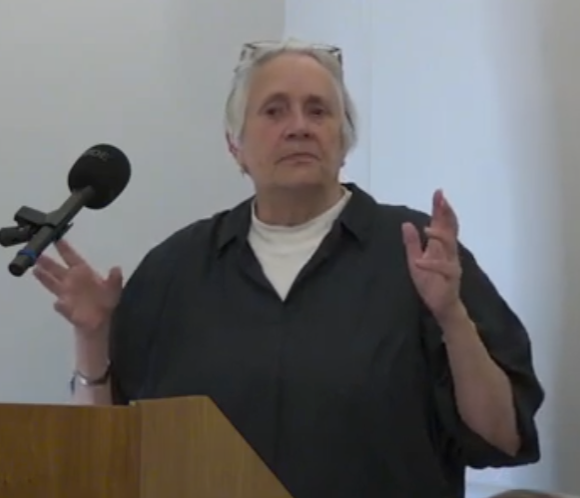
- Speaking at the Paul Mellon Centre in 2023
- Education: Bartlett School UCL; De Montfort University; University of Reading
- Occupations: Activist, educator, artist, writer

Jos Boys is an architecture-trained, activist, educator, artist and writer. She was a founder member of Matrix Feminist Design Co-operative and co-author of their 1984 book Making Space: Women and the Man-Made Environment (Pluto Press 1984/Verso 2022). Since 2008 she has been co-director of The DisOrdinary Architecture Project with disabled artist Zoe Partington, a disability-led platform that works with disabled artists to explore new ways to think about disability in architectural and design discourse and practice.

Her books Doing Disability Differently: an Alternative Handbook on Architecture, Dis/ability and Designing for Everyday Life (Routledge 2014) and Disability, Space, Architecture: A Reader (Routledge 2017) have become key texts in this field, with the latter called a

brilliant gathering of texts, both synthetic and surprising [that] should be taught in every architecture and design program, and may well become the new standard text for interdisciplinary disability studies courses generally.

— Susan Schweik, Professor of English and Disability Studies, UC Berkeley

Boys is also co-editor with Anthony Clarke and John Gardner of Neurodivergence and Architecture.

She has given numerous international keynote talks, including at The Bartlett UCL (2021), Arizona State (2021), Goldsmiths (2020), UTS Sydney (2020), the Design Museum London (2019), Melbourne University School of Design (2019), University of Innsbruck (2019), Yale University School of Architecture (2018), Victoria and Albert Museum (2018), Aarhus University Copenhagen (2017), Architectural Association London (2016), University of the Arts, London (2016) and the Taylor Institute, University of Calgary (2016).

Boys has been a visiting professor at Ulster and London Metropolitan Universities. She has been a Design Council Built Environment Expert (BEE) and a Fellow of the Royal Society of Arts; is Guest Professor at the Royal Danish Academy in Copenhagen and an honorary associate professor in the Knowledge Lab, Institute of Education, UCL. Jos Boys was one of the BBC's Women of the Year 2021.

== Career ==
Jos Boys is currently working as co-director of The DisOrdinary Architecture Project, enabled by funding from The Supporting Act Foundation for 2024–2025. Previously she worked at The Bartlett Faculty of Built Environment, University College London where she was Course Director of the MSc in Learning Environments. Before that, she worked for over 10 years as an independent Learning Environment consultant and researcher; and has written extensively about the complex and often contested inter-relationships between pedagogies, academic development, institutional policy and strategies, facilities planning and management, and building design. She has also worked as an educator in architecture and related disciplines across many institutions both in the UK and internationally, and as an academic developer and instructional designer. Underpinning this, as well as all her community-based design activism, is a particular interest in how to improve our understanding of everyday social, material and spatial practices, in support of the most disadvantaged in society. All her work explores how we can act across different perspectives and agendas to collaboratively discuss and improve built environments.

Jos Boys obtained her BSc at the Bartlett School UCL (then called the School of Environmental Studies) and has master's degrees in Advanced Architectural Studies (UCL 1981) and Photography (De Montfort University 2003). She obtained her PhD from the Faculty of Urban and Regional Studies, University of Reading with a thesis entitled Concrete Visions? Examining inter-relationships between housing design, material practices and everyday life in England 1830 – 1980 in 2001. Originally training as an architectural journalist for Building Design magazine, she also undertook projects at the Greater London Council (GLC) writing guidance on Women and Planning; and at Women's Design Service where she was a development worker, with co-founders Vron Ware, Sue Cavanagh and Wendy Davis. Throughout her life Jos Boys has been involved with many feminist and related networks, including Cutting Edge, a cross-disciplinary feminist research group exploring new design technologies, based at the University of Westminster (1995–2001), and the feminist spatial practices group Taking Place (2000– ). Together with curator Jon Astbury, she co-created an exhibition about Matrix at the Barbican entitled How We Live Now: reimagining spaces with Matrix feminist design collective (May – December 2021), as well as leading on the ongoing development of an open and accessible Matrix online archive.

The archive has been accessed and displayed in national and international exhibitions including Found Cities Lost Objects (a touring Arts Council England show, co-curated with Lubaina Himid,) in the Chronos: health, access and intimacy exhibition at Tensta Konsthalle Stockholm, Museum für Gestaltung Zürich, University of Melbourne, Oslo Architectural Biennale, ETHL Lausanne, ETH Zurich, MAXXI and Newcastle University UK.

== Selected projects ==
- Many More Parts than M! Reimagining disability, access and inclusion beyond compliance (2024) a prototype compendium of alternative concepts, stories, artistic work and architectural details that can creatively and critically inform design thinking and practice
- Seats at the Table public space interventions for London Festival of Architecture (2023) - a competition winning project in collaboration with circular economy collective ReFabricate for temporary installations, and an associated programme in a London park
- Festival Pavilions for Theaterformen Disabilty Arts Festival (2022 and 2023) - co-designed temporary urban interventions in Braunschweig (The Clearing 2022) and Hannover (Making Waves 2023), both based on concepts of DeafSpace, in collaboration with Deaf architect Richard Docherty, Deaf architectural consultant Christina Laing and DisOrdinary co-director Zoe Partington; together with Deaf and disabled German artists.
- Matrix Open Feminist Architecture Archive (MOFAA) (2020– ): an online learning resource that brings together archival resources from 1980s London, projected to explore the complex relationships between different kinds of bodies, spaces and architecture.
- Architecture Beyond Sight (ABS): the co-design, development and implementation of an architecture foundation study course for blind and visually impaired people ( a collaboration between The DisOrdinary Architecture Project and The Bartlett UCL) (2018 - )
- Disabled Artists Making Dis/Ordinary Spaces (DAMD/OS): a series of innovative and provocative collaborations between disabled artists and built environment educators across 10 architecture, interior and built environment courses across England.(2017–19).
- Making Discursive Spaces: a prototyping collaboration bringing disabled and Deaf artists together with interior design students in the School of Architecture and Design, University of Brighton (2008).
- A Sense of Place: developing audio-descriptions of buildings and objects for blind and visually impaired people as part of RIBA Architecture Week and the London Festival of Architecture (2007); in collaboration with University of Brighton and VocalEyes.

== Bibliography ==
Jos Boys' research, writing and teaching is concerned with understanding the social construction of "normal" architectural and design education and practices; and about co-developing alternative forms of producing built spaces that instead start from difference, from the perceptions and experiences of marginalised groups, whether in education or other spaces. There remains a lack of theoretical understanding as to how built space works, or its complex relationships to diverse occupation, whether for living, working or learning. Boys' co-edited collections all aim to open up multiple perspectives and voices, so as to share approaches and attitudes; to critically reflect on different assumptions; and to work together to build better models for architecture as a discipline that based on social, spatial and material justice.

=== Disability and architecture ===
- "Care as active architectural practice" Schaad, Gabrielle, and Torsten Lange, eds.gta papers 7, Institute for the History and Theory of Architecture (ETH Zurich 2023)
- Clarke, Anthony & boys, Jos & Gardner, John. Neurodivergence and Architecture. (Elsevier, 2022).
- Designing for Difference Molonglo Online Series (2021)
- The DisOrdinary Architecture Project: A Handy Guide for Doing Disability Differently in Architecture and Urban Design in The Funambulist 19 The Space of Ableism (September–October 2018)
- Disability, Space, Architecture: A Reader (ed) (Routledge 2017)
- "Cripping Spaces? On Dis/abling Phenomenology in Architecture" in Bryan E. Norwood (Ed) Special Issue: Phenomenology against architectural phenomenology LOG 42 (2017)
- "Invisibility Work? How starting from dis/ability challenges normative social, spatial and material practices." In Frichot, H., Gabreilsson, c., and Runting, H. (eds). Architecture and Feminisms (Routledge/AHRA 2017)
- "Space, place and 'careful' designing for everyday life" in Bates, C., Imrie, R., and Kulman, K. (Eds) Design as caring in an urban world (Wiley-Blackwell 2016)
- "The dis/ordinary spaces of disability and gender" in Soldatic, K., and Johnson, K. (Eds) Disability and Rurality: Identity, Gender and Belonging (Routledge 2016)
- Doing Disability Differently: an alternative handbook on architecture, dis/ability, and designing for everyday life (Routledge 2014)

=== Learning environments ===
- Adapting School Designs for learning and well-being during and post pandemic. With Anna Mavrogianni and Anna Jeffery (UCL 2022)
- Educating the City: Schools as Social Infrastructure with Anna Jeffery/Architecture Initiative (UCL 2020)"Finding the spaces in-between; learning as a social and material practice" in Carvalho, L., Goodyear P., and De Laat, M. (eds) Place-Based Spaces for Networked Learning (Routledge, 2015)
- Building Better Universities: Strategies, Spaces, Technologies (Routledge 2014)
- Developing Research Methods for Analyzing Learning Spaces That Can Inform Institutional Missions of Learning and Engagement.Perry Chapman Prize for Research into Learning Spaces (Society of College and University Planners 2013). Written with Clare Melhuish and Angelina Wilson.
- Museums and Higher Education working together: Challenges and Opportunities (Ashgate 2013) Co-edited with Anne Boddington and Catherine Speight.
- Reshaping Learning: a critical reader. The future of learning spaces in post-compulsory education (Sense Publishers 2011). Co-edited with Anne Boddington.
- Towards Creative Learning Spaces: Re-thinking the Architecture of Post-Compulsory Education (Routledge 2010)
- "Creative Differences: deconstructing the conceptual learning spaces of Higher Education and Museums" in Cook et al. (eds) Museums and Design Education: Looking to Learn, Learning to See, (Ashgate, 2009)
- The e-Revolution and Post-Compulsory Education; Using e-business models to deliver quality education (Routledge 2008) Co-edited with Peter Ford (2008)

=== Feminism and architecture ===
- "Revealing Work. Interrogating artifacts to (re) view histories of feminist architectural practice." In Architecture and Culture JournalSpecial Issue: Architecture and Feminisms (Taylor and Francis 2017) Written with Julia Dwyer.
- "Windows on the World? (or why we might be using the wrong frames): Architecture, identity and the new technologies" in Cutting Edge (eds.)Digital Desires (I.B.Tauris Press, 2000)
- "Positions in the landscape? Gender, material and virtual space" in Cutting Edge (eds.) Desire by Design? Body, territory and the new technologies ( I.B Tauris Press, 1999)
- "Beyond Metaphors and Maps; re-thinking architecture and gender" in Rosa Ainley (ed.) New Frontiers Space, Bodies and Gender (Routledge, 1998)
- "(Mis)Representing Society; problems in making social meanings through architecture" in Mo Dodson and Jerry Palmer (eds.) Design and Aesthetics (Routledge 1996)
- "Neutral Gazes and Knowable Objects" in Duncan McCorquodale et al. (eds.) Desiring Practices (Black Dog Press 1996)
- "Women and the Designed Environment; dealing with difference" in Sophie Bowbly (ed.) Built Environment Vol16, No 4 1990 pp249 –256 (1990)
- "From Alcatraz to the OK Corral; Postwar British Housing Design" In Attfield and Kirkham (Eds) A View from the Interior: Feminism, women and design (Women's Press 1989)
- "Is there a feminist analysis of architecture?" in Sophie Bowbly (ed.) Built Environment Vol. 10 no1 Nov. pp25–34 (1986)
- Making Space: Women and the Man-made Environment (Pluto Press 1984). Co-authored with Matrix Feminist Architecture Collective.

== Professional memberships ==
- Matrix Feminist Design Co-operative
- 2022 – Member, Equality, Diversity & Inclusion Advocate Network University of Westminster School of Architecture and Cities
- 2021–2022 – Delphi Expert and Network member A4LE scoping study The Future of Learning Design, led by Association for Learning Environments Europe and University of Melbourne
- 2017–2020 – Visiting Professorship in Diversity and Creativity, Foundation Programme, CASS, London Metropolitan University
- 2016–2019 – Visiting Professorship, Learning Landscapes, University of Ulster, Belfast, Northern Ireland
- 2016–2018 – Member, Taylor Institute, International Advisory Board on Learning Spaces, University of Calgary, Canada.
