= John P. Macarthur =

Australian architectural historian

John Peter Macarthur FAHA (born 1958) is an Australian architectural historian, critic and academic, based in Brisbane Australia.

== Education ==
Macarthur graduated from the University of Queensland with Bachelor (Hons 1) and Master of Design Studies degrees (1984). He then undertook a doctorate at the University of Cambridge (1989) where he studied with Joseph Rykwert and later with Mark Cousins.

== Career ==
Macarthur is a Professor of Architecture in the School of Architecture Design and Planning (formerly the School of Architecture), at the University of Queensland, where he has worked since 1990. He teaches architectural history, research and design courses, and advises postgraduate students. He founded the Architecture, Theory, Criticism and History (ATCH) Research Centre at UQ, and served as President of the Society of Architectural Historians, Australia and New Zealand (SAHANZ) between 2001 and 2003. In 2013 he was made a SAHANZ Life Fellow.

In 2016 Macarthur was elected as a Fellow of the Australian Academy of Humanities and a Fellow of the Queensland Academy of Arts and Sciences. He has served as Dean and Head of the School of Architecture at UQ and was a member of the College of Experts, for the Australian Research Council (ARC). In 2021 he was awarded the Neville Quarry Architectural Education Prize, from the Australian Institute of Architects. The prize recognises outstanding contributions to architectural education and was shared with Conrad Hamann.

=== Research ===
Macarthur's research is primarily in the field of the intellectual history architecture. Much of this has focused on how architecture, aesthetics and the arts relate to one another. He is best known for his work on the picturesque. To date Macarthur has authored and edited more than ten books (including collaborative works) and published more than 150 papers. His most recent book Is Architecture Art? an introduction to the aesthetics of architecture will be published by Bloomsbury in late 2024.

== Bibliography ==
- Macarthur, John (2007). The Picturesque: Architecture, Disgust and other Irregularities. 1st ed. London, New York: Routledge.
- Leach, Andrew and John P. Macarthur eds. (2009). Architecture disciplinarity and the arts. 1 ed. Ghent, Belgium: A & S Press.
- Macarthur, John; Deborah van der Plaat, Janina Gosseye and Andrew Wilson eds. (2015). Hot modernism: Queensland architecture 1945-1975. London, United Kingdom: Artifice.
- Leach, Andrew; John Macarthur and Maarten Delbeke, eds. (2015). The baroque in architectural culture, 1880–1980. Farnham, United Kingdom: Ashgate Publishing.
- Macarthur, John, Holden, Susan, Paine, Ashley and Davidts, Wouter (2018). Pavilion propositions: nine points on an architectural phenomenon. Amsterdam, Netherlands: Valiz.
- Micheli, Silvia and John Macarthur, eds. (2018). Italy/Australia: postmodern architecture in translation. Melbourne, Australia: Uro.
- Paine, Ashley; Susan Holden and John Macarthur, eds. (2020). Valuing Architecture: heritage and the economics of culture. Amsterdam, Netherlands: Valiz.
- van der Plaat, Deborah & John Macarthur, eds (2021). Karl Langer Modern Architect and Migrant in the Australian Tropics. London: Bloomsbury, 2021. ISBN 9781350068117.
- Macarthur, John, Is Architecture Art? an introduction to the aesthetics of architecture, London: Bloomsbury 2024.

== Selected essays ==
- Macarthur, John (2000). "The Look of the Object". Assemblage - A Critical Journal of Architecture and Design Culture, 41 (April), 48-48.
- Macarthur, John (2009). Townscape, anti-scrape and surrealism: Paul Nash and John Piper in The Architectural Review. The Journal of Architecture, 14 (3), 387–406. doi: 10.1080/13602360903027988
- Macarthur, John (2010). Schwitters and Benjamin: The modernity of the baroque and romanticism. The Journal of Architecture, 15 (3), 283–300. doi: 10.1080/13602365.2010.486567
- Macarthur, John (2016). Writing on the image: architecture, the city and the politics of representation. Architectural Theory Review, 20 (3), 376–379. doi: 10.1080/13264826.2016.1185133
- Macarthur, John (2018). The banality of 240 cm. House tour: views of the unfurnished interior. (pp. 112–115) edited by Adam Jasper. Zürich, Switzerland: Park Books and Pro Helvetia.
- Macarthur, John (2019). 'In the service of clouds': the picturesque and aquatint. Architecture through drawing. (pp. 168–177) edited by Desley Luscombe, Helen Thomas and Niall Hobhouse. London, United Kingdom: Lund Humphries.
- Macarthur, John (2021). "Robin Boyd’s Australian Ugliness, ugliness and liberal education". After The Australian Ugliness. (pp. 45–52) edited by Naomi Stead, Tom Lee, Megan Patty and Ewan McEoin. Melbourne, VIC Australia: National Gallery of Victoria/Thames & Hudson.

== See also ==
- Picturesque
- Society of Architectural Historians, Australia and New Zealand
