= Justine Clark =

Australian architect

Justine Clark AM
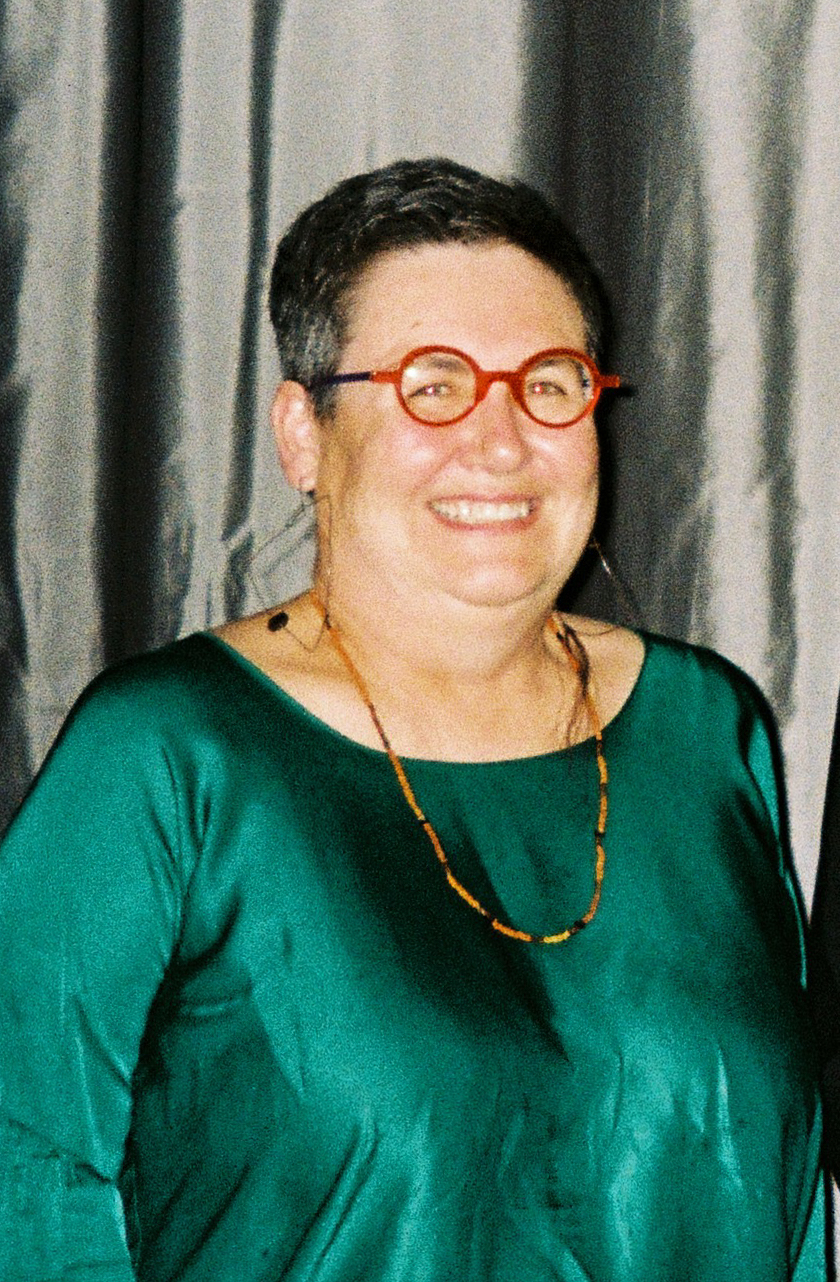
- Clark in 2023
- Born: New Zealand
- Education: University of Auckland, Victoria University of Wellington
- Occupations: Architectural editor, writer and researcher

Justine Clark is an architectural editor, writer, speaker and researcher, based in Melbourne, Australia. She is the editor of Parlour, a former editor of Architecture Australia, and co-author of Looking for the Local: Architecture and the New Zealand Modern.

== Education ==
Born in New Zealand, Clark completed her bachelor's degree with honours in architecture at the University of Auckland and her master's degree by research with distinction in architecture at Victoria University of Wellington. As of 2023, she resides in Melbourne, Australia.

== Career ==
After completing her education, Clark was the 1998 National Library Research Fellow at the Alexander Turnbull Library, which resulted in the publication of the book Looking for the Local: Architecture and the New Zealand Modern, co-authored with Paul Walker, and accompanying exhibition.

In 2000, Clark began working for Architecture Australia, the magazine of the Australian Institute of Architects, and was the editor of the magazine from 2003 to 2011. She was a collaborator on the Australia Research Council (ARC) linkage grant funded project "Equity and Diversity in the Australian Architecture Profession: Women, Work, and Leadership", led by Dr Naomi Stead. Her involvement in this project lead to her position as founding editor of the online publication Parlour: Women, Equity, Architecture, which began as a repository for the ARC research and is now an ongoing platform for the dissemination of research on gender, equity and architecture.

She has reviewed architecture for The Age newspaper and curates exhibitions. In addition to her work for Parlour she is a member the Office of the Victorian Government Architect's Design Review Panel and the South Australian Office for Design and Architecture's Design Review Panel. Justine is an honorary research fellow at the Faculty of Architecture, Building and Planning at the University of Melbourne.

Clark was awarded the 2019 President's Prize by the Victorian chapter of the Australian Institute of Architects, in recognition of outstanding contribution towards the profession.

Clark is an advocate for systemic change in organisations to support more diverse workplaces. She says:

Wouldn’t it be great if the procuring of buildings required the demonstration of a commitment to equity? (Justine Clark 2021)

== Selected publications ==
- Clark, Justine; Walker, Paul (2000). Looking for the Local: Architecture and the New Zealand Modern. Wellington: Victoria University Press.
- Clark, Justine (January 2011). "Introduction to Architecture Australia Volume 100". Architecture Australia. 100 (1).
- Clark, Justine (2 November 2012). "Morph and South, a Mixed Bag". The Age.
- Clark, Justine; Walker, Paul (2012). "Interpretation, Intention and the Work of Architecture". In Naomi Stead (ed.). Semi-Detached: Writing, Representation and Criticism in Architecture. URO Media.
- Clark, Justine; Walker, Paul (2013). "Negotiating the Intention of the Work". In Arjen Oosterman (ed.). Ways to be Critical. Vol. 36. Stichting Archis. ISBN 978-90-77966-365.
- Clark, Justine (September 2014). "Where do all the Women Go?". Architecture Australia.
- Clark, Justine; Walker, Paul. "Book, House, Home". In Barbara Brooks (ed.). At Home in New Zealand. Bridget Williams Books.

== Selected exhibitions ==
1996 Cuttings from the Centre, City Gallery, Wellington. Co-curator and co-designer with Sharon Jansen.

2000 Looking for the Local, an exhibition at the Adam Art Gallery, Victoria University of Wellington. Co-designer and co-curator with Paul Walker.

2015 Portraits of Practice, Tin Sheds Gallery, University of Sydney. Co-curator and co-designer with Naomi Stead, Maryam Gusheh, Gill Matthewson and Fiona Young.

== Awards ==
- Victorian Institute of Architects, Bates Smart Award for Architecture in the Media (2009) - for Architecture Australia's special issue on Indigenous Housing.
- Victorian Institute of Architects, Bates Smart Award for Architecture in the Media (2011) - for her contribution to architectural discourse through the architectural publication Architecture Australia
- Victorian Institute of Architects, Bates Smart Award for Architecture in the Media (2013) - for her contribution to Parlour
- Munro Diversity Award (2014), with Gill Matthewson, for establishing Parlour, and the promotion of diversity and equality in architecture.
- Victorian Institute of Architects, Bates Smart Award for Architecture in the Media (2015) - for her contribution to the Parlour Guides to Equitable Practice
- Marion Mahony Griffin Prize (2015).
- Victorian Institute of Architects 2019 President's Prize.
- Member of the Order of Australia, 2026 Australia Day Honours - for "significant service to architecture in a range of appointments"
