= Philip Goad =

Australian academic

Philip J. Goad FAHA is an Australian academic, currently serving as Professor of Architecture in the Faculty of Architecture, Building and Planning at the University of Melbourne. He is also a former President of the Victorian Chapter of the Royal Australian Institute of Architects. Phillip became Chair of the Heritage Council of Victoria in July 2021.

== Career ==
Goad researches in the areas of architectural history, theory and design. He is an authority on modern Australian architecture. One of his fields of expertise is the life and work of Robin Boyd. He has been a visiting scholar at Columbia University, the Bartlett School of Architecture (London) and UCLA (Los Angeles).

Goad is a past editor of Fabrications, the Journal of the Society of Architectural Historians, Australia and New Zealand, and is a former contributing editor to Architecture Australia. He has also worked extensively as an architectural conservation consultant and exhibition curator. With Julie Willis, Goad edited the Encyclopedia of Australian Architecture in 2012.

As an architect, his most notable work has been for the Melbourne firm, Edmond and Corrigan, as project architect for the RMIT Building 8 project in Swanston Street, central Melbourne.

In 2024, Goad served on the jury for the $60 million revitalization of the National Gallery of Australia's three-hectare sculpture garden, alongside Nick Mitzevich, Nici Cumpston, and Teresa Moller.

== Awards ==
In 2000, Goad was awarded the Bates Smart Award for Architecture in the Media, from the Royal Australian Institute of Architects. In 1994 he received the Joint RAPI Award for Excellence from the Royal Australian Planning Institute and in 1991 he was a recipient of the RAIA President's Award. He was elected a Fellow of the Australian Academy of the Humanities in 2008.

== Selected publications ==
- Goad PJ & Pieris AD. 2005. New Directions in Tropical Asian Architecture. Sydney, Australia: Pesaro Publishing.
- Goad, P., 2000, Architecture Bali: Architectures of Welcome, Sydney: Pesaro Publishing
- Goad PJ, Wilken RC & Willis JL. 2004. Australian Modern: the Architecture of Stephenson and Turner. Carlton, Australia: Miegunyah Press (Melbourne UP).
- Goad PJ. 2001. New Directions in Australian Architecture. Sydney, Australia: Pesaro Publishing.
- Goad PJ. 2003. Judging Architecture: issues, divisions, triumphs, Victorian architecture awards 1929-2003. Melbourne, Australia: Royal Australian Institute of Architects, RAIA Victoria.
- Goad, Philip & Gruzman, Neville, 2006. Gruzman: An Architect and His City. Sydney: Craftsman House.
- Goad, Phillip & Willis, Julie, 2011. The Encyclopedia of Australian Architecture. Cambridge University Press. ISBN 978-0-521-88857-8.
