= Matrix Feminist Design Co-operative =

Matrix Feminist Design Co-Operative was formed in London in 1981.

It was one of the first architectural organisations worldwide to bring a feminist approach to architecture and the design of the built environment and to challenge patriarchal spatial systems. Matrix pursued these objectives through built projects, theoretical analysis, commissioned research and publications, including the book Making Space: Women and the Man-made Environment published in 1984. The book explores relationships between gender and architecture, building on the then emerging work from feminist geographers and historians in the UK and US, including Doreen Massey, Linda McDowell, Susana Torre and Dolores Hayden.

== Early years ==
Matrix originated as a feminist offshoot of the New Architecture Movement (NAM) in London. In the late 70s a group of women involved in NAM began meeting separately to discuss feminist perspectives and specific issues facing women in the built environment. This led to the formation of the Feminist Design Collective (1978–80) which then split into Matrix and Mitra. The latter focusing on enabling more women into the architectural profession; whilst Matrix focused on changing existing practices.

Related groups include the Women in Manual Trades (WAMT) a pioneering charity supporting women in construction, and the Women's Design Service, founded in 1985.

Matrix had many contributing members involved across a range of projects and affiliated groups between 1978 and 1994. These included the Women and Space conference (1979), the Home Truths exhibition (1980), the Matrix book group (1980–84), the Matrix support group (1980–84), and the architectural practice (1980–1994). Key initial members include Frances Bradshaw, Susan Francis, Barbara McFarlane, Anne Thorne, Julia Dwyer, and Jos Boys. Benedicte Foo was likely to also be an early member. Some of the founding members lived in squats or short-life housing while the collective was starting up, which meant living costs were minimal and energy could be directed to the work of the collective.

== Architectural practice ==
The Matrix Feminist Design Cooperative design cooperative was a women-led and multi-racial architectural practice. Set up as a workers’ cooperative, it was run using a non-hierarchical management approach, with everyone paid at the same rate.

The practice specialised in co-design, collaborative ways of working with people, groups and organisations that were traditionally excluded from architectural design processes. The type of projects undertaken by the practice also extended beyond the range of standard architectural services, to include design guidance and training support. Along with other architectural organisations at the time across the UK, Matrix provided 'technical aid' to community and women's groups. The aim of Community Technical Aid Centres (CTAC) was to provide free or funded support services in a locality such as in construction, how to obtain funding, create neighbourhood organisations and building projects, and how to campaign for change.

Methods for working with clients stemmed from Matrix's founding commitments to involving women in the design and production of buildings. Women from the practice used models and building visits to empower their clients to share in making design decisions.

The Cooperative also provided courses on technical drawing for trainee tradeswomen, on the building process for workers and client groups, and on building law, casting general structures and construction for practising tradeswomen.

A course on technical drawing that started as a consultative tool for Dalston Children's Centre (now the Bathhouse Children’s Community Centre) was developed further for use on women builders' training schemes, particularly at Women's Education in Building (WEB), a group delivering projects on behalf of Learning and Skills Councils in West and Central London. Some of this work helped the development of a Women into Architecture and Building (WIAB) access course at the Polytechnic of North London (later University of North London, then London Metropolitan University) founded by Yvonne Dean with many women from Matrix involved as tutors, and with Matrix co-founder Susan Francis as course leader for a number of years.

== Built work ==
Built projects include:

- 1993: Pier Training Workshop, Woolwich
- 1992: Essex Women’s Refuge
- 1991: Al-Hasaniya, The Moroccan Women’s Centre, Trellick Tower, West London
- 1990s: Little Crackle Nursey for Holy Trinity Church Institute, Hackney
- 1988–90: Half Moon Young People’s Theatre, Tower Hamlets: conversion of Poplar Town Hall
- 1988–91: Grosvenor Terrace Housing, Southwark new build housing comprising 18 independent living flats for single people
- 1987–88: Pluto Lesbian and Gay Housing Co-operative, Islington: housing conversions
- 1986–88: Jumoke Training Nursery, Southwark London
- 1984–87: Jagonari Educational Resource Centre, Tower Hamlets: new build for Asian women’s organisation including crèche and large kitchen.
- 1984–85: Hackney Women’s Centre: shop conversion
- 1984–85: Dalston Children’s Centre, Hackney: conversion of disused baths

Matrix is probably best known for the Jagonari Educational Resource Centre, a project for women from the largely Bangladeshi community of Whitechapel, London. An unsuccessful application was made to list the Centre in 2018.

Matrix were a member of the Association of Community Technical Aid Centres (ACTAC) and gained funding from the Greater London Council to provide technical advice. The GLC enabled over 40 voluntary organisations which benefitted women to develop their premises. Client organisations for feasibility studies and/or for projects that did not go ahead included Brixton Black Women’s Centre, The Calthorpe Project, Bermondsey Women’s Centre, Hackney Asian Women’s Centre, Maxilla and Defoe Nurseries, Lambeth African Women’s Centre, Haringey Women’s Training/Education Centre and Charterhouse Women’s Project,

== Publications ==
Matrix produced a range of publications, including the book Making Space: Women and the Man Made Environment (London: Pluto Press, 1984) and two pamphlets funded by the GLC Women's Committee A Job Designing Buildings: For Women Interested in Architecture and Buildings (London: Matrix Feminist Design Co-operative, 1986) and Building for Childcare: Making Better Buildings for the Under-5s (London: Matrix Feminist Design Co-operative, 1986).

In 1993, they collaborated with Penoyre & Prasad architects, Elsie Owusu Architects and Audley English Associates to produce Accommodating Diversity, a booklet on housing design for minority ethnic, cultural and religious groups.

Particularly in the later years Matrix members published and gave presentations on race and gender discrimination in the profession; including Women Architects, a UK research booklet funded by the UK Arts Council (1996); Building = Equality, a Working Paper promoting equality of opportunity for black professionals within construction industry (1996); Black Women in Architecture from a UK Perspective (Paper presented to International Conference on Gender and Urbanisation, sponsored but United Nations in Kenya (1994); and Where Are They? Black Women: Architecture and the Built Environment, published in ISSUE (1993).

== Impact ==
Matrix were part of a much bigger second wave international feminist movement in the 1980s and 90s that campaigned to increase the number of women going into the architectural profession, to challenge conventional design practices and to enable women influence the design of built space. They were contributors to the seminal Paradise Circus: Women and the City film shown on Channel 4 in 1988, directed by Heather Powell for the Birmingham Film and Video Workshop, as well as to Ordinary People: Why Women Become Feminists in 1990 (also on Channel 4, with an associated publication). Matrix led and took part in many events of the period, including Women and Space at the Architectural Association in 1979, ‘Women’s Realm’ (Feminist Architects’ Network, North London Polytechnic 1987) and Alterities, a major international conference in Paris on feminism and architecture in 1999.

Exhibitions of their work include:

- Diaspora: Black Architects and International Architecture 1970 – 1990 Exhibition, Chicago 1993
- Desiring Practices: Architecture, Gender and the Interdisciplinary RIBA exhibition 1995 (curated by Sarah Wigglesworth)
- Drawing on Diversity: women, architecture and practice at RIBA Heinz Gallery, 1997
- AA XX 100 Women in Architecture 1917–2017, in 2017, with an associated publication edited by Lynne Walker and Elizabeth Darling
- Still I Rise: feminisms, gender, resistance at Nottingham Contemporary,
- Arnolfini Gallery Bristol, 2019
- De La Warr Pavilion, Bexhill, 2019
- Making Space: Housing Feminism and Urban Change at Guest Projects London, 2019
- How We Live Now, an exhibition at the Barbican Centre, London, 2021.

== Legacy ==
Matrix has had ongoing impact on feminist approaches to design and participatory design methodologies, and is an important precursor to later feminist groups and organisations. Recognition is increasing, the editors of Women and the Making of Built Space in England, 1870–1950 describe Making Space as “highly important but underrated.”

Some ex-Matrix members have developed feminist spatial practices such as through Taking Place formed by Jos Boys, Julia Dwyer, (who were Matrix members) together with Sue Ridge, Jane Rendell, Doina Petrescu, Katie Lloyd Thomas, Brigid McLeer, Helen Stratford, Miche Fabre Lewin, Angie Pascoe and Teresa Hoskyns. Spatial practice was also developed by Julia Dwyer and Sue Ridge partnership.

The impact of the collective was reinforced in 2019 and 2020 when Matrix was nominated for the RIBA Gold Medal Award by Harriet Harriss following a campaign by the group Part W. In 2020, the Matrix Open Feminist Architecture Archive (MOfaa) project received seed funding from the University College London Bartlett Innovation Fund to develop an online resource.
