= RMIT Gallery =

Art gallery in Melbourne, Australia

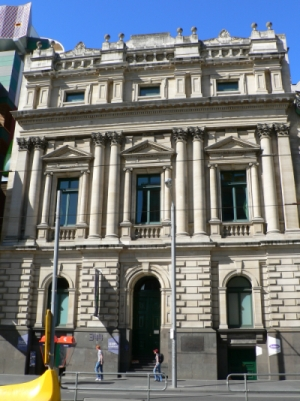
- Historic section of Storey Hall at RMIT's City campus, home to RMIT Gallery
- Established: 1977
- Location: Melbourne, Victoria, Australia
- Type: public, university
- Director: Helen Rayment
- Owner: RMIT
- Website: rmitgallery.com

RMIT Gallery is an Australian public art gallery located in Melbourne, Victoria. It is the main art gallery of the Royal Melbourne Institute of Technology (RMIT).

RMIT Gallery opened on 16 March 1977. It is housed in the historic section of Storey Hall, built in 1887, on RMIT's Melbourne City campus.

The gallery is considered to be one of Melbourne's most vibrant art spaces and has a constantly changing exhibition program of architecture, craft, contemporary art, design, fashion, and fine art. It also presents regular talks, lectures, discussion, and public events and publishes widely on art and design research in partnership with RMIT Publishing.

The gallery is also charged as the caretaker of RMIT's permanent University Art Collection. The collection includes the substantial Linsday Edward Collection of fine art and the invaluable W.E. Macmillan Collection of gold and silver—as well as a number of other sub-collections. The Linsday Edward Collection has a strong focus on Australian art. It holds works by leading Australian artists (many of whom are alumni or former faculty of RMIT) such as: Howard Arkley, John Brack, Leonard French, Roger Kemp, Inge King, Max Meldrum, John Olsen, Lenton Parr, Fred Williams, and others.

A history of the art collection is documented in the publication A Skilled Hand and Cultivated Mind: A Guide to the Architecture and Art of RMIT.
