= Intellect Books =

Academic publisher

- Founded: 1984
- Founder: Masoud Yazdani
- Country of origin: United Kingdom
- Headquarters location: Bristol
- Distribution: Ingram Publishing Services UK; University of Chicago Press (US)
- Publication types: Books and academic journals
- Official website: intellectbooks.com

Intellect Books is an independent academic book publisher based in Bristol, UK. The press was founded in 1984 by Masoud Yazdani, a former professor of digital media at the University of the West of England. The press specializes in books about film, media, and popular culture; it also publishes over 100 academic journals.

The press is a member of the Association of Learned and Professional Society Publishers (ALPSP) and the Independent Publishers Guild (IPG). The publisher is also a Research4Life partner.

== Journals ==
The following are some of the journals published by the Intellect Books.

=== Studies in South Asian Film & Media ===
South Asian Film & Media
- Discipline: Film studies, Television studies
- Language: English
- Edited by: Namrata Sathe

Publication details
- Publisher: Intellect Books
- Frequency: 2/year
- ISO 4: Find out here

Indexing
- ISSN: 1756-4921 (print); 1756-493X (web)

Links
- Journal homepage; Online Access

The Studies in South Asian Film & Media is biannual double-blind peer-reviewed academic journal published by Intellect Books. It features articles on South Asian media culture, film history, aesthetic, crossovers between cinema and regional or vernacular cinema. The journal is currently edited by Namrata Sathe.

== See also ==
- Academic publishing
- List of English-language book publishing companies
