= Architecture Australia =

Australian magazine

- Architecture Australia cover c. 1970
- Editorial director: Katelin Butler
- Categories: Architecture
- Frequency: Bi-monthly
- Publisher: Architecture Media
- Founded: 1904
- Country: Australia
- Website: architecturemedia.com/magazines/architecture-australia/
- ISSN: 0003-8725
- OCLC: 44653494

Architecture Australia is a national magazine covering the practice and works of architects and architecture in Australia. It is published bi-monthly by Architecture Media, and is the journal of the Australian Institute of Architects.

== History and profile ==
=== Establishment ===
Architecture Australia was established in 1904 under the title: The Journal of the Institute of Architects of New South Wales. It became The Salon in 1912, at which time it became the journal for the Institutes of New South Wales, Queensland, Western Australia, Tasmania and South Australia. It was renamed Architecture in 1917, then Architecture in Australia in 1955; eventually obtaining its current name in 1976.

The magazine began in January 1904 with volume 1 number 1 of The Journal of the Institute of Architects of New South Wales, published by William Brooks & Co. of 17 Castlereagh Street, Sydney. In 1924 it was taken over by the publisher Art in Australia, owned by Sydney Ure Smith. In 1938 Architecture became the official journal of the Royal Australian Institute of Architects.

The magazine reflected contemporary styles and attitudes, for example in 1907 a review by Robert Haddon of "The First Australian Exhibition of Woman's Work, Melbourne" depicted women in the kitchen (Art and Architecture, November/December 1907).

In 1980 the magazine moved to Strand Publishing, and then to Architecture Media, who remain publishers of the journal.

=== Editors ===
Editors of the magazine include: John Barlow, George Sydney Jones, D. H. Souter, Nicholas Shields, C. A. Jeffries, Allen W. Gerard, Eric Lindsay Thompson, Professor Alfred S. Hook, Stella Tottenham (1950–1954), J. S. Prain, Lyall Howe, Travis McKie, Peter Keys, Colin Brewer, John Oostermeyer, Anne Leonhard, Vincent Smith (1975–1977), Don Gazzard, Brian Zouch (1977), Shirley Young, David Watson, Tom Heath, Ian McDougall (1990–1992), Davina Jackson (1993–2000), Ian Close (2000–2004), Justine Clark (assistant editor, 2000–2004, editor 2004–2011), Timothy Moore, and Cameron Bruhn (2009–18). The current editorial director is Katelin Butler (2018–present).

=== Photographers ===
Architecture Australia has included work by many of Australia's leading architectural photographers, including Patrick Bingham-Hall, Harold Cazneaux, Max Dupain, John Gollings, Fritz Kos, David Moore, Wolfgang Sievers, Peter Bennetts, Dianna Snape and Brett Boardman.

=== Feature editions ===
Special features have been devoted to the works of prominent women architects. The magazine promotes itself as providing "...provocative, informative and engaging discussion of the best built-works and the issues that matter".
