= SAHANZ =

SAHANZ ("Society of Architectural Historians, Australia and New Zealand") was founded in South Australia in 1984. It is a scholarly society for the advancement of research into the history of architecture, with a focus on New Zealand, Australia and the South Pacific. It holds an annual conference and produces a journal, Fabrications. The current President, Flavia Marcello from Swinburne University of Technology, was elected to the role in 2023.

== Aims ==
To provide standards of excellence in architectural history through the following means:

- creating communication and meeting between people active in architectural history in Australia and New Zealand;
- encouraging discussion, criticism and debate among all who are interested in the subject of architectural history;
- holding regular conventions at regional and national venues for the above purposes;
- issuing a scholarly journal;
- encouraging student participation in its activities;
- supporting the teaching of architectural history;
- supporting the processes of conservation in relation to such matters as significant structures and sites, documents and archives.

== History ==
SAHANZ was established in 1984 by Professor David Saunders, at the University of Adelaide, South Australia. Professor Suanders Served as the first President (1985-86). Throughout its history the society has promoted collegiality amongst its members, however, as Julia Gatley has written, this history has not been without its tensions, particularly between the empiricist historians and those with a commitment to theory. (Gatley, J. 'SAHANZ: the first 50 years', in Fabrications 13, 2, May 2004, pp. 63–77.) The society is a partner organisation of the Society of Architectural Historians (USA). The society has had 21 individuals serve as Presidents. Among these, were Judith Brine (1986-87), Fiona Gardner (1993-95), Philip Goad (1997-99), John Macarthur (2001-03), Hannah Lewi (2005-07), Peter Kohane (2007-09), Robin Skinner (2009-11) Stuart King (2011-13), Christoph Schnoor (2013-15), Antony Moulis (2015-17), Naomi Stead (2017-19), Paul Hogben (2019-21, 2021-23) and Flavia Marcello (2024-25). The current President is Julia Gatley.

To mark the twentieth anniversary, New Zealand scholar Julia Gatley was commissioned to write a history of the society. In 2008, a selection of essays presented at the conference over its history were published in Shifting Views: Selected Essays on the Architectural History of Australia and New Zealand edited by Andrew Leach, Antony Moulis, and Nicole Sully, and published by the University of Queensland Press. The collection included essays Judith Brine, Joan Kerr, Miles Lewis, Sarah Treadwell, Philip Goad, Julie Willis, and Mike Austin, and featured a preface written by Hannah Lewi. In 2021 Macarena de la Vega de Leon wrote a follow-up to Gatley's essay, discussing the following fifteen years in the Society's history.

== Publications ==
SAHANZ produces two main publications: the Fabrications journal, and proceedings of the annual Society conference.

A listing of the conferences back to 1984 is available on the society’s website.

Fabrications is the refereed journal of the Society of Architectural Historians, Australia and New Zealand and is available through Taylor & Francis. Established in 1989, it is devoted to scholarly publication in the field of architectural history. While one need not be a member of SAHANZ to publish in Fabrications, the Journal's contents reflect the wide interests of the Society's diverse membership. It particularly welcomes papers on the architectural, urban and landscape history of Australia, New Zealand, the South Pacific and South-East Asian regions, while casting its net much further afield. The journal thus publishes refereed, academic essays and book reviews (by invitation or application) that are both purely concerned with the region, and which take a wider view of international questions, or issues beyond the Society's obvious frame of reference.

Three issues are published each year: one is usually themed. The Books Received and Book Reviews sections account for new publications in architectural history concerned with Australia, New Zealand, the South Pacific and South-East Asian regions. Fabrications is indexed in the Avery Index of Architecture Periodicals. [ISSN 1033-1867]. Listings of the contents of all back issues of Fabrications are available on the society’s website. The current editors of the journal are Isabel Rousset and Susan Holden.

== Membership ==
SAHANZ invites professional, academic and student members who have an interest in the field of architectural history and theory in Australasia, Asia and the Pacific. Membership is renewed annually at the end of June. Members receive copies of Fabrications, and discounted attendance at the annual conference of the Society. There is currently a membership of around 170, consisting primarily of academics from universities in Australia and New Zealand.

== Grants ==
SAHANZ offers an annual grant in memory of the founder of the Society, David Saunders. The David Saunders Founders Grant is intended to support research by beginning researchers who are members of SAHANZ.

== See also ==
- Architectural history
- Architecture of Australia
- Architecture of New Zealand
- National Trust of Australia
- New Zealand Historic Places Trust
- Society of Architectural Historians of Great Britain
- Society of Architectural Historians
