= National Register of Historic Places listings in northern Worcester County, Massachusetts =

Location of Worcester County in Massachusetts

This is a list of the National Register of Historic Places (NRHP) designated in northern Worcester County, Massachusetts. It includes listings from all Worcester County communities through which Massachusetts Route 2 passes, and those that lie to their north. This includes the communities of Ashburnham, Ashby, Athol, Fitchburg, Gardner, Harvard, Lancaster, Leominster, Lunenburg, Phillipston, Royalston, Templeton, Westminster, and Winchendon. National Register listings for other communities in the county are listed elsewhere.

Contents: Counties in Massachusetts

Barnstable | Berkshire | Bristol | Dukes | Essex | Franklin | Hampden | Hampshire | Middlesex | Nantucket | Norfolk | Plymouth | Suffolk | Worcester

This National Park Service list is complete through NPS recent listings posted July 17, 2026.

== Cities and towns in northern Worcester County ==
| | Name on the Register | Image | Date listed | Location | City or town | Description |
|---|---|---|---|---|---|---|
| 1 | Academy Street Educational Historic District | | September 26, 2025 (#100012289) | 62, 82, and 98 Academy Street; 0 Elm Street; 0 Wallace Way; 42°35′11″N 71°48′10″W | Fitchburg | |
| 2 | Ashburnham Center Historic District | Ashburnham Center Historic District | January 27, 1999 (#99000050) | Roughly along MA 12 and MA 101 in Ashburnham; 42°38′30″N 71°54′43″W | Ashburnham | |
| 3 | Atherton Bridge | Atherton Bridge | September 19, 1979 (#79000377) | Bolton Rd. 42°26′40″N 71°40′21″W | Lancaster | |
| 4 | Athol High School | Athol High School | February 18, 2011 (#11000022) | 494 School St. 42°35′40″N 72°13′13″W | Athol | This building, which is now residential, is not to be confused with the current high school. |
| 5 | Baldwinville Village Historic District | Baldwinville Village Historic District | February 27, 1986 (#86000273) | Roughly Elm and S. Main Sts. between Pleasant St. and Mt. View; 42°36′18″N 72°04′38″W | Templeton | |
| 6 | Calvinistic Congregational Church | Calvinistic Congregational Church | June 15, 1979 (#79000371) | 820 Main St. 42°35′06″N 71°48′19″W | Fitchburg | |
| 7 | Cambridge Grant Historic District | Cambridge Grant Historic District | August 20, 2001 (#01000626) | 205-287 Russell Hill Rd., 15 Wilker Rd. 42°38′41″N 71°51′44″W | Ashburnham | |
| 8 | Center Village District | Center Village District | September 15, 1977 (#77000198) | Irregular pattern along Main St. 42°27′26″N 71°40′19″W | Lancaster | |
| 9 | Cluett Peabody & Company | Cluett Peabody & Company | June 8, 1989 (#89000439) | 123 1st St. 42°31′34″N 71°45′11″W | Leominster | |
| 10 | Crocker Field Historic District | Crocker Field Historic District | June 14, 2001 (#01000651) | River St. 42°35′44″N 71°48′34″W | Fitchburg | |
| 11 | Frances H. and Jonathan Drake House | Frances H. and Jonathan Drake House | January 29, 2008 (#07001488) | 21 Franklin St. 42°31′20″N 71°45′41″W | Leominster | Underground Railroad in Massachusetts MPS |
| 12 | Duck Mill | Duck Mill | May 9, 1985 (#85000982) | 60 Duck Mill Rd. 42°34′05″N 71°46′48″W | Fitchburg | |
| 13 | Earl Company Factory | | August 19, 2025 (#100012151) | 34 Tremaine Street; 42°31′53″N 71°45′14″W | Leominster | |
| 14 | Eastwood Cemetery | | May 7, 2024 (#100010282) | Old Common-Wilder Road; 42°26′27″N 71°39′19″W | Lancaster | Extends into Bolton. |
| 15 | Elm Street Fire Station | Elm Street Fire Station | April 2, 1980 (#80001677) | 58 Elm St. 42°34′40″N 71°59′08″W | Gardner | |
| 16 | Fay Club | Fay Club | January 31, 1978 (#78000470) | 658 Main St. 42°34′59″N 71°48′09″W | Fitchburg | |
| 17 | First Church of Christ, Lancaster | First Church of Christ, Lancaster | December 30, 1970 (#70000897) | Facing the Common; 42°27′22″N 71°40′25″W | Lancaster | National Historic Landmark |
| 18 | First Minister's House | First Minister's House | November 14, 1979 (#79000372) | 186 Elm St. 42°34′26″N 71°59′00″W | Gardner | |
| 19 | Fitchburg Historical Society | Fitchburg Historical Society | October 3, 2003 (#03000992) | 50 Grove St. 42°35′04″N 71°48′10″W | Fitchburg | |
| 20 | Fitchburg Paper Company Historic District | | July 22, 2026 (#100013245) | 601, 642, 644, 696, 704, and 714 River Street; 0 Westminster Street; 42°34′44″N 71°49′51″W | Fitchburg | |
| 21 | Fitchburg Yarn Mill | Fitchburg Yarn Mill | December 6, 2016 (#16000817) | 1428 Main St. 42°35′15″N 71°48′48″W | Fitchburg | |
| 22 | Fort Devens Historic District | Fort Devens Historic District | June 10, 1993 (#93000437) | Roughly bounded by El Caney St., Antietam St., Sherman Ave., MacArthur Ave. and Buena Vista St. 42°32′46″N 71°36′46″W | Harvard | Extends into Ayer, Middlesex County |
| 23 | Founder's Hall | Founder's Hall | April 14, 1980 (#80001678) | Atlantic Union College Campus; 42°26′42″N 71°41′10″W | Lancaster | |
| 24 | Fruitlands | Fruitlands | March 19, 1974 (#74001761) | Prospect Hill; 42°30′34″N 71°36′45″W | Harvard | National Historic Landmark |
| 25 | Fruitlands Museums Historic District | Fruitlands Museums Historic District | May 23, 1997 (#97000439) | 102 Prospect Hill Rd. 42°29′37″N 71°36′47″W | Harvard | |
| 26 | Garbose Building | Garbose Building | April 12, 1983 (#83000609) | 3 Pleasant St. 42°34′33″N 71°59′46″W | Gardner | |
| 27 | Gardner News Building | Gardner News Building | November 14, 1979 (#79000373) | 309 Central St. 42°34′35″N 71°59′44″W | Gardner | |
| 28 | Gardner Uptown Historic District | Gardner Uptown Historic District | June 3, 1999 (#99000660) | Roughly along Central, Cross, Elm, Green. Glazier, Pearl and Woodland Sts. 42°34′40″N 71°59′04″W | Gardner | |
| 29 | Harvard Center Historic District | Harvard Center Historic District | September 22, 1997 (#97001091) | Ayer, Still River, Old Littleton, Bolton and Oak Hill Rds, Elm and Fairbanks Sts, Lovers Ln., Mass. Ave. and Old Boston; 42°29′52″N 71°35′01″W | Harvard | |
| 30 | Harvard Shaker Village Historic District | Harvard Shaker Village Historic District | October 30, 1989 (#89001871) | Roughly Shaker Rd., S. Shaker Rd., and Maple Ln. 42°31′57″N 71°33′33″W | Harvard | |
| 31 | Levi Heywood Memorial Library Building | Levi Heywood Memorial Library Building | December 6, 1979 (#79000374) | 28 Pearl St. 42°34′46″N 71°59′09″W | Gardner | Now houses the Gardner Museum. |
| 32 | Heywood-Wakefield Company Complex | Heywood-Wakefield Company Complex | September 15, 1983 (#83000610) | 206 Central St. 42°34′35″N 71°59′27″W | Gardner | |
| 33 | Jewett Piano Company Building | Jewett Piano Company Building | November 1, 2019 (#100004559) | 140 Adams St. 42°31′33″N 71°45′53″W | Leominster | |
| 34 | Lake Street Fire Station | Lake Street Fire Station | March 25, 1980 (#80001676) | 2 Lake St. 42°34′37″N 71°59′42″W | Gardner | |
| 35 | Lancaster Industrial School for Girls | Lancaster Industrial School for Girls | October 8, 1976 (#76000301) | Southeast of Lancaster on Old Common Rd. 42°26′35″N 71°39′30″W | Lancaster | |
| 36 | Anthony Lane House | Anthony Lane House | November 7, 1976 (#76000300) | Northeast of Lancaster on Seven Bridge Rd. 42°27′54″N 71°39′58″W | Lancaster | |
| 37 | Leominster High School | Leominster High School | February 1, 2021 (#100006083) | 261 West St. 42°31′57″N 71°46′21″W | Leominster | The former Carter Junior High School building. |
| 38 | Lunenburg Historic District | Lunenburg Historic District | August 24, 1988 (#87001060) | Leominster Rd., Highland St., Oak and Massachusetts Aves., Main St., and Lancaster Ave. 42°35′42″N 71°43′32″W | Lunenburg | |
| 39 | Middle Cemetery | Middle Cemetery | November 8, 2019 (#100004560) | Main St. 42°26′59″N 71°40′30″W | Lancaster | |
| 40 | Miss Toy Town Diner | Miss Toy Town Diner | December 4, 2003 (#03001242) | 102 Main St. 42°34′27″N 71°59′41″W | Gardner | |
| 41 | Monument Park Historic District | Monument Park Historic District | May 16, 1978 (#78000478) | Monument Park and environs north of Main St. 42°35′01″N 71°48′06″W | Fitchburg | |
| 42 | Monument Square Historic District | Monument Square Historic District | July 8, 1982 (#82004474) | Main and Water Sts. and Grove Ave. 42°31′37″N 71°45′37″W | Leominster | |
| 43 | Moran Square Historic District | Moran Square Historic District | January 4, 2018 (#100001951) | Myrtle Ave., Sawyer Passway, Summer, Lunenburg, Main & Willow Sts. 42°34′54″N 71°47′26″W | Fitchburg | |
| 44 | Murdock School | Murdock School | January 28, 1988 (#87002562) | Murdock Ave. 42°41′07″N 72°03′15″W | Winchendon | |
| 45 | North Burial Ground | North Burial Ground | July 24, 2024 (#100010567) | Old Union Turnpike; 42°30′48″N 71°39′45″W | Lancaster | |
| 46 | North Village Cemetery | | October 28, 2024 (#100010942) | Otis St. 42°28′21″N 71°40′29″W | Lancaster | |
| 47 | North Village Historic District | North Village Historic District | November 23, 1977 (#77000199) | N. Main St. 42°28′16″N 71°40′45″W | Lancaster | |
| 48 | Old Centre Historic District | Old Centre Historic District | September 18, 1987 (#87000901) | Roughly Old County and Baldwinsville Rds., Hale St., and Teel Rd. 42°39′43″N 72°02′21″W | Winchendon | |
| 49 | Old Common Burial Ground | | May 7, 2024 (#100010283) | Four Corners-Old Common Road; 42°26′34″N 71°39′53″W | Lancaster | |
| 50 | Old Settlers' Burying Ground | Old Settlers' Burying Ground | November 8, 2019 (#100004558) | Off Main St. 42°26′56″N 71°40′22″W | Lancaster | |
| 51 | Old Town Hall | Old Town Hall | June 17, 1987 (#87000876) | 1307 Main St. 42°35′32″N 72°13′05″W | Athol | Home to the Athol Historic Society. |
| 52 | Parkhill Mill | Parkhill Mill | February 20, 2008 (#08000090) | 1 Oak Hill Rd. 42°34′51″N 71°49′18″W | Fitchburg | |
| 53 | Jabez Partridge Homestead | Jabez Partridge Homestead | December 6, 1979 (#79000375) | 81 Partridge Rd. 42°33′30″N 71°58′15″W | Gardner | |
| 54 | Pequoig Hotel | Pequoig Hotel | November 17, 1978 (#78000469) | Main St. 42°35′39″N 72°13′53″W | Athol | |
| 55 | Phillipston Center Historic District | Phillipston Center Historic District | November 22, 1999 (#99001385) | Roughly along The Common, Baldwinville, Petersham and Templeton Rds. 42°33′03″N 72°08′13″W | Phillipston | |
| 56 | Sylvester K. Pierce House | Sylvester K. Pierce House | December 1, 2022 (#100008420) | 4 West Broadway; 42°33′27″N 71°58′51″W | Gardner | |
| 57 | Pine Grove Cemetery | Pine Grove Cemetery | March 12, 2008 (#08000168) | Tremaine and Main Sts. 42°31′54″N 71°45′21″W | Leominster | |
| 58 | Ponakin Bridge | Ponakin Bridge | September 10, 1979 (#79000378) | North of Lancaster off Ponakin Rd. 42°28′52″N 71°41′09″W | Lancaster | |
| 59 | W. S. Reed Toy Company-Wachusett Shirt Company Historic District | W. S. Reed Toy Company-Wachusett Shirt Company Historic District | November 24, 2021 (#100006863) | 41-45 Summer St. 42°31′42″N 71°45′24″W | Leominster | |
| 60 | Royalston Common Historic District | Royalston Common Historic District | December 12, 1976 (#76000304) | Main St., Frye Hill Rd., and Athol Rd. 42°40′39″N 72°11′18″W | Royalston | |
| 61 | Safety Fund National Bank | Safety Fund National Bank | April 30, 2009 (#09000252) | 470 Main St. 42°34′57″N 71°47′57″W | Fitchburg | |
| 62 | Searles Hill Cemetery | Searles Hill Cemetery | September 15, 2011 (#11000665) | Searles Hill Rd. 42°31′54″N 72°07′35″W | Phillipston | |
| 63 | Shirley Shaker Village | Shirley Shaker Village | May 24, 1976 (#76000271) | South of Shirley on Harvard Rd. 42°31′35″N 71°39′06″W | Lancaster | Extends into Shirley in Middlesex County. |
| 64 | F.W. Smith Silver Company | F.W. Smith Silver Company | November 14, 1979 (#79000376) | 60 Chestnut St. 42°34′43″N 71°59′14″W | Gardner | |
| 65 | South Lancaster Engine House | South Lancaster Engine House | October 22, 1976 (#76000307) | 283 S. Main St. 42°26′35″N 71°41′06″W | South Lancaster | |
| 66 | Still River Baptist Church | Still River Baptist Church | December 13, 1996 (#96001479) | 213 Still River Rd. 42°29′29″N 71°37′04″W | Harvard | |
| 67 | Templeton Common Historic District | Templeton Common Historic District | July 7, 1983 (#83000608) | Athol, Gardner, Hubbardston, Dudley, Wellington, and South Rds. 42°33′21″N 72°04′07″W | Templeton | |
| 68 | Templeton Farm Colony | Templeton Farm Colony | January 21, 1994 (#93001485) | 126 Royalston Rd. 42°35′59″N 72°07′08″W | Templeton | |
| 69 | Nathaniel Thayer Estate | Nathaniel Thayer Estate | July 6, 1976 (#76000302) | 438 S. Main St. 42°26′59″N 71°40′43″W | Lancaster | |
| 70 | Wachusett Shirt Company | Wachusett Shirt Company | July 8, 1982 (#82004476) | 97-100 Water St. 42°31′39″N 71°45′23″W | Leominster | |
| 71 | Frederick Fiske and Gretchen Osgood Warren House | Frederick Fiske and Gretchen Osgood Warren House | December 6, 1996 (#96001466) | 42 Bolton Rd. 42°29′21″N 71°35′06″W | Harvard | |
| 72 | Wellington Piano Case Company Building | Wellington Piano Case Company Building | May 31, 1984 (#84002922) | 54 Green St. 42°32′06″N 71°45′21″W | Leominster | |
| 73 | West Gardner Square Historic District | West Gardner Square Historic District | December 30, 1985 (#85003185) | Roughly bounded by City Hall Ave., Pleasant, Connors, Parker, and Central Sts., and Providence & Worcester Railroad tracks. 42°34′29″N 71°59′43″W | Gardner | |
| 74 | Westminster Village-Academy Hill Historic District | Westminster Village-Academy Hill Historic District | June 23, 1983 (#83000612) | Bacon, Adams, Main, Dawley, Academy Hill, Leominster, and Pleasant Sts. 42°32′37″N 71°54′41″W | Westminster | |
| 75 | Enoch Whitmore House | Enoch Whitmore House | January 9, 2008 (#07001362) | 12 Daniels Ln. 42°41′24″N 71°58′15″W | Ashburnham | Underground Railroad in Massachusetts MPS |
| 76 | Whitney & Company | Whitney & Company | June 8, 1989 (#89000440) | 142 Water St. 42°31′42″N 71°45′13″W | Leominster | |
| 77 | Whitney Tavern | Whitney Tavern | June 12, 1996 (#96000304) | 11 Patriots Rd. 42°33′53″N 72°01′37″W | Gardner and Templeton | |
| 78 | F. A. Whitney Carriage Company Complex Historic District | F. A. Whitney Carriage Company Complex Historic District | June 23, 1988 (#88000716) | Off 124 Water St. 42°31′45″N 71°45′18″W | Leominster | |
| 79 | Winchendon Village Historic District | Winchendon Village Historic District | September 1, 1993 (#92000056) | Roughly, N side Central St. from Summer to Front Sts. and N side Front from Academy to Spring Sts. 42°40′54″N 72°03′00″W | Winchendon | |
| 80 | Ahijah Wood House | Ahijah Wood House | September 17, 1987 (#87000374) | 175 Worcester Rd. 42°31′21″N 71°53′35″W | Westminster | Incorrectly listed at 174 Worcester Rd. |
| 81 | Ezra Wood-Levi Warner Place | Ezra Wood-Levi Warner Place | July 7, 1983 (#83000614) | 165 Depot Rd. 42°33′28″N 71°52′23″W | Westminster | |
| 82 | Nathan Wood House | Nathan Wood House | September 16, 1987 (#87000375) | 164 Worcester Rd. 42°31′19″N 71°53′30″W | Westminster | |

== See also ==
- List of National Historic Landmarks in Massachusetts
