= Charles D. Copp =

United States Army soldier (1840–1912)

- Born: April 12, 1840; Warren County, New Hampshire
- Died: November 2, 1912 (aged 72)
- Burial place: Middle Cemetery
- Military career
- Allegiance: United States of America
- Branch: United States Army
- Rank: Captain
- Unit: 9th Regiment New Hampshire Volunteer Infantry
- Conflicts: Battle of Fredericksburg
- Awards: Medal of Honor

Charles Dearborne Copp (April 12, 1840 – November 2, 1912) was an American soldier who fought in the American Civil War. Copp received the country's highest award for bravery during combat, the Medal of Honor, for his action during the Battle of Fredericksburg in Virginia on December 13, 1862. He was honored with the award on June 28, 1890.

== Biography ==
Copp was born in Warren County, New Hampshire on April 12, 1840. He enlisted into the 9th New Hampshire Infantry.

After the Civil War, Copp became a companion of the Massachusetts Commandery of the Military Order of the Loyal Legion of the United States.

He died on November 2, 1912, and his remains are interred at the Middle Cemetery in Lancaster, Massachusetts.

== Medal of Honor citation ==
Seized the regimental colors, the color bearer having been shot down, and, waving them, rallied the regiment under a heavy fire.

== See also ==
- List of American Civil War Medal of Honor recipients: A–F
