= Pine Grove Cemetery =

Pine Grove Cemetery may refer to:

- Pine Grove Cemetery (Brunswick, Maine)
- Pine Grove Cemetery (Leominster, Massachusetts), listed on the U.S. National Register of Historic Places (NRHP)
- Pine Grove Cemetery (Lynn, Massachusetts), NRHP-listed
- Pine Grove Cemetery (Truro, Massachusetts), NRHP-listed
