= Sylvester K. Pierce House =

Historic house in Massachusetts, United States

- U.S. National Register of Historic Places
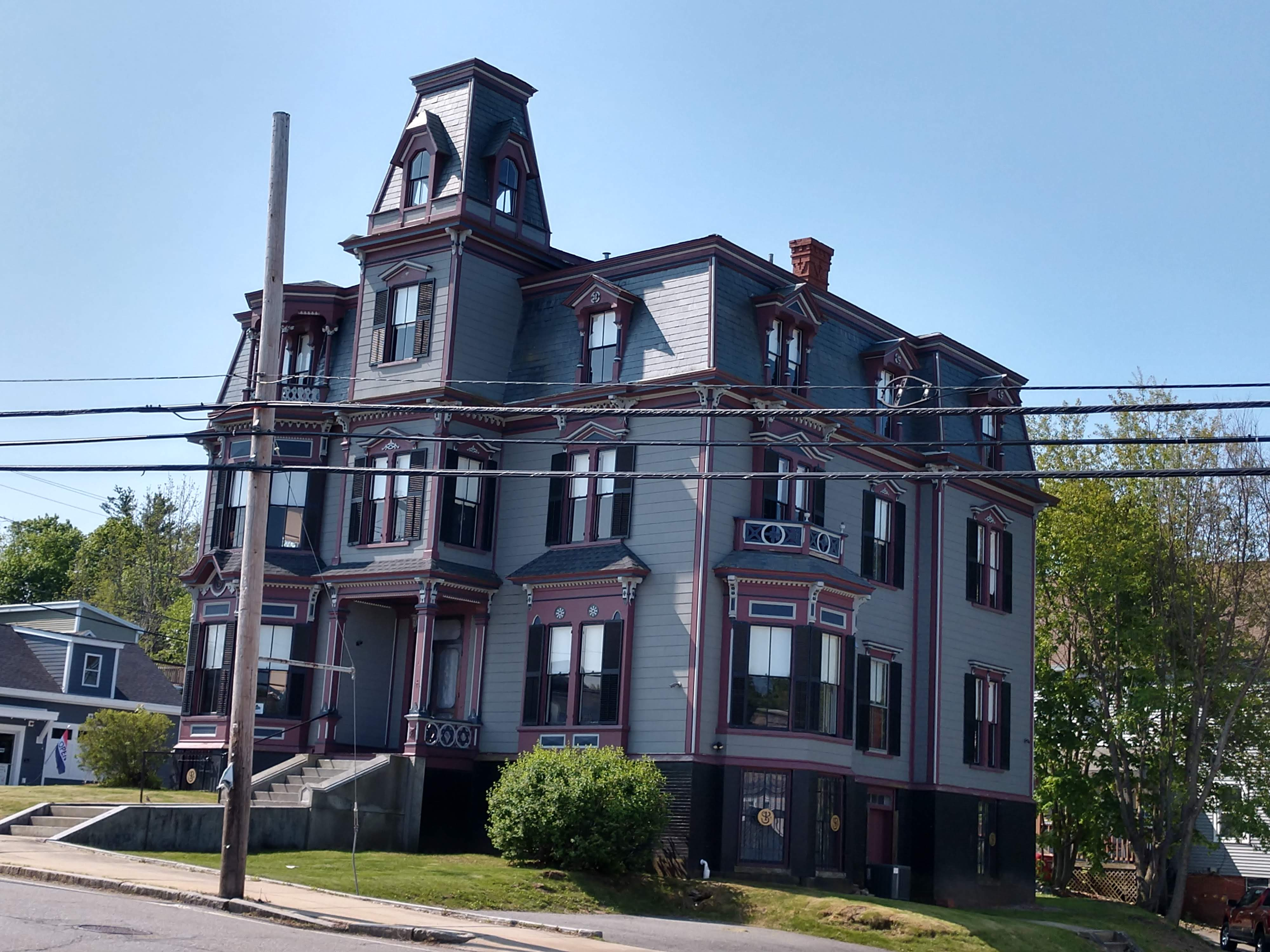

- Location within Massachusetts Location within the United States
- Location: 4 West Broadway, Gardner, Massachusetts
- Coordinates: 42°33′26.946″N 71°58′50.8116″W
- Area: less than one acre
- Built: 1873
- Architect: E. Boyden & Son
- Architectural style: Second Empire
- NRHP reference No.: 100008420
- Added to NRHP: December 1, 2022

The Sylvester K. Pierce House, also known as the SK Pierce Victorian Mansion, or just the Victorian Haunted Mansion, is a historic house at 4 West Broadway in Gardner, Massachusetts. Built between 1873 and 1875 for a local chair manufacturer, it is a prominent local example of Second Empire architecture and is well-known for reports of paranormal activity. It was listed on the National Register of Historic Places in 2022. The historic mansion was listed for sale in 2015 with a price of $329,000.

== Description and history ==
The S.K. Pierce House is located in the village center of South Gardner, on the south side of West Broadway abutting Union Street, and across from the South Main Street junction where East Broadway meets South Main, also otherwise known as Route 2A. At nearly 7,000 square feet, its ceilings are 11 feet tall, there are 10 bedrooms and 2.5 baths, and its main block is a 2 1/2-story frame structure with a mansard roof and clapboarded exterior. A four-story tower, also topped by a mansard roof, rises from the center bay of the front facade. The main facade is three bays wide with projecting polygonal window bays of decreasing size to the left of the tower and paired sash windows to the right. The entrance is flanked by paneled posts which support the tower and provide an entrance shelter. The exterior of the building has elaborately detailed woodwork, a feature that can also be found inside where most of the original woodwork and hardware have been preserved through an extensive restoration effort.

The house was built between 1873 and 1875 for Sylvester K. Pierce (1820-1888), a native of Westminster, who moved to Gardner and became involved in the locally-prominent chair manufacturing business which eventually would lend Gardner its "Chair City" title. He purchased his own factory at the age of 25, located just across the street from the site of this house, and became one of the city's most successful businessmen of the period. This house was designed and built for his family by E. Boyden & Son, a prominent Worcester architect, and took three years of painstakingly detailed work to complete. Pierce's son converted the house into an inn, with visitors including former United States president Calvin Coolidge, artist, Norman Rockwell, and a number of stars from stage and screen. The building declined during the 20th century, but its features were sufficiently preserved enough that an early 21st century restoration returned it to its previous grandeur. The current owners offer tours of the house and opportunities to spend the night in search of alleged paranormal activity.

== See also ==
- National Register of Historic Places listings in northern Worcester County, Massachusetts
