= Whitney & Company (Leominster, Massachusetts) =

- U.S. National Register of Historic Places
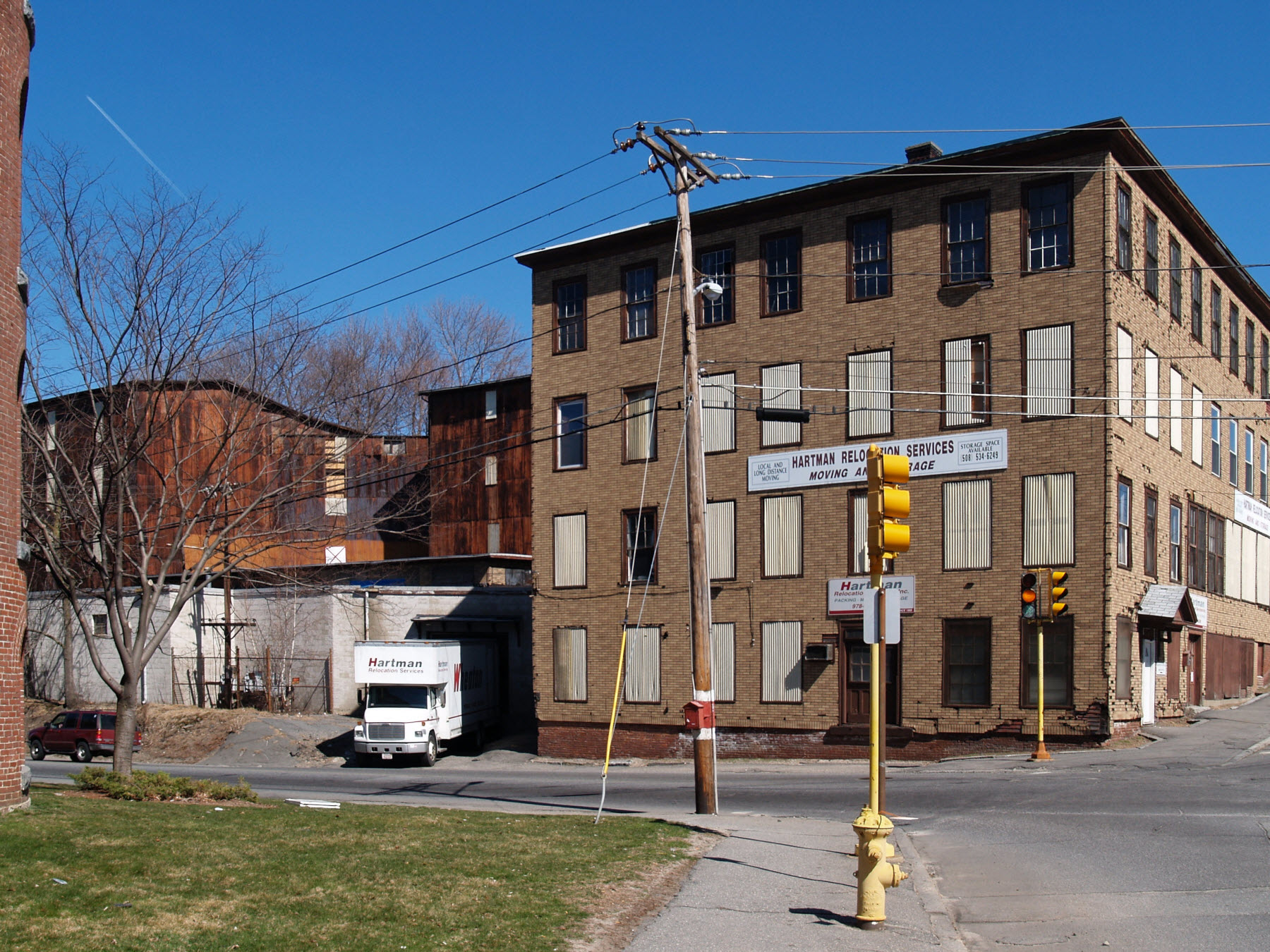

- Location within Massachusetts Location within the United States
- Location: 142 Water St., Leominster, Massachusetts
- Coordinates: 42°31′42″N 71°45′13″W
- Area: less than one acre
- Built: 1893
- Architectural style: Queen Anne
- NRHP reference No.: 89000440
- Added to NRHP: June 8, 1989

The Whitney & Company building is a historic industrial facility in Leominster, Massachusetts. The utilitarian brick four-story building was built in 1893, and extended in 1923. It was built by Fred Abbot Whitney and Walther F. Whitney, whose business was the manufacture of boxes, notably paper boxes and satin-lined boxes, used for shipping other products to customers. The site was listed on the National Register of Historic Places in 1989. It has since been converted into residences called the Watermill Apartments.

== Description and history ==
The Whitney & Company facility is located northeast of downtown Leominster, on a parcel bounded by Whitney, Water, and Oak Streets. The surviving building of the complex is a long wood-frame structure, on the north side of Water Street. It is finished in wooden clapboards, and is nominally three stories in height, with part of its basement fully exposed on the Whitney Street side. Near the center of the Water Street facade is a four-story tower with a shallow-pitch hip roof. The northern portion of the parcel originally housed 20th-century additions to the plant; these have been removed, and the space now serves as parking for the building residents.

The Whitney Brothers who had this plant built were sons of Frederick Whitney, who had established the F. A. Whitney Carriage Company located across Whitney Street. The brothers had begun the manufacture of boxes in 1886 in a building nearer downtown Leominster. The business was a success, and this plant was built in 1893 to house its operations. It underwent a number of expansions in the 1910s and 1920s, manufacturing all manner and style of folding boxes, used for the shipment of goods such as shirts and combs, which were produced in other Leominster factories. The business continued in operation on these premises until 1961. It is the largest of Leominster's surviving wood-frame industrial plants.

== See also ==
- National Register of Historic Places listings in Worcester County, Massachusetts
