= Moran Square Historic District =

Historic district in Massachusetts, United States

- U.S. National Register of Historic Places
- U.S. Historic district
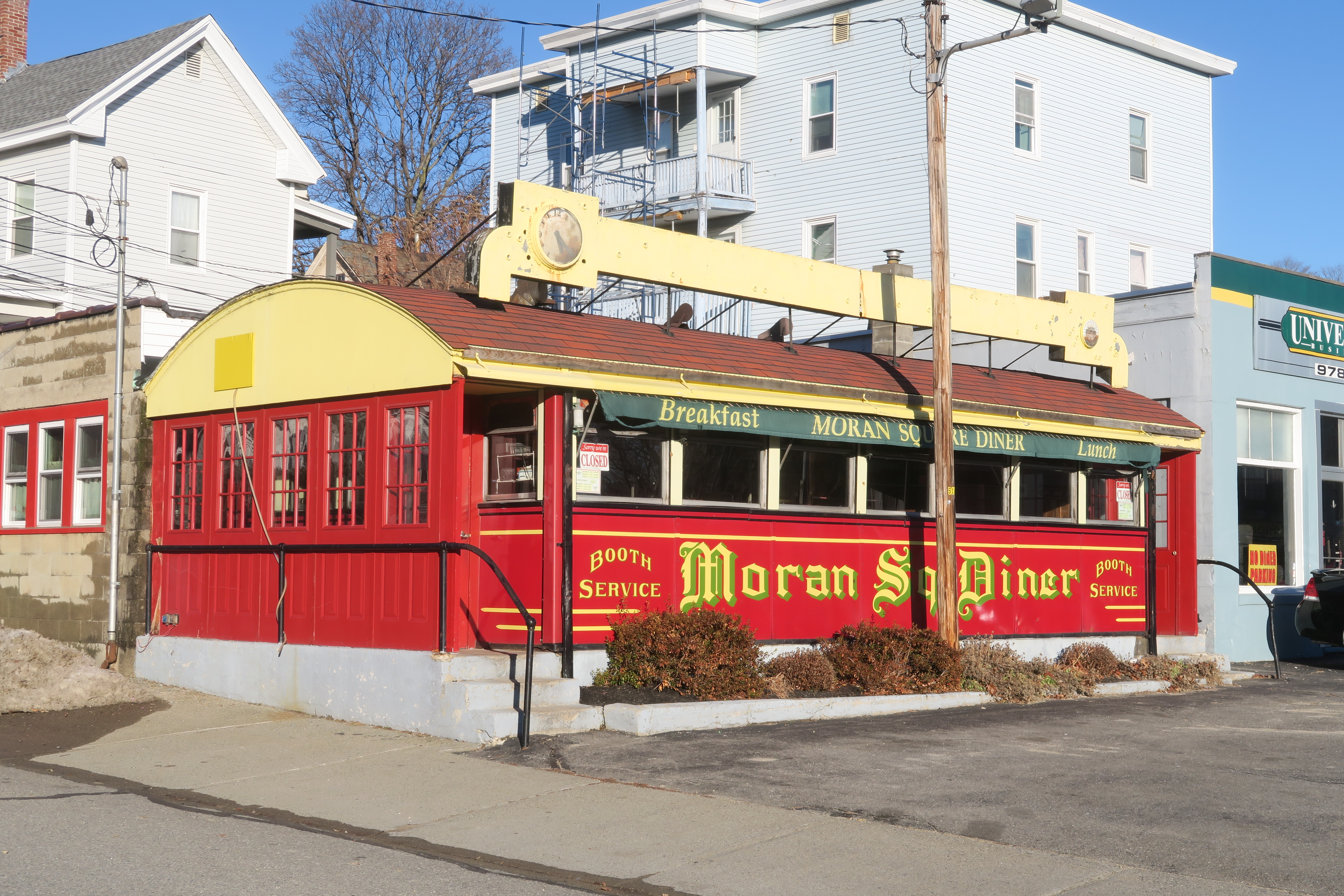
- Moran Square Diner

- Location within Massachusetts Location within the United States
- Location: E. Main, Lunenburg, and Summer Sts., Fitchburg, Massachusetts
- Coordinates: 42°34′54″N 71°47′26″W
- Area: 12 acres (4.9 ha)
- NRHP reference No.: 100001951
- Added to NRHP: January 4, 2018

The Moran Square Historic District is a historic district encompassing an area of late 19th and early 20th-century industrial, commercial, and residential development in Fitchburg, Massachusetts. Centered on the triangular junction of East Main Street with Lunenburg and Summer Streets, this area developed as a secondary node apart from the city's main commercial district (located just 0.25 miles (0.40 km) to the west), in an area were several industrial plants were undergoing significant growth. The district was listed on the National Register of Historic Places in 2018.

== Description and history ==
The city of Fitchburg has an industrial history extending to the 18th century, when saw and grist mills were erected along the Nashua River. Textile mills followed in the early 19th century, and larger-scale industrial development was spurred by the construction of the railroad through the city in 1844. Moran Square developed as a commercial and industrial hub just east of the city's Union Station, flourishing during the height of the city's prosperity. The major industrial development was spearheaded by Sylvanus Sawyer, who in 1860 built the district's oldest factory building, at 64 Main Street. He also built a fine Second Empire house, which still stands at 21-23 Summer Street. Sawyer's company manufactured munitions and weapons during the American Civil War, and was joined by other metalworking firms in the following decades. These industries did well through the 1920s, but began a decline in the Great Depression from which they never fully recovered.

The historic district is roughly linear, extending southward along Summer Street and Sawyer Passway from Main Street. Fingers extend north and northeast along Lunenburg Street and Willow Street. The district is about 12 acres (4.9 ha) in size, with 33 historically significant buildings. It includes the Moran Square Diner, a well-preserved 1939 diner built by the Worcester Lunch Car Company, and the Moran Block, a mixed residential-commercial block at the main junction that was built in 1908.

== See also ==
- National Register of Historic Places listings in northern Worcester County, Massachusetts
