= W. S. Reed Toy Company-Wachusett Shirt Company Historic District =

Historic district in Massachusetts, United States

- U.S. National Register of Historic Places
- U.S. Historic district
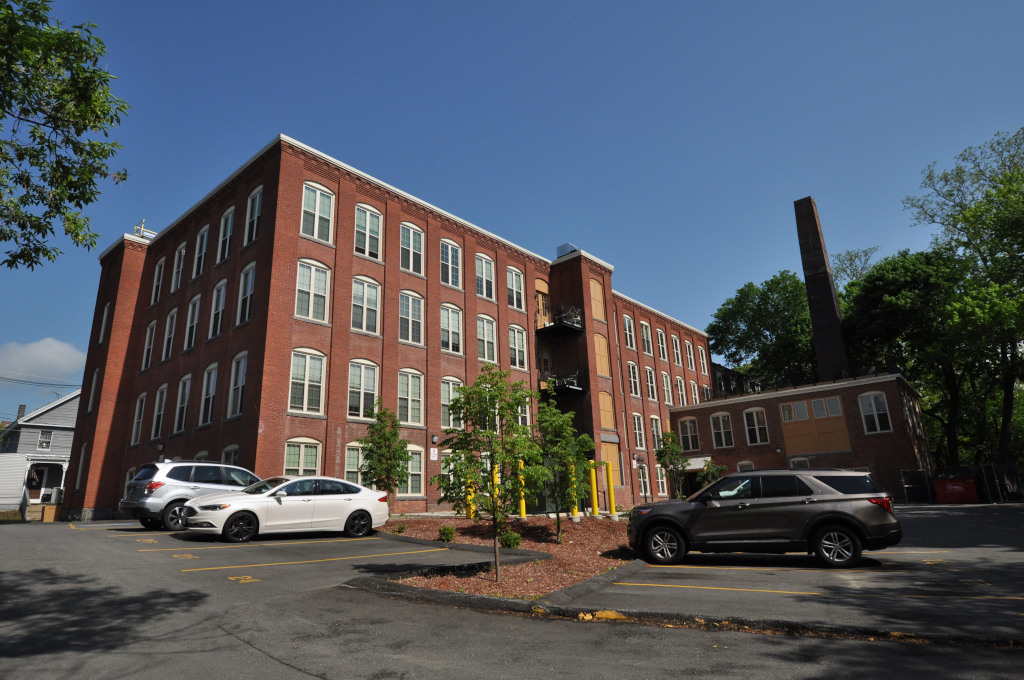

- Location within Massachusetts Location within the United States
- Location: 41-45 Summer St., Leominster, Massachusetts
- Coordinates: 42°31′42″N 71°45′24″W
- Built: c. 1840
- Architectural style: Second Empire
- NRHP reference No.: 100006863
- Added to NRHP: November 24, 2021

The W. S. Reed Toy Company-Wachusett Shirt Company Historic District encompasses two adjacent properties at 41 and 45 Summer Street in Leominster, Massachusetts. The two properties were historically associated with the business operations of William S. Reed, a businessman who operated a toy manufacturing company among other concerns. The properties were listed as a historic district on the National Register of Historic Places in 2021.

== Description and history ==
William S. Reed was a native of Sterling, Massachusetts who came to Leominster in 1872, and soon afterward introduced the manufacture of toys to the city, at first wooden blocks. Some of his early manufacturing may have taken place in the brick house at 41 Summer Street, built in 1840. In 1879 he acquired factory properties on what is now Summer Street from J.C. Lane and Emerson Prescott, which had formerly served as furniture and comb factories. The following year he built the oldest surviving portion of what is now 45 Summer Street, a multi-story Second Empire brick factory building.

Reed expanded his business into another adjacent factory in 1891, but it was destroyed by fire the following year. A second fire in 1896 destroyed even more of his plant, and the company was subsequently folded into the Whitney Reed Chair Company, a maker of rattan and reed furniture. Reed later became involved in the construction and operation of streetcar networks in the region.

The plant was acquired by Francis Whitney in 1900, first housing his United States Thread Company, and then serving as the number 3 mill of the Wachusett Shirt Company. That company operated here at least until the mid-1950s; its principal plant was located across Monoosnuc Brook, which was joined to this property by a footbridge.

== See also ==
- National Register of Historic Places listings in Worcester County, Massachusetts
