= Elm Street Fire Station =

- U.S. National Register of Historic Places
- U.S. Historic district – Contributing property
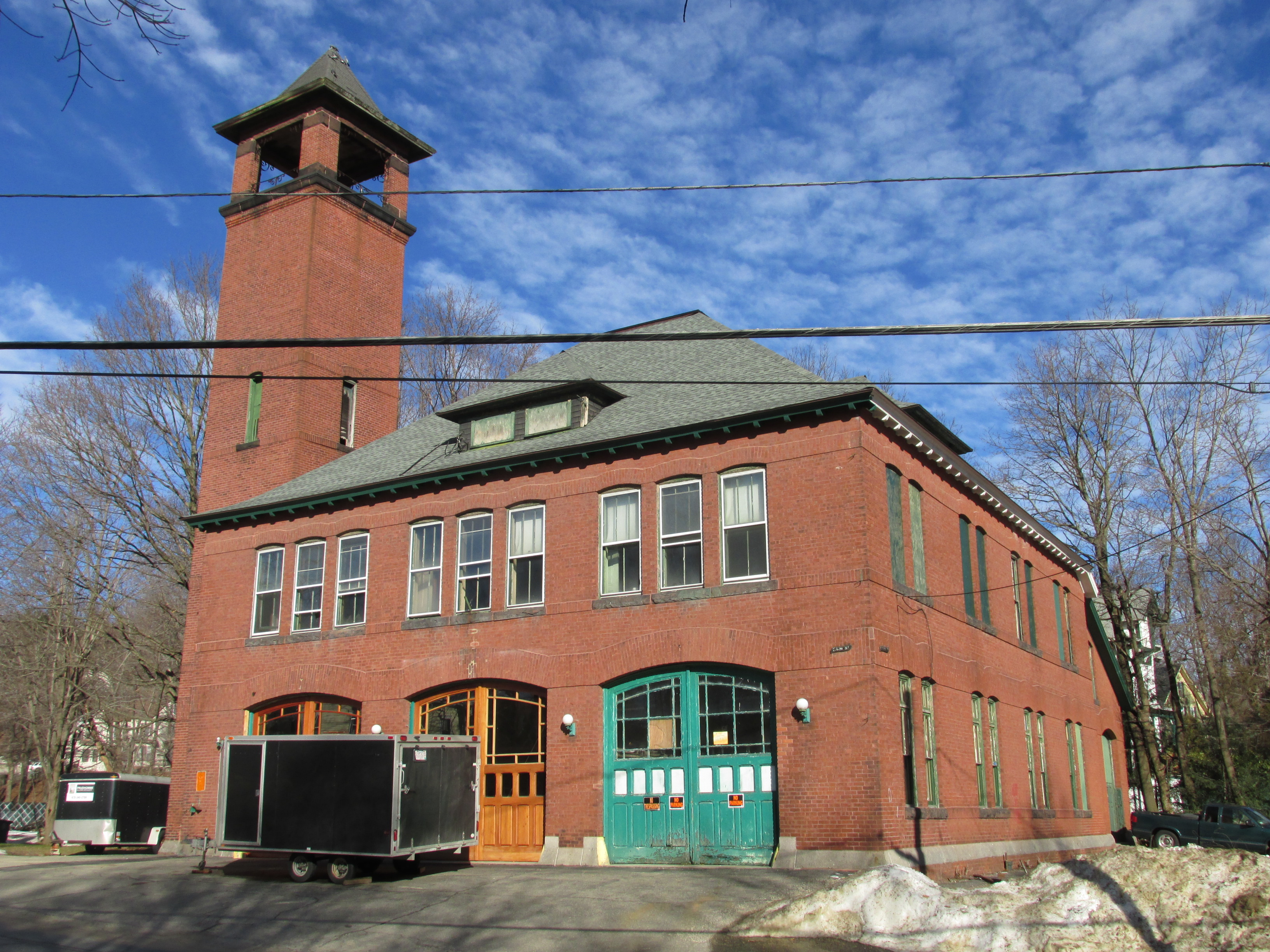
- Elm Street Fire Station

- Location within Massachusetts Location within the United States
- Location: 58 Elm St., Gardner, Massachusetts
- Coordinates: 42°34′40″N 71°59′8″W
- Area: less than one acre
- Built: 1897
- Architectural style: Late Victorian
- Part of: Gardner Uptown Historic District (ID99000660)
- NRHP reference No.: 80001677

Significant dates
- Added to NRHP: April 2, 1980
- Designated CP: June 3, 1999

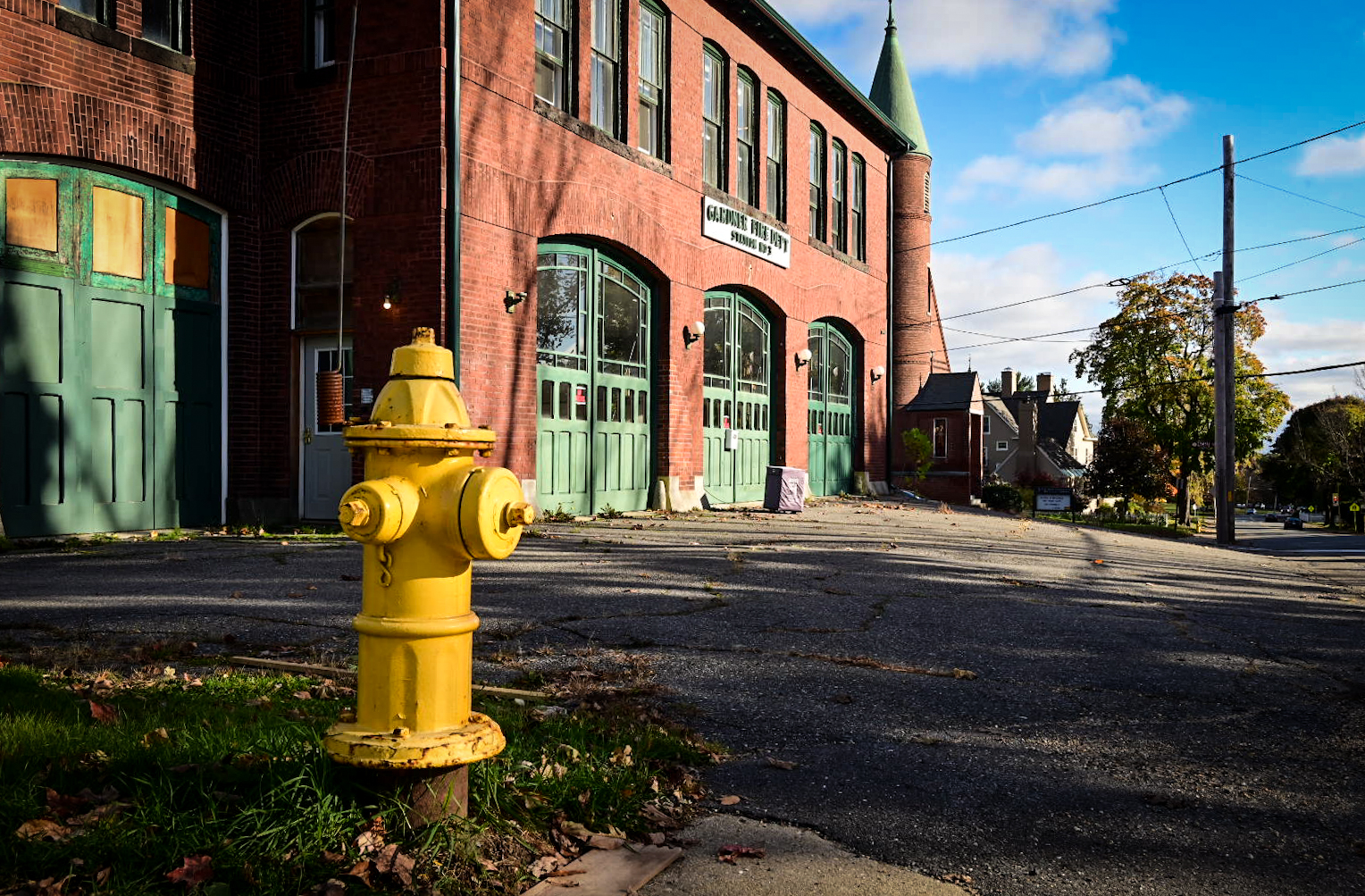
The old Elm Street fire station in Gardner MA

The Elm Street Fire Station is a historic fire station in Gardner, Massachusetts. Built in 1897, it is a little-altered example of a Late Victorian fire station, with a number of distinctive period features. The station was listed on the National Register of Historic Places in 1980, at which time it was still in active service. It was included in the Gardner Uptown Historic District in 1999. The building is presently vacant.

== Description and history ==
The Elm Street Fire Station stands in a residential area east of downtown Gardner, at the northeast corner of Elm and Cherry Streets. It is a 2-1/2 story brick building, with hip roof. At its left front corner, a square tower rises four stories, with an open belfry at the top and a pyramidal roof with flared eaves. The front facade houses three equipment bays on the ground floor, each with original double-leaf glazed wooden doors set in segmented-arch openings. The second floor has bands of three windows set above each bay, with stone sills and segmented-arch headers. The main roof eave is lined with modillion blocks.

When it was built in 1897, the building had a number of innovative features. It used a distinctive suspension system to support the building's second story without the need for columns, using steel rods attached to the load bearing outside walls. Other interior facilities include systems for automatically dropping harnesses onto waiting horses, which were at the time the means by which fire equipment was moved.

== See also ==
- National Register of Historic Places listings in Worcester County, Massachusetts
