= Jabez Partridge Homestead =

Historic house in Massachusetts, United States

- U.S. National Register of Historic Places
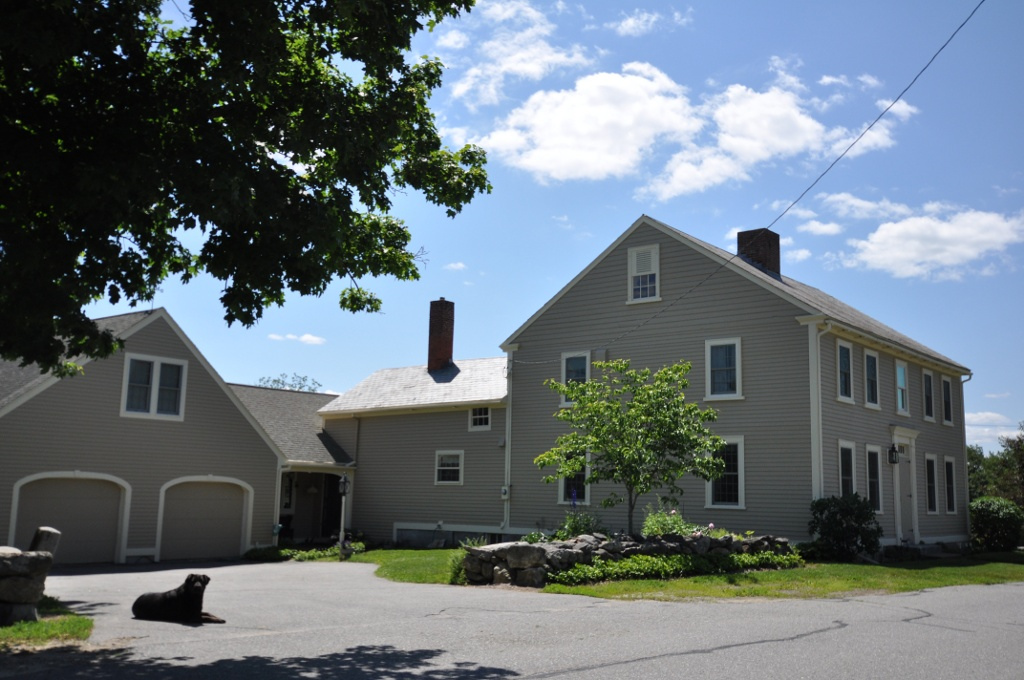

- Location within Massachusetts Location within the United States
- Location: 81 Partridge Rd., Gardner, Massachusetts
- Coordinates: 42°33′30″N 71°58′15″W
- Area: 28.8 acres (11.7 ha)
- Built: c. 1772
- Architectural style: Federal
- NRHP reference No.: 79000375
- Added to NRHP: December 6, 1979

The Jabez Partridge Homestead is an historic farmstead at 81 Partridge Road in Gardner, Massachusetts. With its oldest part dating to about 1772, it is one of the oldest buildings in the town, built by an early settler, and is a good example of Federal period architecture. It was listed on the National Register of Historic Places in 1979.

== Description and history ==
The Jabez Partridge Homestead is located in a rural area of southern Gardner, on the east side of Partridge Road. Its main block is a 2 1/2-story frame structure, with a gabled roof, central chimney, and clapboarded exterior. The main facade is five bays wide, with windows arranged symmetrically around a center entrance. The entrance is flanked by pilasters and topped by a transom window and corniced entablature. Attached to the rear of this block is an older 1 1/2-story frame building, also finished in clapboards. A barn and dairy shed stands across the street.

The oldest portion of the house, the ell, was built before 1786, and is generally attributed a construction date of 1772. The house was built by Jabez Partridge, an early settler of the area. Partridge was active in town affairs, signing the petition for the town's incorporation in 1785. The property remained in the hands of Patridge's descendants until 1927, and has been in the Anderson family since then. There is a building that is believed to be a period outhouse on the property. The land associated with the house has been in continuous agricultural use.

== See also ==
- National Register of Historic Places listings in northern Worcester County, Massachusetts
