= Jewett Piano Company Building =

- U.S. National Register of Historic Places
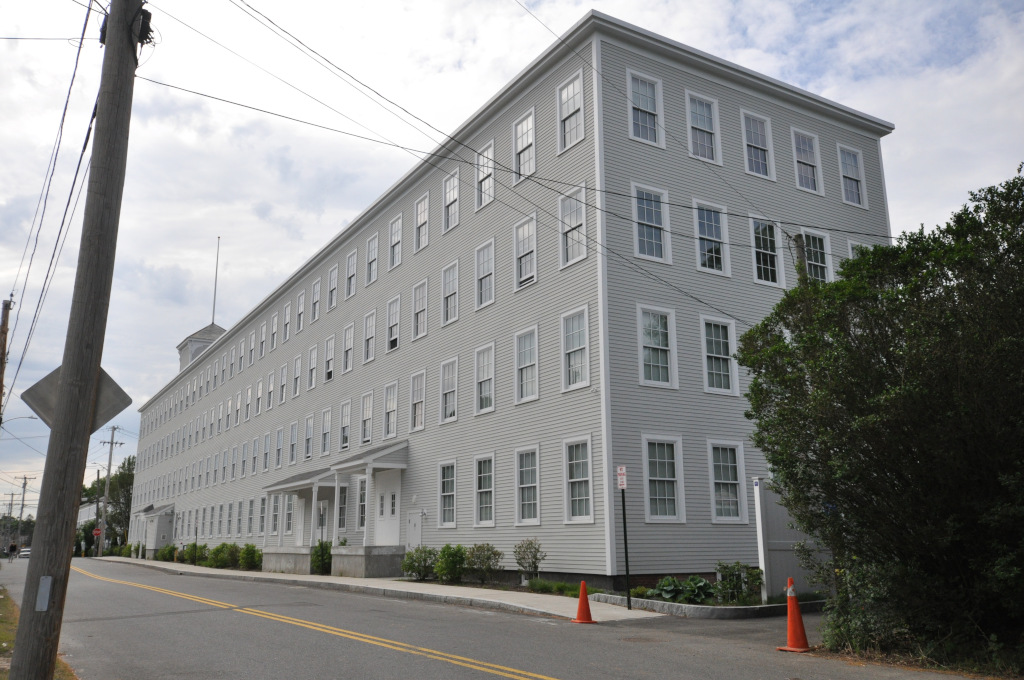

- Location within Massachusetts Location within the United States
- Location: 140 Adams St., Leominster, Massachusetts
- Coordinates: 42°31′33″N 71°45′53″W
- Built: 1892
- NRHP reference No.: 100004559
- Added to NRHP: November 1, 2019

The Jewett Piano Company Building is an historic building at 140 Adams Street in Leominster, Massachusetts. Built in 1892, it is a well-preserved example of late 19th-century wood-frame industrial construction. It is one of two surviving 19th-century piano case company plants in the city, which was known for this industry until World War I. The building was listed on the National Register of Historic Places in 2019. The building has been converted to residential use, known as Ivory Key Apartments.

== Description and history ==
The former Jewett Piano Company Building is located on the south side of Adams Street, extending west from its junction with Cotton Street. It is a four-story timber-framed structure, five bays wide and 32 long, with a flat roof topped by a cupola roughly near the middle.

The piano case manufacturing industry was one of Leominster's major businesses in the 19th century, contributing significantly to the city's economic growth until a precipitous decline in the years following World War I. Wade Hampton Jewett (1819-1894), a native of Amesbury, Massachusetts, came to Leominster and in 1840 began manufacturing furniture. He opened the first in a series of piano case manufacturing partnerships in 1856, and incorporated W.H. Jewett in 1885. That business built this plant in 1892, and operated there until closing in 1931. It was then taken over by New England Novelties, which operated here and in a nearby building on Adams Street. By 1983 the building had stood vacant for some years.

== See also ==
- National Register of Historic Places listings in northern Worcester County, Massachusetts
