= Winchendon Village Historic District =

Historic district in Massachusetts, United States

- U.S. National Register of Historic Places
- U.S. Historic district
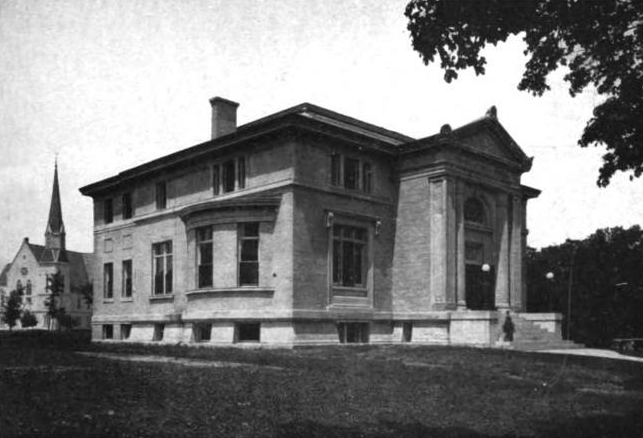
- The Beals Memorial Library, 1915

- Location within Massachusetts Location within the United States
- Location: Roughly, N side Central St. from Summer to Front Sts. and N side Front from Academy to Spring Sts., Winchendon, Massachusetts
- Coordinates: 42°40′54″N 72°3′0″W
- Area: 15.9 acres (6.4 ha)
- Architectural style: Greek Revival, Italianate, Federal
- NRHP reference No.: 92000056
- Added to NRHP: September 1, 1993

The Winchendon Village Historic District encompasses the 19th-century commercial center of Winchendon, Massachusetts. It extends along Front and School Streets from School Square to Spring Street, and continues north on Central Street as far as Summer Street. This area was developed primarily because of industrialization that took place along Miller's River beginning in the late 18th century and extending into the 1830s, and then expanded further with the arrival of the railroad in the area in the 1840s. This growth caused the area to eclipse the town's colonial town center. The area had risen to sufficient prominence by 1850 that the town hall was built there, which would be followed by other municipal buildings, including the 1913 Beals Memorial Library. The district was listed on the National Register of Historic Places in 1993.

Winchendon Village was first known as Morse's Village, and had its beginnings in the construction of a dam and grist mill on the Millers River in 1752. Isaac Morse built a hotel at the junction of Front and Central Streets about 1805, and the area benefited from improved roads in the early 19th century. A fulling mill, established in 1793 on one of the mill privileges, was expanded to produce textiles in the 1820s, and tanneries added to the economic base. The routing of a rail line in 1848 through the village (north of the district, now a rail trail) cemented the village's economic importance in the town. Central Street developed as the commercial hub, and Front Street was lined with the fine houses of local businessmen.

== See also ==
- National Register of Historic Places listings in Worcester County, Massachusetts
