= Enoch Whitmore House =

Historic house in Massachusetts, United States

- U.S. National Register of Historic Places
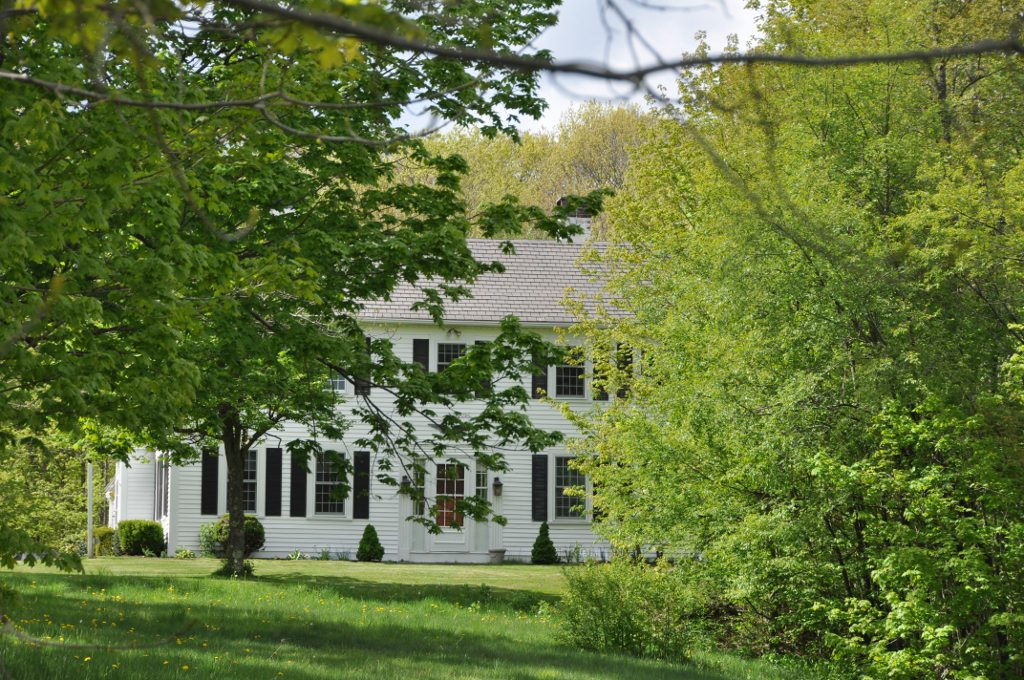
- Location: Ashburnham, Massachusetts
- Area: 19.4 acres (7.9 ha)
- Built: 1779
- Architectural style: Federal
- MPS: Underground Railroad in Massachusetts MPS
- NRHP reference No.: 07001362
- Added to NRHP: January 9, 2008

The Enoch Whitmore House is an historic house at 12 Daniels Lane in Ashburnham, Massachusetts. Built about 1779, this Federal period house is historically significant as a documented stop on the Underground Railroad, where fugitive slaves were sheltered. The house was listed on the National Register of Historic Places in 2008.

== Description and history ==
The Whitmore House is located in a remote part of rural northwestern Ashburnham, at the end of Daniels Lane, a short road off Tuckerman Road. The rambling Federal style wood-frame house is estimated to have been built in the second decade of the 19th century, probably after the 1818 marriage of Enoch Whitmore to Clarissa Willard, and the sale of the land on which it stands by Isaac Whitmore to his son. The house consists of a main block, which is a typical Federal period five bays wide and 2 1/2 stories high, and a series of additions on the back of the house. The main facade is five bays wide, with a center entrance flanked by sidelight windows and topped by a modest entablature. The relatively large size of the house is an indication of the status Whitmore had in the community, where he served in a number of civic posts.

It is due to Enoch Whitmore's activities as an abolitionist and participant in the Underground Railroad that his house is significant. In this matter Whitmore was influenced by Charles Turner Torrey, who was known to be active in the assistance of fugitive slaves. The only fugitives he is documented to have sheltered are the family of Josiah Thomas, who escaped from Maryland slaveowners and were on his farm in 1847. The Thomases eventually settled in Ashburnham. Whitmore continued to be active in abolitionist circles, joining the Free Soil Party in the 1850s.

== See also ==
- National Register of Historic Places listings in northern Worcester County, Massachusetts
