= Whitney Tavern =

Historic building in Massachusetts, US

- U.S. National Register of Historic Places
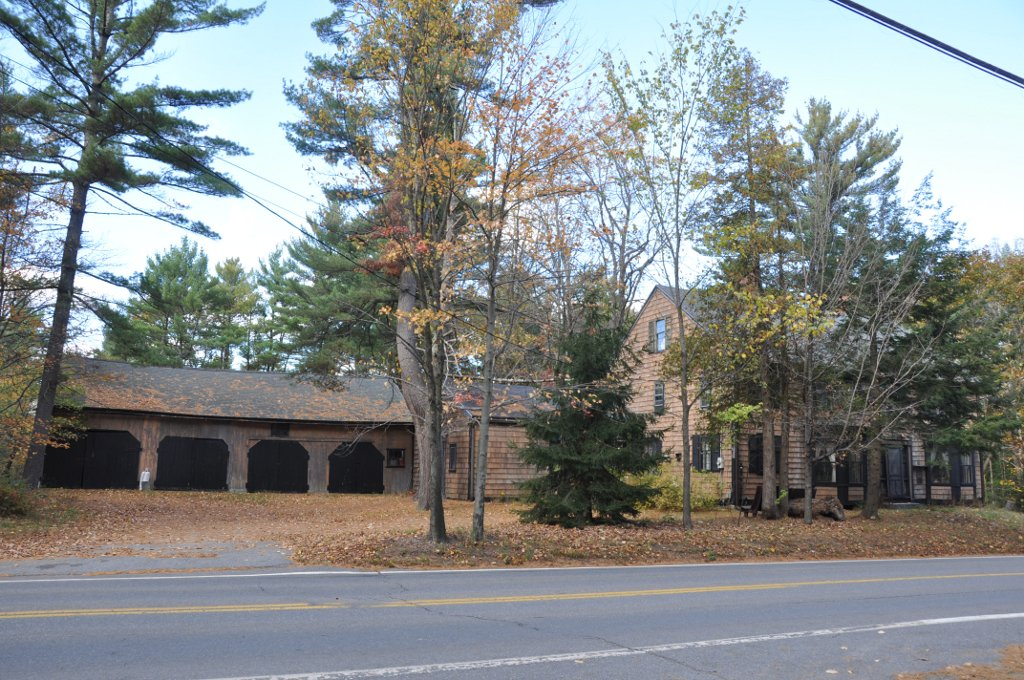

- Location within Massachusetts Location within the United States
- Location: 11 Patriots Rd., Templeton and Gardner, Massachusetts
- Coordinates: 42.56358°N 72.0269°W
- Area: 37 acres (15 ha)
- Built: 1782-1835
- Architectural style: Greek Revival, Italian Villa
- NRHP reference No.: 96000304
- Added to NRHP: June 12, 1996

Whitney Tavern is a historic 19th century tavern at 11 Patriots Road in Templeton, Massachusetts. The oldest portion of this rambling wood-frame structure (now a private residence) is a modest "A frame" structure built c. 1782 by Joshua Tucker as a tavern on the main road between Templeton and Gardner (in which town part of the property lies). The tavern was a major local landmark, sited on a turnpike, until it was sidelined by the advent of the railroads in the mid-19th century. The building, reduced in size after it closed, was listed on the National Register of Historic Places in 1996.

== Description and history ==
The former Whitney Tavern stands on the north side of Patriots Road east of the village center of East Templeton, on a large 37-acre (15 ha) parcel that extends north to Gardner Road. Now largely exhibiting Greek Revival features, the rambling structure has had a long history of alteration. After its construction c. 1782, in 1790 a full Federal-style house was added onto the west side, onto which another ell was added in 1835. In 1848 the westernmost portion of the house was separated and moved down the street.

The tavern changed hands from the Tucker family to Jonathan Greenwood Sr. William Whitney wed Greenwood's daughter, Sybil, in 1814 and they took over running the tavern. Sybil died in 1817, and the property was deeded to William Whitney, whose family continued to operate the tavern until the 1850s. Lucas Baker (b 1828) married Sibbel Georgianna "Georgie" Whitney (b 1823, William Whitney's daughter from his second marriage, to Dulcenah Turner) in 1857. In the 20th century the property was in the possession of their son, Lucas Lee Baker (b 1859), who periodically permitted traveling gypsy shows to use the property as a campground. The property remains in the hands of Whitney-Baker descendants to this day. The property includes the archaeological remnants of hop kilns used in the manufacture of beer for the tavern.

== See also ==
- National Register of Historic Places listings in Worcester County, Massachusetts
