= F.W. Smith Silver Company =

- F. W. Smith Silver Company
- U.S. National Register of Historic Places
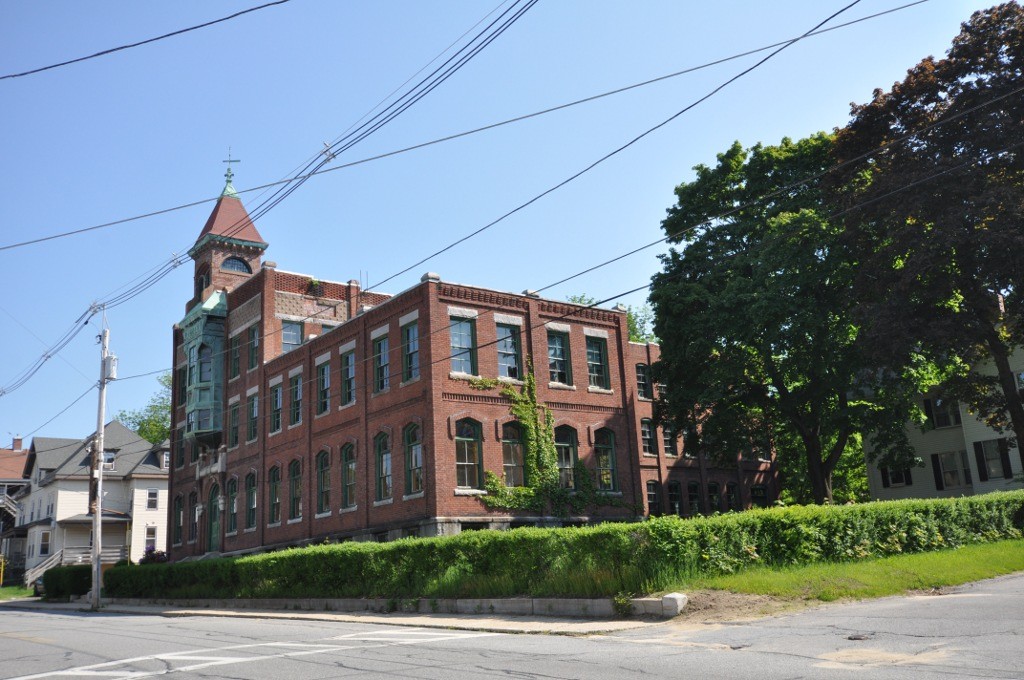

- Location within Massachusetts Location within the United States
- Location: 60 Chestnut St., Gardner, Massachusetts
- Coordinates: 42°34′43″N 71°59′14″W
- Area: less than one acre
- Built: 1892
- NRHP reference No.: 79000376
- Added to NRHP: November 14, 1979

The F.W. Smith Silver Company is a historic factory building at 60 Chestnut Street in Gardner, Massachusetts. It was built in 1892 by Frank W. Smith, who had begun manufacturing sterling silver silverware in 1886. The business continued under a succession of owners until 1958. The building is locally distinguished for its late Victorian commercial style, including a tower with pyramidal roof, and stained glass windows. The building was listed on the National Register of Historic Places in 1979.

The Smith Silver Company building is located in a mainly residential area east of downtown Gardner. It is an L-shaped three story masonry structure, built out of red brick with granite trim. The main section, three stories topped by a square tower, presents a short five-bay facade to the street, and extends toward the back of the lot. A two-story ell, six bays wide, extends to the right. The tower features rich Romanesque detailing, including round-arch windows set in recesses, and is topped by a steeply pitched slate roof capped by a finial in the shape of a knife.

Frank W. Smith was trained as a silversmith by his uncle, William Durgin, and opened his own shop in 1886, making sterling silver flatware. His business grew rapidly, and the present factory was completed in 1892. Smith hired Arthur J. Stone, a Scottish silversmith, as a lead designer and supervisor, and also began producing handcrafted products as well as machine-made ones. Stone left Smith in 1901 to establish his own shop. Silverware produced by the company was sold to Queen Elizabeth II and Princess Grace of Monaco.

== See also ==
- National Register of Historic Places listings in Worcester County, Massachusetts
