= Baldwinville Village Historic District =

Historic district in Massachusetts, United States

- U.S. National Register of Historic Places
- U.S. Historic district
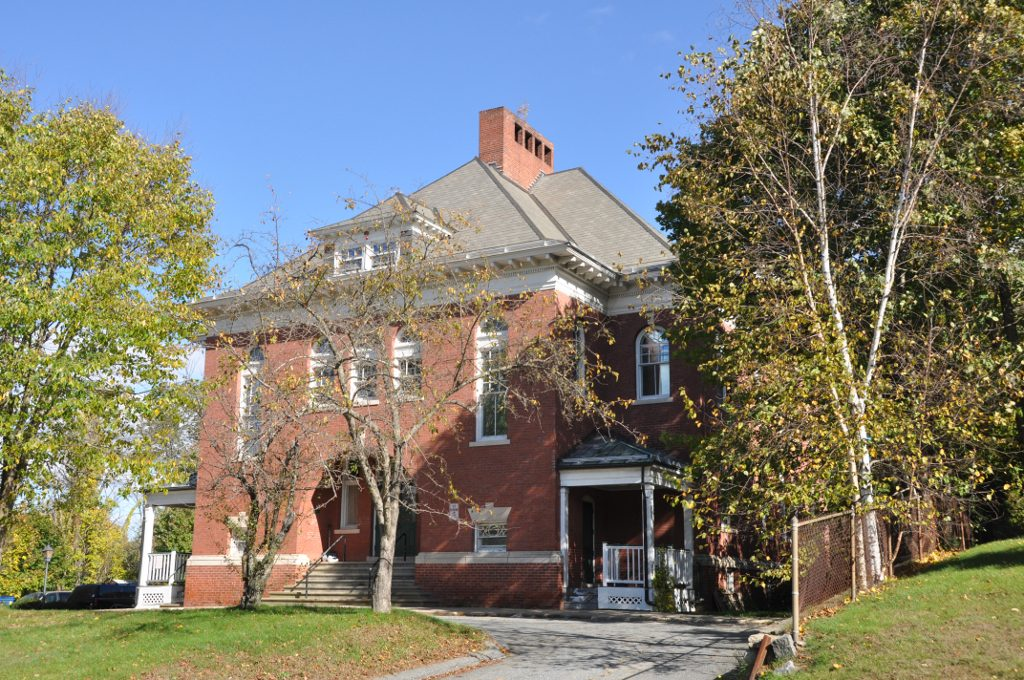
- The elementary school building

- Location within Massachusetts Location within the United States
- Location: Maple and Central Sts., Templeton, Massachusetts
- Coordinates: 42°36′18″N 72°4′38″W
- Area: 21 acres (8.5 ha)
- Built: 1754
- Architect: James E. Fuller
- Architectural style: Greek Revival, Queen Anne
- NRHP reference No.: 86000273
- Added to NRHP: February 27, 1986

The Baldwinville Village Historic District encompasses the historic elements of the village of Baldwinville, a 19th-century mill village in northern Templeton, Massachusetts. Although its industrial elements have largely been lost, the district retains period housing and civic buildings. It was listed on the National Register of Historic Places in 1986.

== Description and history ==
The town of Templeton was settled beginning in the 1750s and was incorporated in 1761. The northern part of the town remained sparsely settled, although a bridge was built across the Otter River in what is now Baldwinville in 1763, adjacent to an early saw and grist mill. The district's oldest surviving building is the 1797 residence of Eden Baldwin, owner of local lumber and brick yards, at the junction of Maple Street and Baldwinville Road on the south side of the river. In 1805 a turnpike was opened to the bridge from Royalston, which helped the area develop into a small village by 1830, when it was formally named Baldwinville. Although none of the mill buildings survive, Greek Revival houses in the district date to this phase of development. Development was further spurred by the arrival of railroads in 1847 and 1872, and it became the principal economic center of the town, focused primarily on the manufacture of chairs. During the height of the village's prosperity in the late 19th century, fine Queen Anne and Stick style houses were built. The area's industries were regularly impacted by floods and fire, and the Great New England Hurricane of 1938 destroyed or damaged most of its remaining industrial buildings.

The historic district is roughly linear in shape, extending along Elm Street north of the river and Baldwinville Road south of the river. Its northern boundary is roughly Mason Street, while its southern boundary is roughly Mountain View Street. The district bulges on the north side of the river, where the village's commercial center is located, extending west along Pleasant and Memorial Streets, and east along Circle and Central Streets.

== See also ==
- National Register of Historic Places listings in Worcester County, Massachusetts
