= Royalston Common Historic District =

Historic district in Massachusetts, United States

- U.S. National Register of Historic Places
- U.S. Historic district
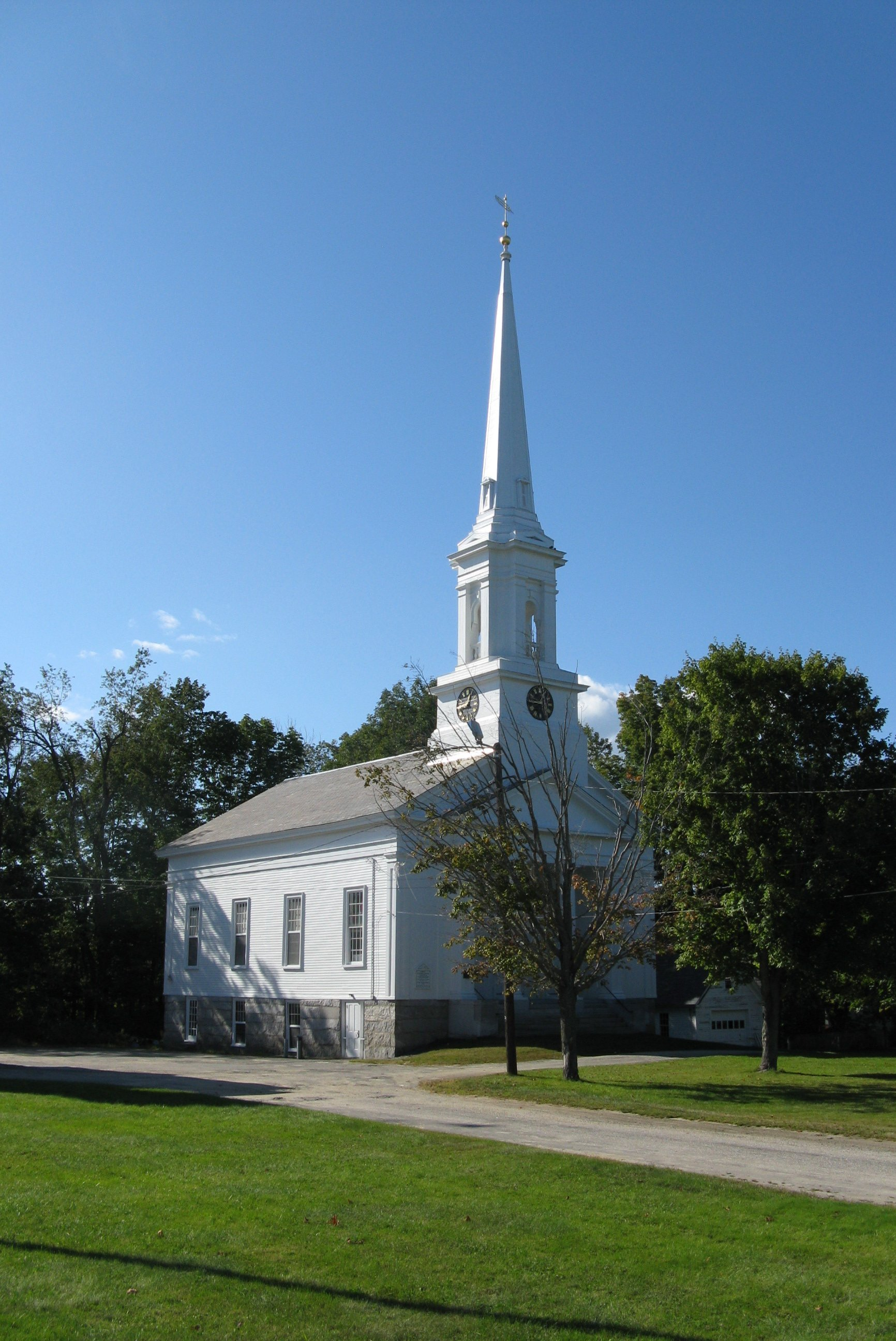
- First Congregational Church

- Location within Massachusetts Location within the United States
- Location: Royalston, Massachusetts
- Coordinates: 42°40′39″N 72°11′18″W
- Area: 30 acres (12 ha)
- Built: 1752
- Architect: Chase, Chauncey
- Architectural style: Greek Revival, Second Empire, Federal
- NRHP reference No.: 76000304
- Added to NRHP: December 12, 1976

Royalston Common Historic District is a historic district encompassing the historic village center of Royalston, Massachusetts. Centered on a long town common laid out in 1752, it is one of the best surviving examples of an 18th-century town center in the state. The district was listed on the National Register of Historic Places in 1976. The common was named as one of the 1,000 places to visit in Massachusetts by the Great Places in Massachusetts Commission.

== Description and history ==
The area that is now Royalston was purchased by a group of Boston businessmen in 1752, and its town common and cemetery were laid out at that time. Development progressed slowly in the 18th century, with a flurry of construction in 1800 resulting in the erection of several houses, shops, and a meeting house. The town was briefly of economic importance as a market center for surrounding agricultural communities, which waned by 1850. By then it had adopted its now largely residential character, with several fine houses built by the owners of mills in South Royalston adding some architectural interest.

The historic district is centered on a north-south stretch of Main Street (Massachusetts Route 68), between two separate complex junctions each involving three streets radiating out to neighboring towns. The town common, which this area is centered on, was laid out in 1752, and achieved its present shape about 1840. Flanking the common and lining the nearby roads are a collection of residences, most dating before 1850, and the town's major municipal buildings, with relatively little alteration since the 1850s. Notable late additions and alterations to the common include the 1867 Second Empire town hall, and the 1911 Colonial Revival library.

== See also ==
- National Register of Historic Places listings in Worcester County, Massachusetts
