= South Lancaster Engine House =

- U.S. National Register of Historic Places
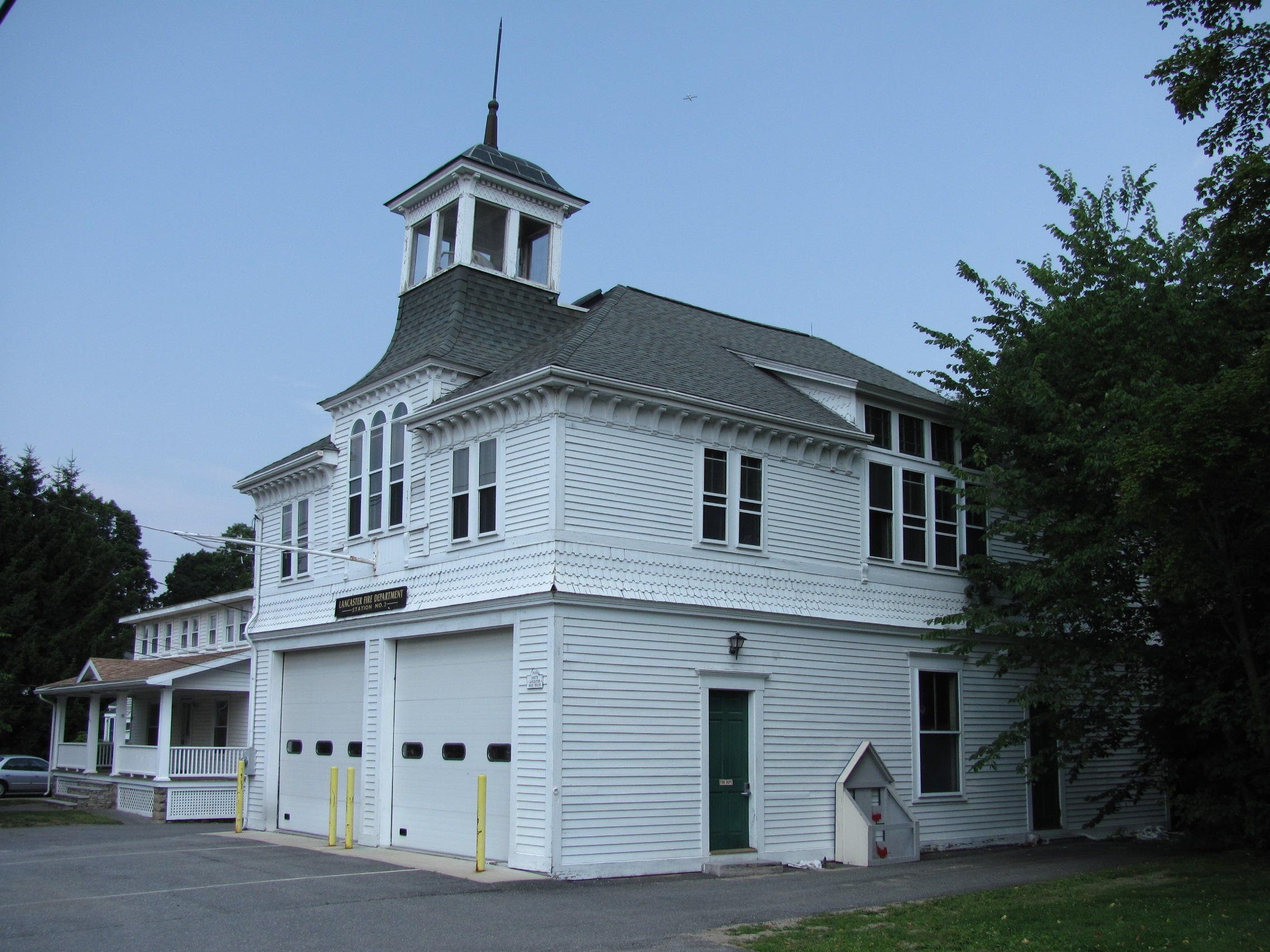
- South Lancaster Engine House

- Location within Massachusetts Location within the United States
- Location: 283 S. Main St., South Lancaster, Massachusetts
- Coordinates: 42°26′35″N 71°41′6″W
- Area: less than one acre
- Built: 1888
- Architect: C.A. Woodruff
- Architectural style: Victorian
- NRHP reference No.: 76000307
- Added to NRHP: October 22, 1976

The South Lancaster Engine House is a historic fire station at 283 South Main Street in South Lancaster, Massachusetts. Built in 1888, it is the town's oldest operating firestation, and a distinctive example of period Victorian architecture. The building was listed on the National Register of Historic Places in 1976. It presently houses engines 3 and 4 of the Lancaster Fire Department.

== Description and history ==
The South Lancaster Engine House is located in the village center of South Lancaster, on the east side of South Main Street (Massachusetts Route 70) just north of its junction with Bolton Road. It is a 2-1/2 story wood frame structure, with a hip roof and exterior finished mainly in wooden clapboards. Its front facade has two equipment bays with overhead doors (replacements for original swinging doors), and two horse stalls. The walls are flared between the first and second floors, with decorative cut shingles on the flaring. The center of the front facade has three round-headed windows, rising into a wall dormer beneath a short bell tower with an open belfry topped by a curved hip roof.

The fire station was built in 1888, and is one of the oldest fire stations in the area still in active service. Although the town had funded a municipal fire service since 1848, this was the first structure built by the town for storage of fire equipment. Early equipment housed here included an engine, wagons, and a sleigh, some of which were designed to be pulled by manpower and others by horses.

== See also ==
- National Register of Historic Places listings in Worcester County, Massachusetts
