= Duck Mill =

- U.S. National Register of Historic Places
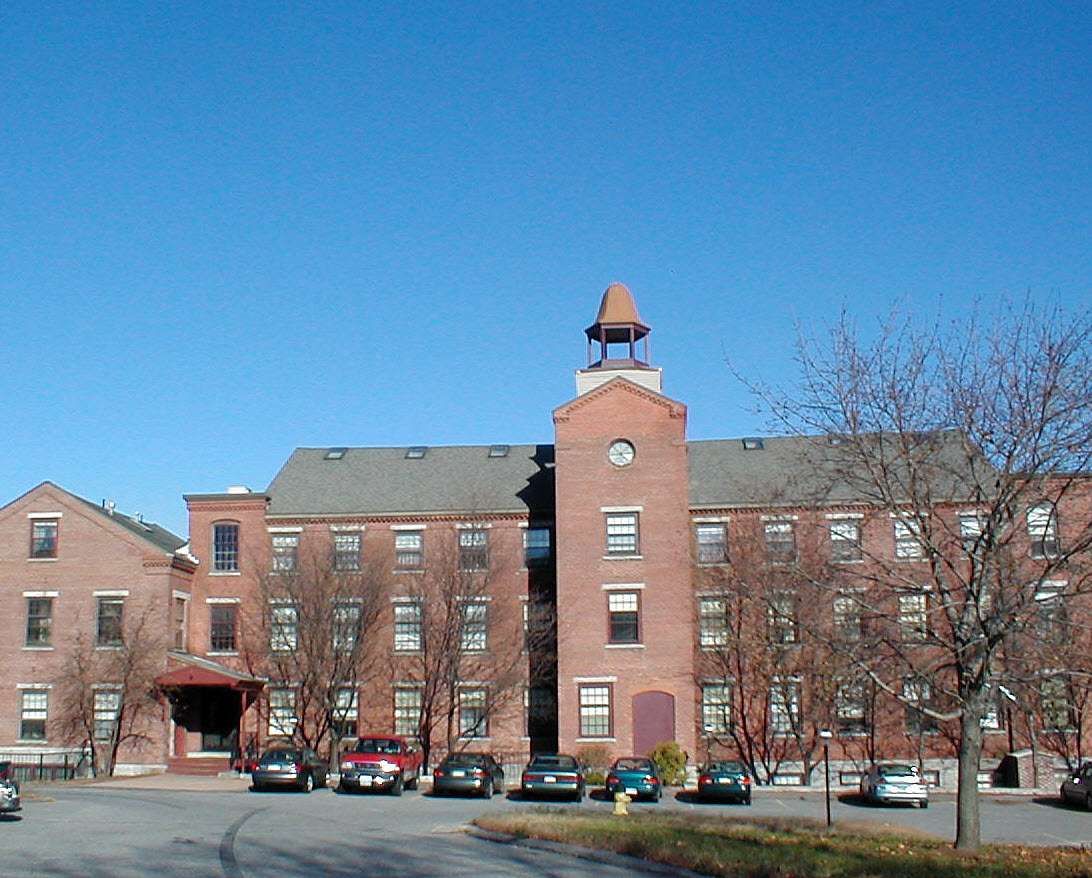

- Location within Massachusetts Location within the United States
- Location: 60 Duck Mill Rd., Fitchburg, Massachusetts
- Coordinates: 42°34′6″N 71°46′49″W
- Area: 2.5 acres (1.0 ha)
- Built: 1844
- NRHP reference No.: 85000982
- Added to NRHP: May 9, 1985

The Duck Mill is an historic mill complex at 60 Duck Mill Road in Fitchburg, Massachusetts. With a construction history dating to the 1840s, it is one of the city's oldest surviving textile mills, now readapted to residential use. The complex, long used to produce cotton duck, was listed on the National Register of Historic Places in 1985.

== Description and history ==
The former Duck Mill complex is located southwest of downtown Fitchburg, at the junction of Duck Mill Road and Bemis Street. The complex consists of a series of mostly interconnected brick buildings, ranging in height from one to 3-1/2 stories. The main building is oriented at an angle to Duck Mill Road, and has a central projecting tower with a bell-shaped cupola that was added in 1887.

This particular site, set not far from the Nashua River, has a documented history of industrial use as far back as 1832, when George Blackburn began producing cotton fabric. His first mill was destroyed by fire in 1843, and he rebuilt, opening the oldest portion of the complex the following year. The mill's success was enhanced by the arrival of the railroad nearby in 1845, and it was repeatedly enlarged. Of the city's many textile mills, it was the only one to produce heavy cotton duck fabric, which was used by the Union Army during the American Civil War. In later years of the 19th century it produced sailcloth. It was originally powered by water from the river that was delivered by a now-filled raceway, which was in the 20th century supplemented by electricity. Manufacture of textiles ceased in 1947, and the mill saw a variety of industrial tenants before its conversion to apartments.

== See also ==
- National Register of Historic Places listings in Worcester County, Massachusetts
