= First Minister's House =

Historic house in Massachusetts, United States

- U.S. National Register of Historic Places
- U.S. Historic district – Contributing property
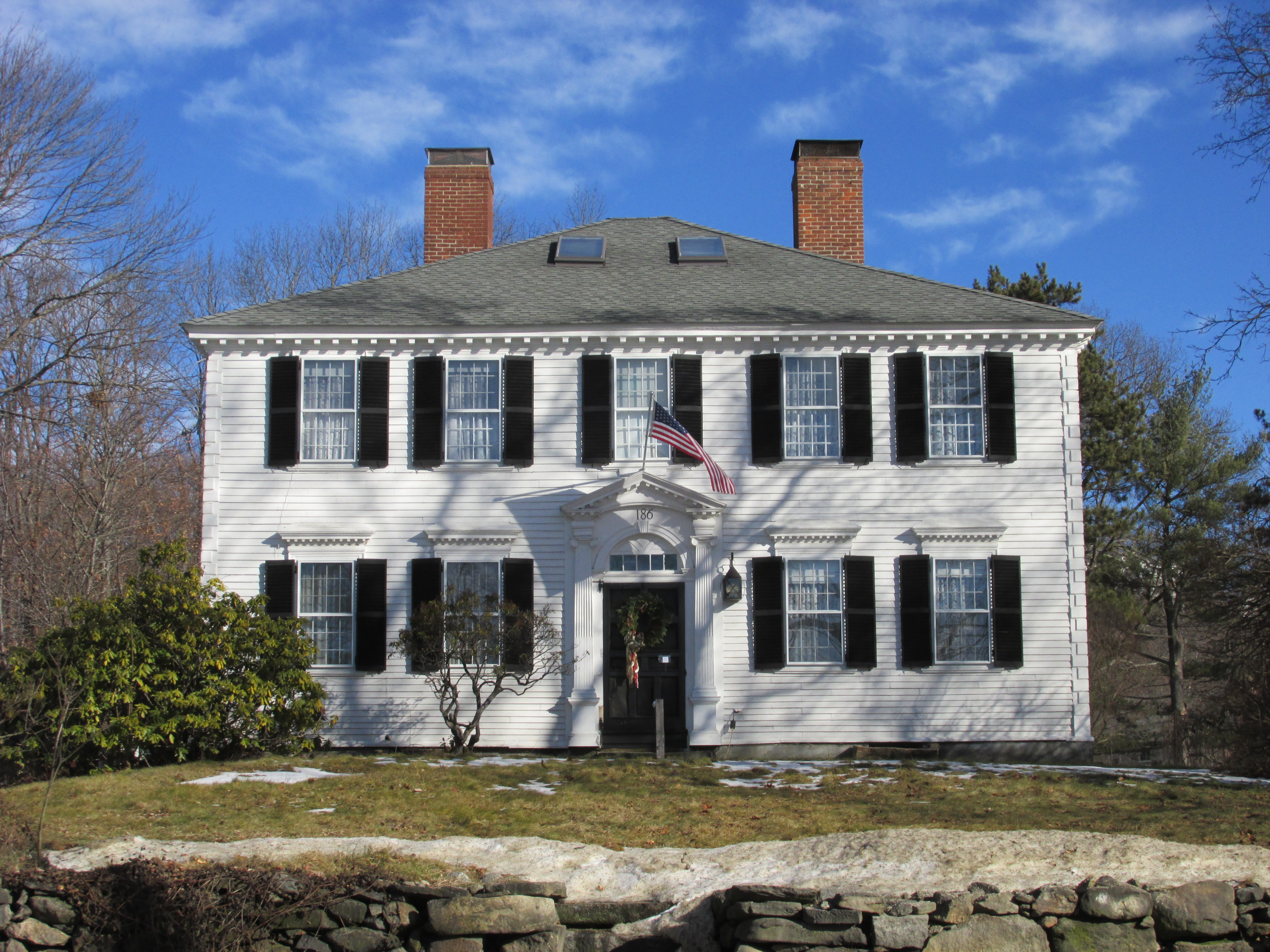
- First Minister's House

- Location within Massachusetts Location within the United States
- Location: Gardner, Massachusetts
- Coordinates: 42°34′26″N 71°59′0″W
- Area: 3 acres (1.2 ha)
- Built: 1792
- Architect: Osgood, Rev. Dr. Jonathan
- Architectural style: Georgian
- Part of: Gardner Uptown Historic District (ID99000660)
- NRHP reference No.: 79000372

Significant dates
- Added to NRHP: November 14, 1979
- Designated CP: June 3, 1999

The First Minister's House is a historic house at 186 Elm Street in Gardner, Massachusetts. The house was built in 1792 and served as the church parsonage for Rev. Jonathan Osgood, pastor of Gardner's First Congregational church and also a physician. It is one of Gardner's finest examples of late Georgian architecture. It was added to the National Register of Historic Places in 1979, and included in the Gardner Uptown Historic District in 1999.

== Description and history ==
The First Minister's House stands in a residential area east of downtown Gardner, on the east side of Elm Street at its junction with Bond Street. It is a 2 1/2-story wood-frame structure, with a hip roof, two interior chimneys, and a clapboarded exterior. The main facade is five bays wide, with windows arranged symmetrically about the center entrance. The building corners are finished in wooden trim that resembles quoining, and the main eave is lined with modillion blocks. The first floor windows are topped by a corniced entablature also adorned with blocks. The entry has a four-light rectangular transom window set under a half-round arch, and is flanked by pilasters rising to a gabled pediment. A 20th-century ell and garage extend to the rear of the building. The interior retains a number of original finishes, including wide floorboards and fireplace mantels.

The house was built in 1792 for Jonathan Osgood, the first settled minister of Gardner's First Congregational Church. Architecturally, it is a late example of Georgian design, with a number of elements in its appearance that are from the then-popular Federal style. Its second owner was Deacon Lawrence, and it was reported to be a stop on the Underground Railroad during his ownership. Suffragist and abolitionist, Lucy Stone frequently visited the house because it was home to her sister, Sarah Lawrence.

== See also ==
- National Register of Historic Places listings in Worcester County, Massachusetts
