= Wachusett Shirt Company =

- U.S. National Register of Historic Places
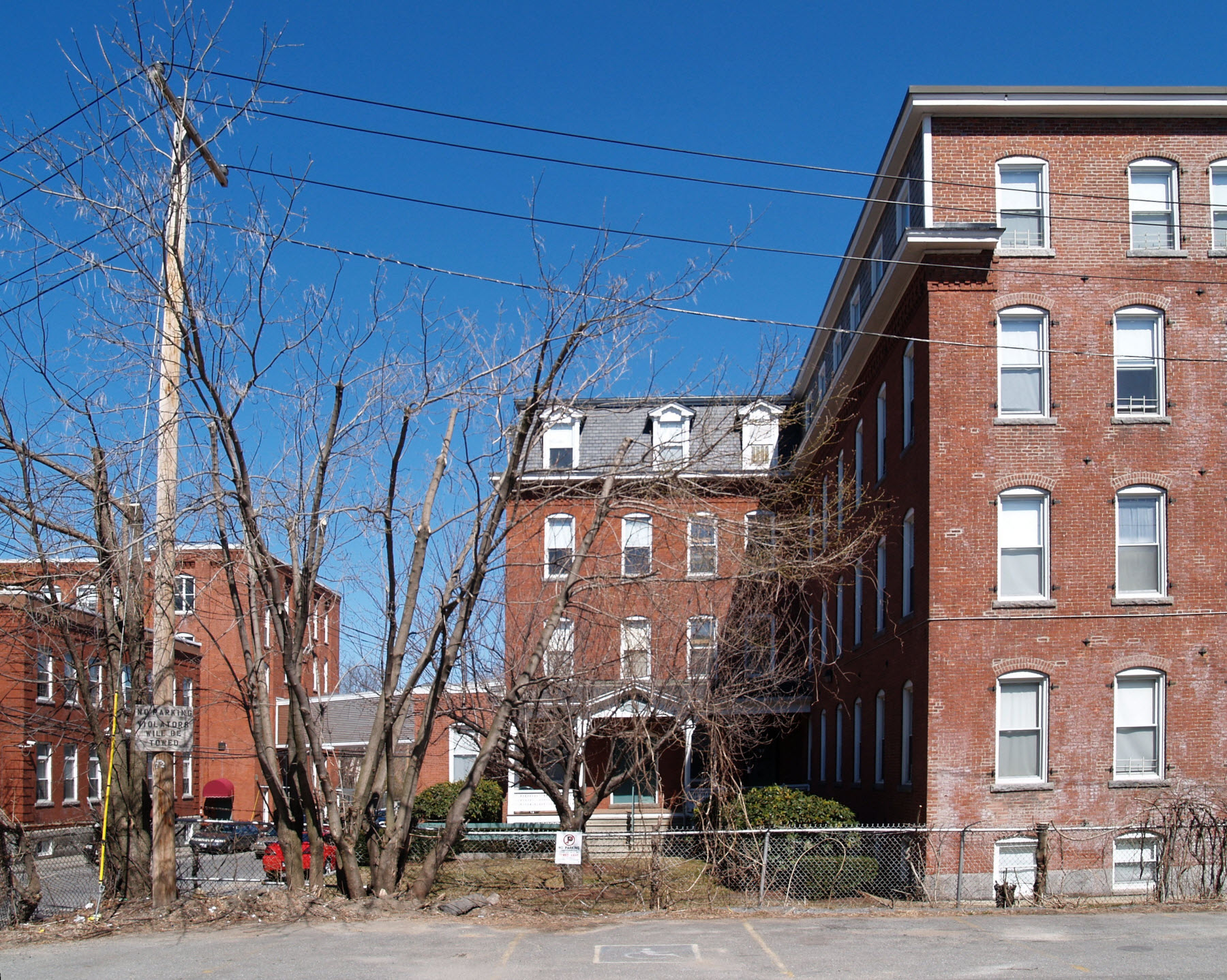

- Location within Massachusetts Location within the United States
- Location: Leominster, Massachusetts
- Coordinates: 42°31′39″N 71°45′23″W
- Area: 3 acres (1.2 ha)
- Built: 1887
- Architect: Paul Weber, F.A. Whitney
- NRHP reference No.: 82004476
- Added to NRHP: July 8, 1982

The Wachusett Shirt Company is an historic industrial complex at 97-106 Water Street in Leominster, Massachusetts, United States. The five-building complex was developed between 1887 and 1910, and was home to one of the city's leading employers until the 1930s. Most of the complex converted into a residential complex known as Riverway Apartments in 1981. It was listed on the National Register of Historic Places in 1982.

== Description and history ==
The former Wachusett Shirt Company complex is located northeast of downtown Leominster's Monument Square, flanking Water Street just southwest of Monoosnuc Brook, which was historically the source of the mill's power. The complex consists of five buildings: four buildings on the west side of Water Street, three of which are adjacent, and one building on the east side. Four are of brick construction, and range in height from two to four stories. A wood-frame bridge passes over Water Street, connecting two of the buildings. The original main mill is the east side building: it is a T-shaped four-story structure, with an elaborately decorated Renaissance Revival projecting stem. The three-building structure across the street includes a wood-frame structure, and is more simply decorated. Adjacent to it stands the two-story office building, whose most prominent feature is its main entrance, which is recessed in a large round-headed arch.

The shirt industry was a major employer in Leominster between about 1880 and 1930. Its genesis was with a company founded in 1880 by G.F. Morse, one of whose employees, George Gane, founded the Wachusett Shirt Company in 1882. He eventually took on as a partner F.A. Whitney, who had an established mill complex (northeast of this one) where carriages and chairs were made. The company worked in those premises until 1887, when the first of this complex's buildings was built. The success of the company and the concentration of experienced shirtmakers brought Cluett Peabody & Company, maker of the Arrow brand of shirts, to Leominster. The shirtmaking industry peaked in the city in 1902, with 3,000 workers, and had declined to 1,500 by 1915. Wachusett Shirt went out of business in the 1930s.

== See also ==
- National Register of Historic Places listings in northern Worcester County, Massachusetts
