= Lunenburg Historic District =

Historic district in Massachusetts, United States

- U.S. National Register of Historic Places
- U.S. Historic district
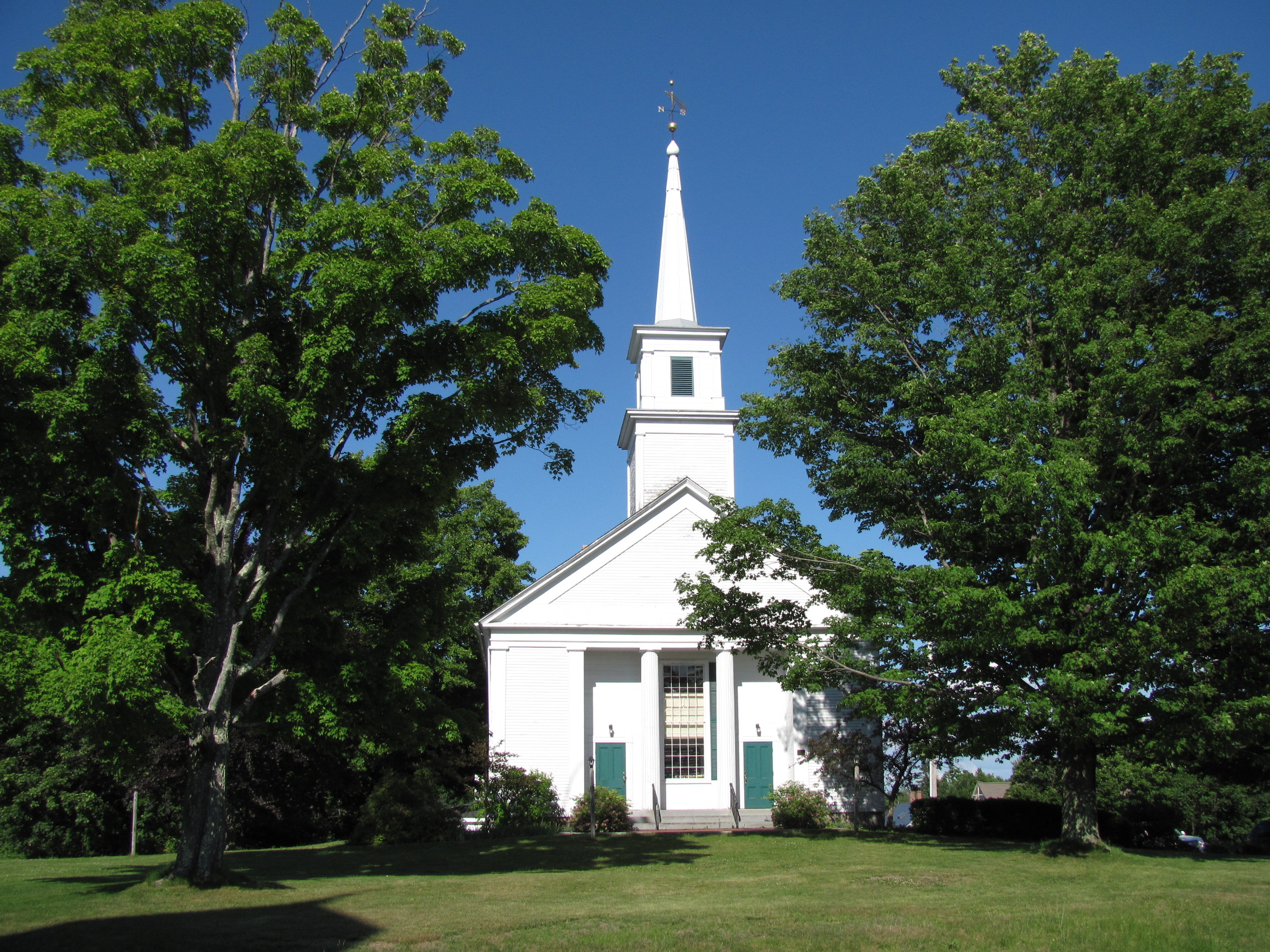
- United Parish of Lunenburg

- Location within Massachusetts Location within the United States
- Location: Lunenburg, Massachusetts
- Coordinates: 42°35′42″N 71°43′32″W
- Area: 102 acres (41 ha)
- Architect: Francis, Franklin S.; Francis, Sidney
- Architectural style: Greek Revival, Italianate, Federal
- NRHP reference No.: 87001060
- Added to NRHP: August 24, 1988

The Lunenburg Historic District is a historic district encompassing the historic center of Lunenburg, Massachusetts. The district is centered on a stretch of Main Street which connects two triangular intersections. It includes many of the town's oldest buildings, including the c. 1724 Cushing House, and the c. 1730 Stillman Stone House. Three of the town's most significant institutional buildings were built before 1850: the town hall (a former Unitarian church), the Congregational church, and the Methodist church. The district was added to the National Register of Historic Places in 1988.

== Description and history ==
Lunenburg was settled in 1718 and incorporated in 1728. For most of its history before World War I, it was a rural agrarian community, bypassed by industrialization due to a lack of good water power, and by improved transportation methods such as the railroad. The town center was laid out on a piece of high ground near its geographic center known as Turkey Hill, and is now defined mainly by the junction of Massachusetts Avenue (Massachusetts Route 2A) with Leominster Road and Lancaster Avenue. The town green, where its early colonial meeting house was the focus of civic life, is located just south of this junction, bounded by Leominster Road, Lancaster Avenue, and Whiting Avenue. Small cottage industries contributed to the town center's development most notably an early bookbinding business (producing Bibles despite the banning of their printing in British colonies) and barrel making. The town center's place as the focus of civic life was cemented in the mid-19th century by the construction of several churches, one of which (a former Greek Revival Unitarian Church) now serves as town hall.

The district is 102 acres (41 ha) in size, and includes 77 historically significant buildings. It extends for some distance along the roads radiating away from the common, as well as Massachusetts Avenue to the east and west, and Main and Highland Streets to the north. Most of the buildings in it are residential and of wood-frame construction. Historic brick buildings include an 1835 district schoolhouse. Most of the buildings are in vernacular styles popular at the time of their construction, with the Greek Revival and Federal period particularly well-represented.

== See also ==
- National Register of Historic Places listings in Worcester County, Massachusetts
