= Old Settlers' Burying Ground =

Historic cemetery in Massachusetts, United States

- U.S. National Register of Historic Places
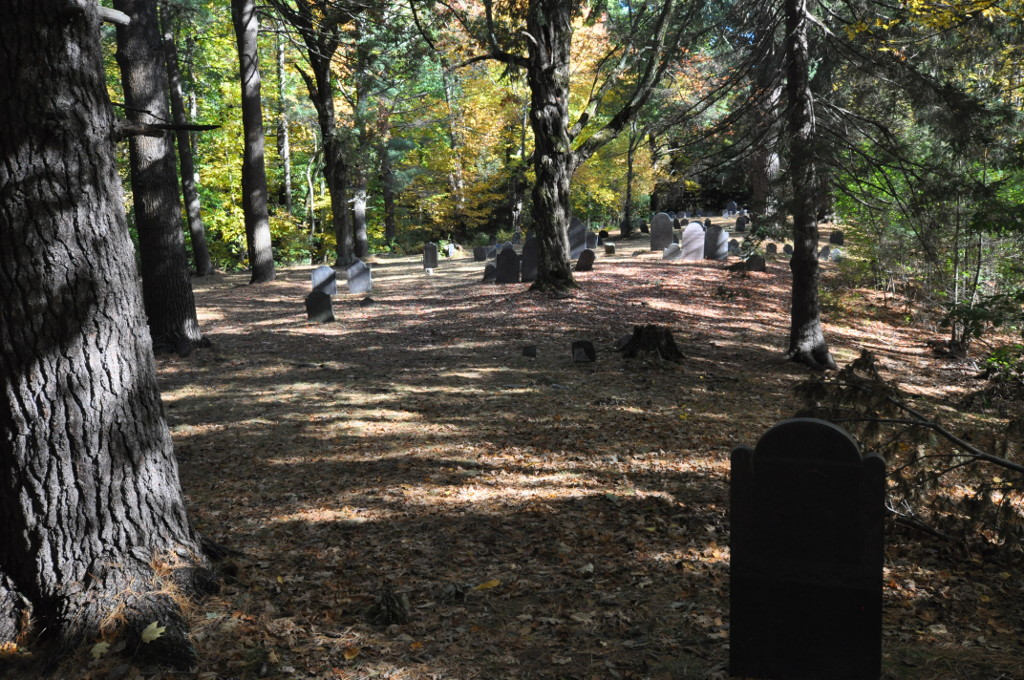

- Location within Massachusetts Location within the United States
- Location: Off Main St., Lancaster, Massachusetts
- Coordinates: 42°26′56″N 71°40′22″W
- Area: 1.5 acres (0.61 ha)
- Built: 1674
- NRHP reference No.: 100004558
- Added to NRHP: November 8, 2019

The Old Settlers' Burying Ground is an historic cemetery off Main Street in southern Lancaster, Massachusetts. Established by 1674, it is the town's oldest formal cemetery, its burials including family members of many early settlers. The cemetery was listed on the National Register of Historic Places in 2019.

== Description and history ==
Lancaster's Old Settlers' Burying Ground is located south of the town's current village center, on the east side of Main Street (Massachusetts Route 70), south of the Nashua River. It occupies about 1.5 acres (0.61 ha), located at some distance from the roadway, between local railroad tracks and the Nashua River on an elongated rise largely surrounded by wetlands. Its accessible either via the eastern end of the town's Middle Cemetery, or via an unpaved cart track roughly paralleling the river north of that cemetery. The cemetery's layout is informal, with remnants of a fence marking its perimeter. Its oldest markers exhibit crude carving, and the oldest identifiable burial is the grave of Dorothy Prescott, who died in 1674.

Lancaster was founded in 1643, and originally included land now part of several surrounding towns. Its first meeting house was built on what is now the Middle Cemetery, and land nearby was apparently set aside at an early date for a burying ground. Most early burials in the community are believed to have been informal, on family properties, and often without any formal markers. The town was devastated by a major attack in 1675, during King Philip's War. It is not known where the roughly 50 victims of the attack are buried; the town was abandoned for five years after the attack, and burials may have been either here or near where the victims were slain.

The cemetery remained in use until the late 18th century, when Middle Cemetery was opened. In 1937, the locally prominent Thayer family gave additional land to this cemetery at its eastern end, and it is there where a number of its deceased are interred. The last burial in this section was in 2006. The cemetery has since suffered from neglect.

== See also ==
- National Register of Historic Places listings in Worcester County, Massachusetts
