= North Village Historic District =

Historic district in Massachusetts, United States

- U.S. National Register of Historic Places
- U.S. Historic district
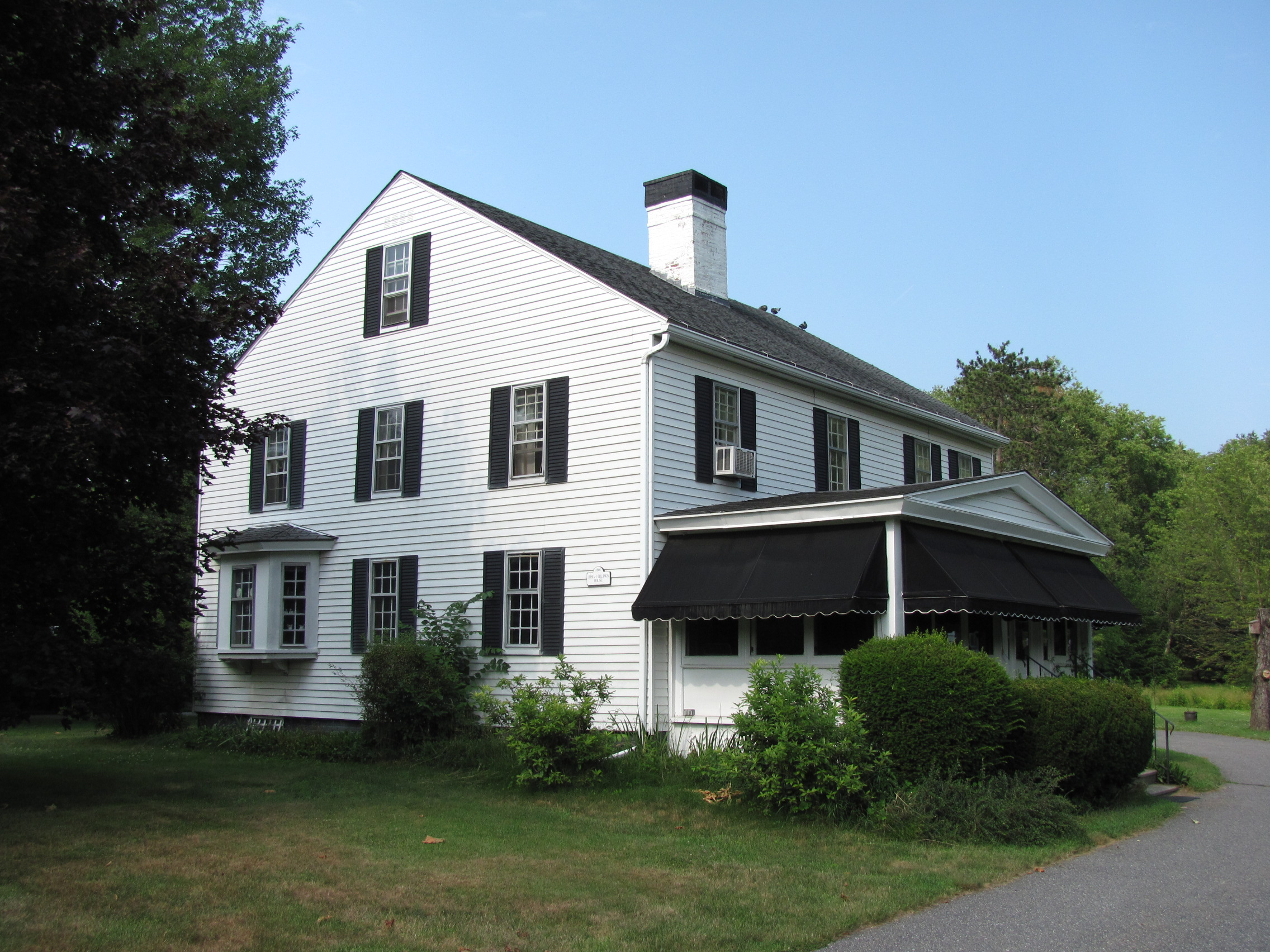
- Josiah Billings House

- Location within Massachusetts Location within the United States
- Location: Lancaster, Massachusetts
- Coordinates: 42°28′16″N 71°40′45″W
- Area: 41 acres (17 ha)
- Built: 1717
- Architectural style: Greek Revival, Federal
- NRHP reference No.: 77000199
- Added to NRHP: November 23, 1977

The North Village Historic District encompasses a well-preserved 19th-century rural village on North Main Street in Lancaster, Massachusetts. The district includes a collection of houses, most dating to the first half of the 19th century or earlier. The district was added to the National Register of Historic Places in 1977.

== Description and history ==
The town of Lancaster, one of the oldest in northern Worcester County, was founded in 1643. The area that became North Village was first settled in 1717 by John Bennett, whose house built that year still stands near the center of the district. Around 1800, it experienced a period of growth, in which more houses and several businesses, including a tannery, machine shop, and inn were established. These small industries eventually declined, leaving the village as a cluster of mainly 18th and 19th-century residences.

The historic district is anchored at the eastern end by a triangular green formed by Main Street (Massachusetts Route 117) and Otis Street, and peters out in the west near Main Street's crossing of the Nashua River. Of the 22 buildings in the district, only three were built after the 19th century. All are of wood-frame construction, and either 1-1/2 or 2-1/2 stories in height, with sash windows and clapboarded exteriors. Two houses were built in the 19th century; that of John Bennett is a large building that also served historically as a tavern. Most of the other buildings in the district were built before 1860, and are in conservative vernacular interpretations of Federal and Greek Revival styles popular at the time.

== See also ==
- National Register of Historic Places listings in Worcester County, Massachusetts
