= Levi Heywood Memorial Library Building =

- Levi Heywood Memorial Library
- U.S. National Register of Historic Places
- U.S. Historic district – Contributing property
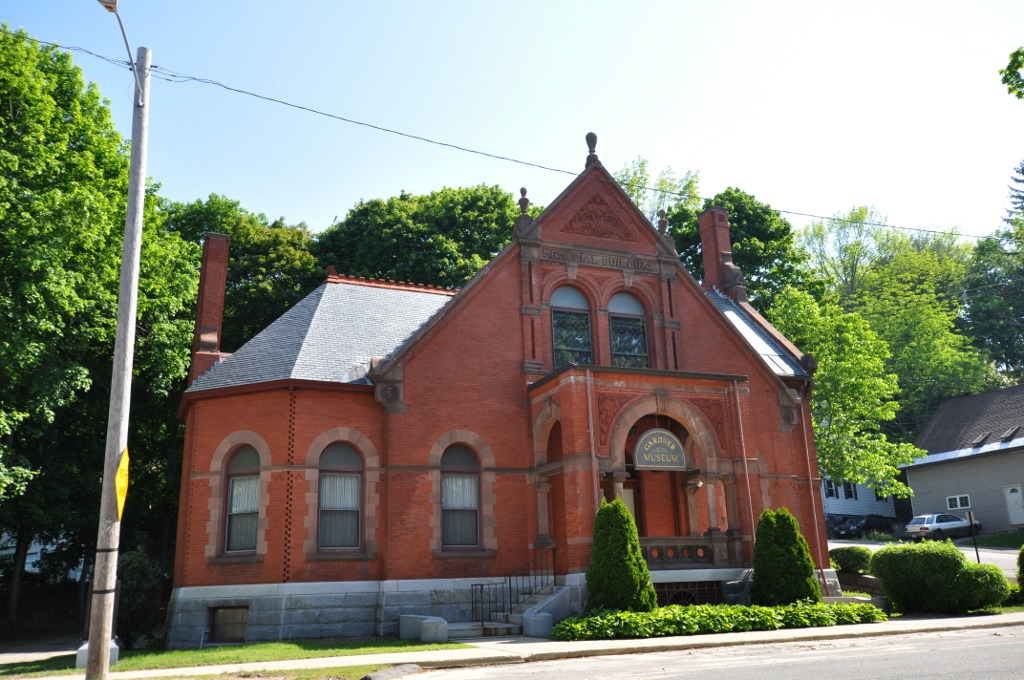
- 2013
- Location: 28 Pearl St., Gardner, Massachusetts
- Coordinates: 42°34′46″N 71°59′9″W
- Area: less than one acre
- Built: 1885
- Architect: Fuller & Delano
- Architectural style: Queen Anne; Romanesque
- Part of: Gardner Uptown Historic District (ID99000660)
- NRHP reference No.: 79000374

Significant dates
- Added to NRHP: December 6, 1979
- Designated CP: June 3, 1999

The Levi Heywood Memorial Library Building is a historic library building at 28 Pearl Street in Gardner, Massachusetts. Completed in 1886, it is one of the city's most architecturally distinguished buildings, and a good example of Richardsonian Romanesque design. It was given in honor of Levi Heywood, a prominent figure in the city's economically important chair manufacturing industry. It was used as a library until 1978, and now houses a museum dedicated to the city's history. The building was listed on the National Register of Historic Places in 1979, and included in the Gardner Uptown Historic District in 1999.

== Description and history ==
The Levi Heywood Memorial Library Building stands amid a cluster of civic and religious buildings in the historic civic center of Gardner, located east of its commercial downtown on the south side of Pearl Street. It is a 1 1/2-story masonry structure, built out of red brick with brownstone and terra cotta trim, and covered by a slate roof. Its main roof has a parapeted gable on the right end, and a polygonal bay with hip roof on the left. A large gabled pavilion projects to the front, with an arched porch sheltering the main entrance projecting further. Windows are set in round-arch openings with brownstone trim, and terra cotta panels adorn parts of the front facade.

Gardner's library was established in 1841, but had no permanent home prior to construction of this building. It was built in 1885–86 to a design by Fuller & Delano, a prominent architectural firm in Worcester. It was named for Levi Heywood, grandson of one of Gardner's founders, and an influential figure in the rise of the chair manufacturing industry that came to dominate Gardner's economy. Its operations were originally funded by an endowment given by the Heywoods, but eventually came to need municipal funding. It remained in use as the city's public library until 1978. A new facility was opened on West Lynde Street in 1998. The building now houses the local history museum.

== See also ==
- Levi Heywood Memorial Library, now located at 55 West Lynde St., Gardner, MA
- National Register of Historic Places listings in Worcester County, Massachusetts
