= Gardner Uptown Historic District =

Historic district in Massachusetts, United States

- U.S. National Register of Historic Places
- U.S. Historic district
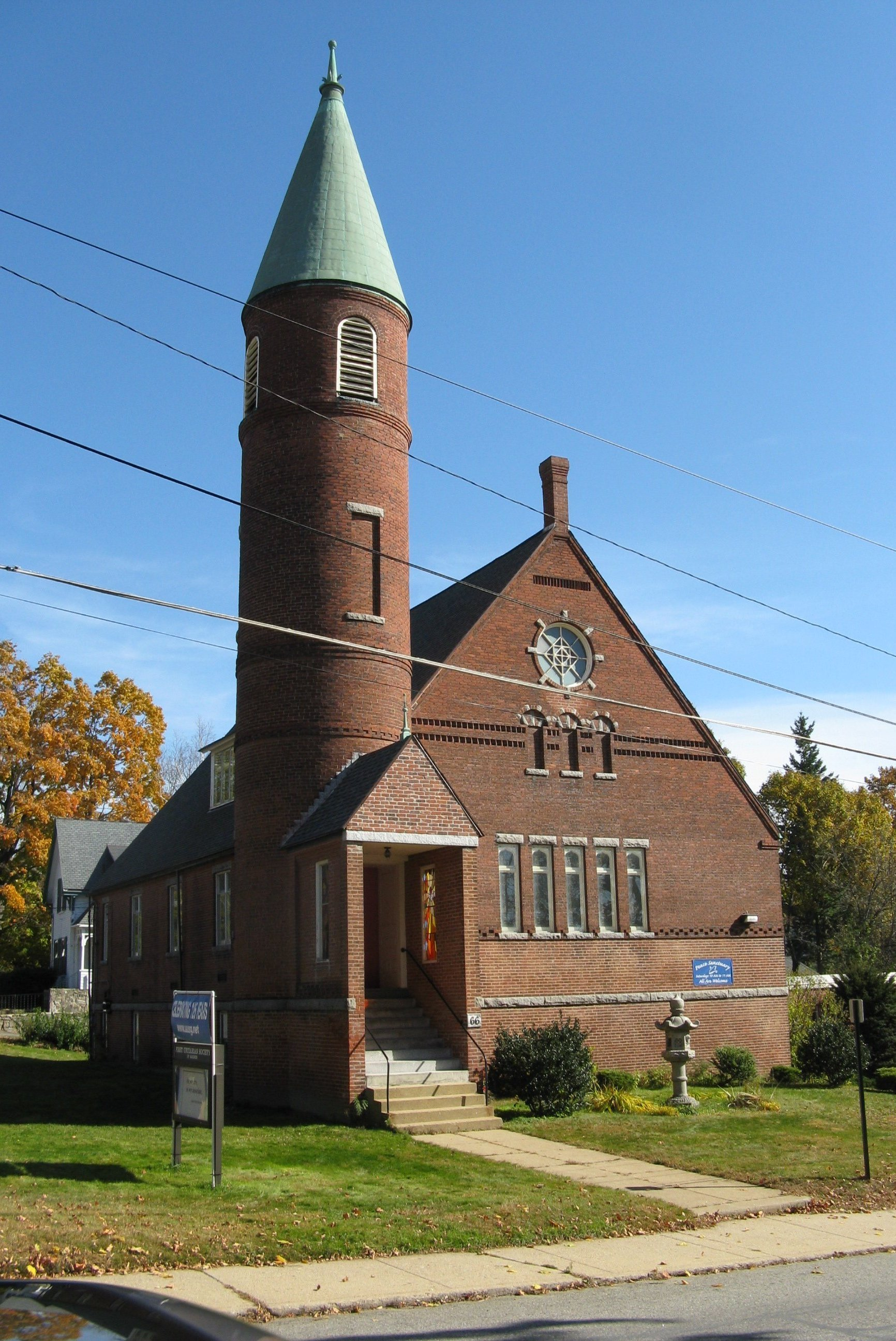
- Unitarian Universalist Society of Gardner

- Location within Massachusetts Location within the United States
- Location: Gardner, Massachusetts
- Coordinates: 42°34′40″N 71°59′4″W
- Area: 65 acres (26 ha)
- Built: 1785
- Architectural style: Federal, Mid 19th Century Revival
- NRHP reference No.: 99000660
- Added to NRHP: June 3, 1999

The Gardner Uptown Historic District is a historic district encompassing the former civic heart of Gardner, Massachusetts. The 65-acre (26 ha) area includes the old town common, an early cemetery, and a modest number of non-residential buildings among a larger number of houses. The area was the center of civic life from the incorporation of Gardner in 1785 until municipal functions were moved to West Gardner beginning in the late 1920s. The district was listed on the National Register of Historic Places in 1999.

The focal center of the district is the old town green, and the brick Victorian Gothic First Congregational Church. The green is adjacent to a major local road junction, a small rotary where Elm, Pearl, Green, and Central Streets meet. The district radiates along these streets, with additional properties on the adjacent sections of Woodland Avenue and Heywood Street, which abut on the common and the old cemetery.

Most of the buildings in the district date to the 19th century, with the majority of houses exhibiting either Greek Revival or Colonial Revival styling. Among the earliest buildings is the First Minister's House at 186 Elm Street, a Georgian/Federal house built in 1792 for Rev. Jonathan Osgood. Prominent architect-designed buildings in the district include the Levi Heywood Memorial Library Building, which was, like the First Congregational Church, designed by Fuller & Delano of Worcester, and the Syndicate Block, one of the district's few commercial buildings, which was designed by George Clemence.

== See also ==
- National Register of Historic Places listings in Worcester County, Massachusetts
- West Gardner Square Historic District
