= Old Centre Historic District =

Historic district in Massachusetts, United States

- U.S. National Register of Historic Places
- U.S. Historic district
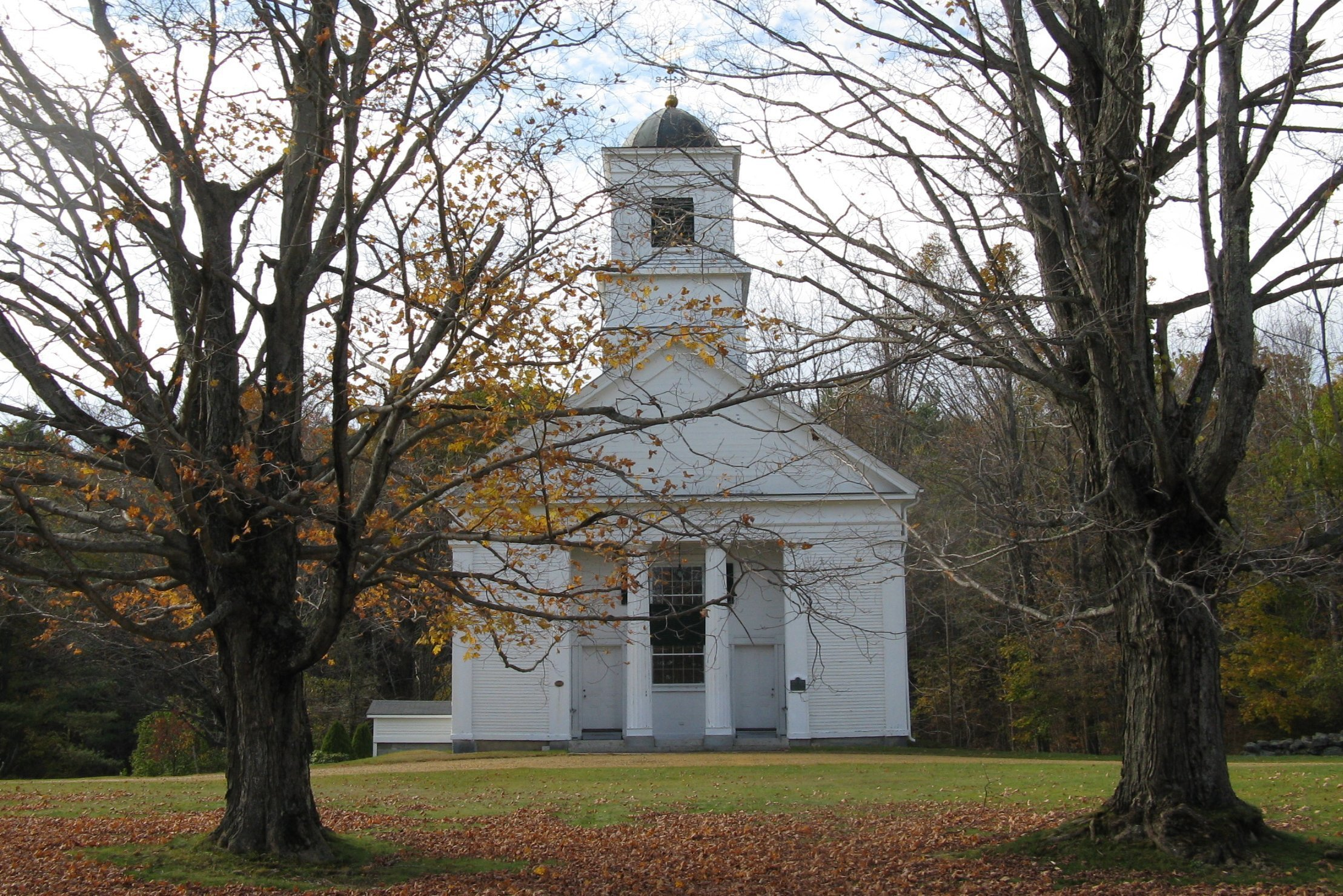
- First Congregational Church 1850

- Location within Massachusetts Location within the United States
- Location: Baldwinville and Teel Rds., Winchendon, Massachusetts
- Coordinates: 42°39′43″N 72°2′21″W
- Area: 44 acres (18 ha)
- Architectural style: Greek Revival, Georgian, Federal
- NRHP reference No.: 87000901
- Added to NRHP: September 18, 1987

The Old Centre Historic District (colloquially Old Center) is a historic district encompassing the historic town center of Winchendon, Massachusetts. It includes the town's first cemetery, the First Congregational Church, and the oldest surviving house (c. 1752) in town, and only one building constructed after 1850. The district was added to the National Register of Historic Places in 1987.

== Description and history ==
Land making up the town of Winchendon was granted to Massachusetts veterans of the 1690 Battle of Quebec from Ipswich, and was originally called Ipswich Canada. Early settlement did not take place until 1752, the same year the town common was laid out on the highest point in the town. Richard Day's house, most likely built in 1752, still faces the common, and was considered the finest in the town at the time of its construction. Connected to other communities by a network of roads, the village did not grow significantly until after the French and Indian War, and the town was not incorporated until 1764. The village thrived in its early years, providing services to local farmers and to passing stagecoaches, but declined in the later 19th century, when economic activity and major transportation routes became focused in other areas of the town.

The historic district is centered on a triangular common that remains from the original 1752 designation. It is located at the junction of five roads: High Street, Hale Street, Baldwinville Road, Teel Road, and Old County Road. It extends for short distances west on Hale Road and south on Old County Road, and a longer distance east on Teel Road to include the cemetery. The district's most prominent building is the 1850 First Congregational Church, but the common is faced by a number of fine Georgian and Federal houses.

== See also ==
- National Register of Historic Places listings in Worcester County, Massachusetts
