= Middle Cemetery =

Historic cemetery in Worcester County, Massachusetts, US

- U.S. National Register of Historic Places
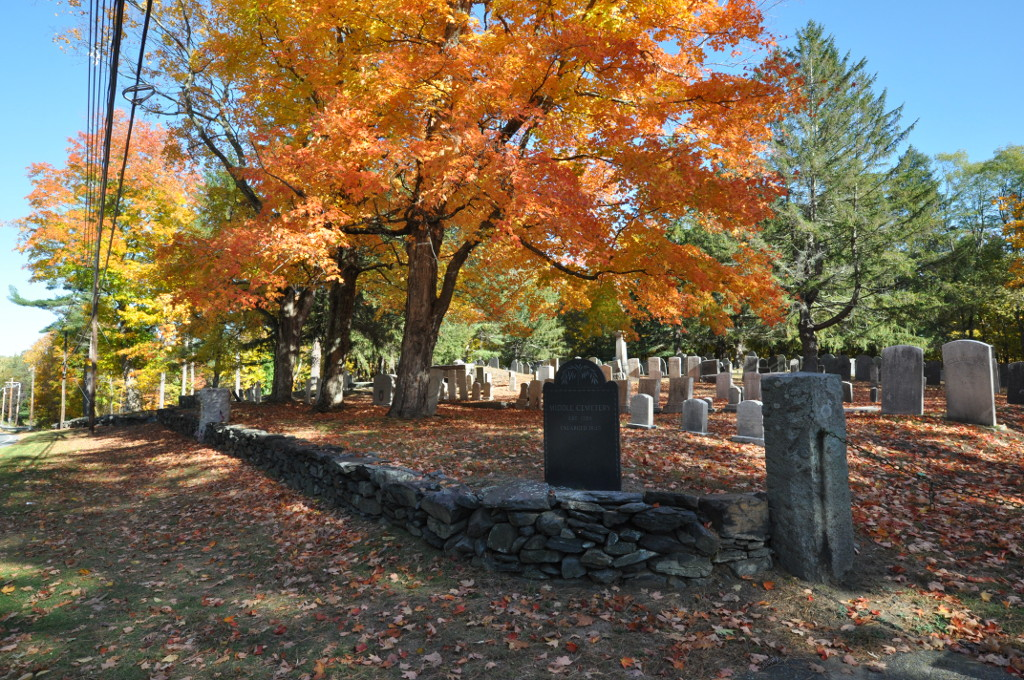

- Location within Massachusetts Location within the United States
- Location: Main St., Lancaster, Massachusetts
- Coordinates: 42°26′59″N 71°40′30″W
- Area: 1.5 acres (0.61 ha)
- Built: 1798
- NRHP reference No.: 100004560
- Added to NRHP: November 8, 2019

The Middle Cemetery is an historic cemetery on Main Street in southern Lancaster, Massachusetts. Established in 1798, it is the town's third oldest cemetery, with active burials taking place until 1969. The cemetery was listed on the National Register of Historic Places in 2019.

== Description and history ==
Lancaster's Middle Cemetery is located south of the town's current village center, on the east side of Main Street (Massachusetts Route 70), south of the Nashua River. It occupies a roughly rectangular lot about 1.5 acres (0.61 ha) in size, fronted by a low stone retaining wall and fringed by woodlands, fields, and a railroad right-of-way to its east. Two entrances in the wall provide access, marked by granite posts, and vehicular circulation within the cemetery is provided by unpaved tracks. Burials in the cemetery include descendants of many of the town's early settlers (who are themselves mostly interred in the nearby Old Settlers' Burying Ground), and the site of Lancaster's first and second meeting houses is marked near its northeast corner.

Lancaster was founded in 1643, and originally included land now part of several surrounding towns. Its first meeting house was built on this parcel in 1657; it was burned (along with all the other buildings in the town) in a 1675 Native American attack in King Philip's War. The second meeting house, built on the same site, was also burned by Natives, in 1704. The town center was then moved north to its present location. This site remained otherwise vacant until 1798, when the town acquired one acre for use as a cemetery, its first two cemeteries nearing capacity. Another half acre was acquired in 1842. The last known burial took place here in 1969.

== See also ==
- National Register of Historic Places listings in Worcester County, Massachusetts
