= Pine Grove Cemetery (Leominster, Massachusetts) =

Historic site in Worcester County, Massachusetts, US

- U.S. National Register of Historic Places
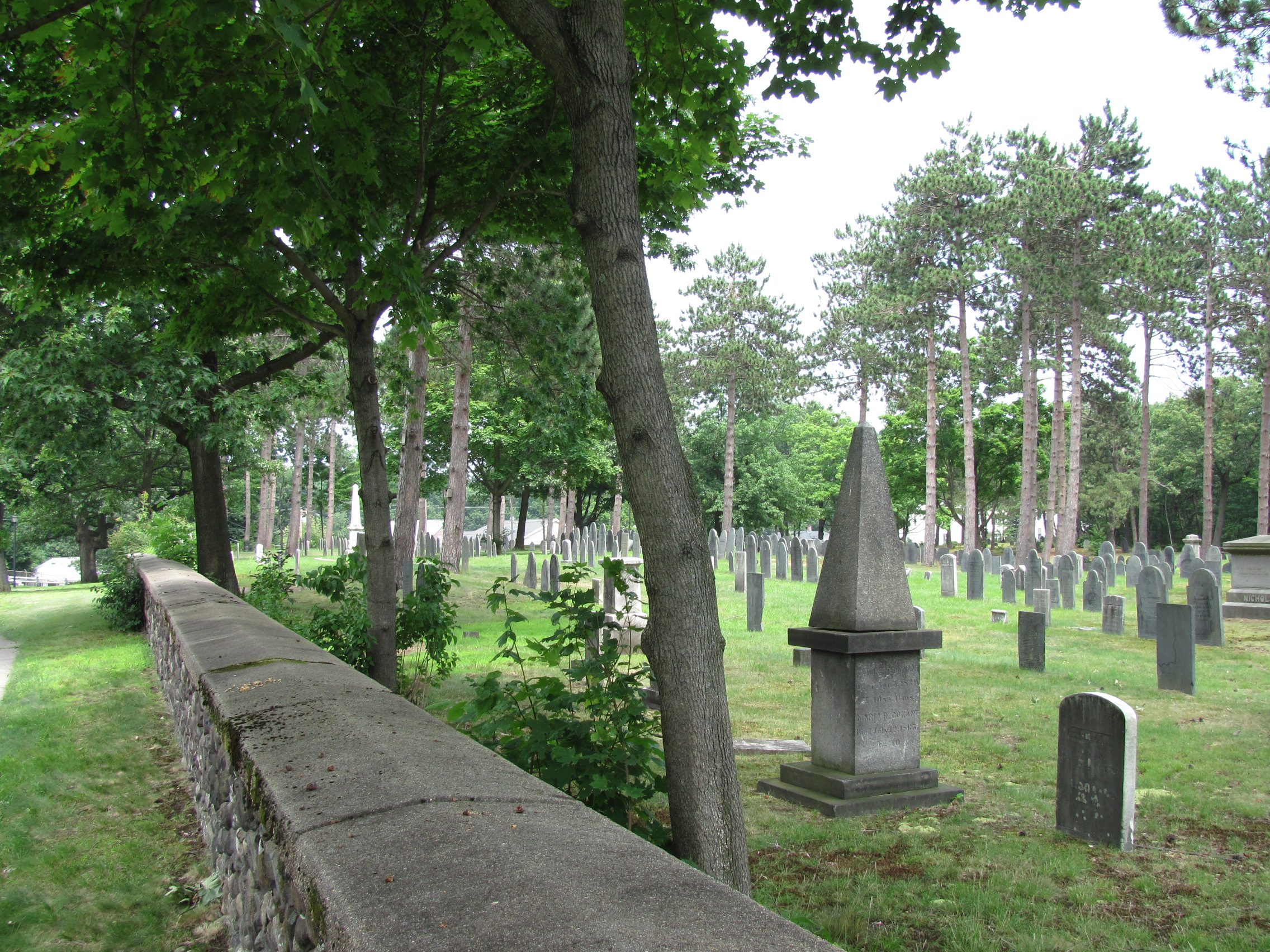
- Pine Grove Cemetery

- Location within Massachusetts Location within the United States
- Location: Tremaine and Main Sts., Leominster, Massachusetts
- Coordinates: 42°31′52″N 71°45′19″W
- Area: 3 acres (1.2 ha)
- Built: 1742
- NRHP reference No.: 08000168
- Added to NRHP: March 12, 2008

The Pine Grove Cemetery, also known as the First Meetinghouse Burying Ground, is an historic cemetery on Tremaine and Main Streets in Leominster, Massachusetts. Established in 1742, it is the city's oldest cemetery, and the principal surviving element of the town's early settlement. It was originally located adjacent to the community's first meeting house, built in 1741 and dismantled in 1774. The cemetery, closed to burials since 1937, was listed on the National Register of Historic Places on March 12, 2008.

== Description and history ==
Leominster was settled in the early 18th century as part of Lancaster, and was separately incorporated in 1740. Its first colonial meeting house was built in 1741, and the cemetery was laid out the following year. The meeting house was torn down in 1774, after a new one was built near the modern city center. The cemetery was enlarged in 1776, and again in the 1820s to reach its present size of three acres (1.2 ha). It was the city's only cemetery until 1840, when Evergreen Cemetery was opened to its northeast. It is the resting place for most of Leominster's early settlers, and for many of its 18th and 19th century political and business leaders.

The cemetery is located about 0.5 miles (0.80 km) northeast of downtown Leominster, east of Main Street and south of Tremaine Street. It is roughly rectangular in shape, and is generally level, with a steep rise only near its northern entrance. There are entrances (none accessible to public vehicles) on the north, south, and west sides. The western (Main Street) entrance is for pedestrians only, while the other two have normally locked wrought iron gates. Vehicular circulation is by two grassy (formerly cobbled) roads that run roughly north–south, one of them connecting the north and south gates. Burials in the cemetery, in addition to early settlers and business leaders, include a number of American Revolutionary War veterans.

== See also ==
- National Register of Historic Places listings in Worcester County, Massachusetts
