= F. A. Whitney Carriage Company Complex Historic District =

Historic district in Massachusetts, United States

- U.S. National Register of Historic Places
- U.S. Historic district
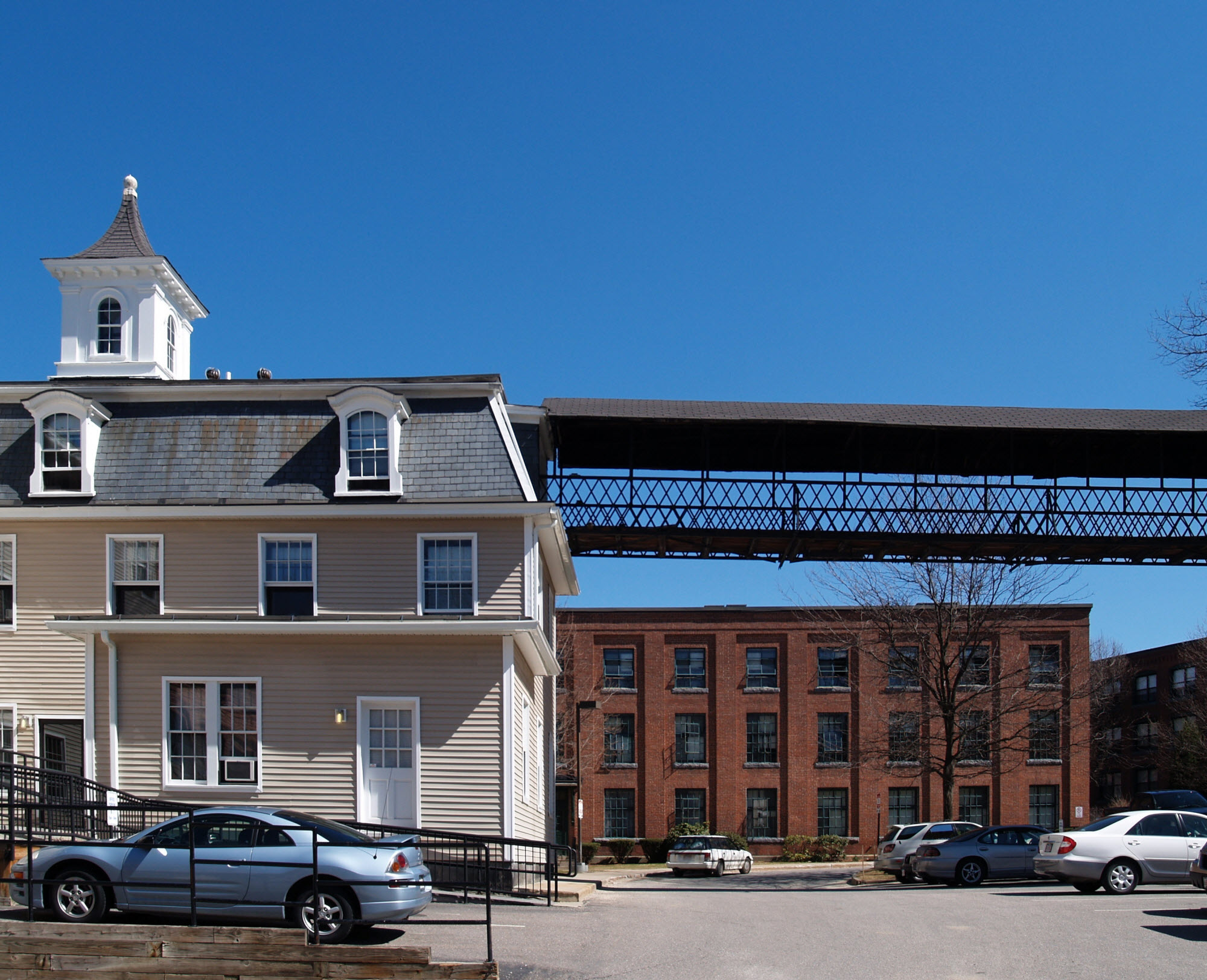

- Location within Massachusetts Location within the United States
- Location: Off 124 Water St., Leominster, Massachusetts
- Coordinates: 42°31′45″N 71°45′18″W
- Area: 12 acres (4.9 ha)
- Built: 1872
- Architectural style: Second Empire, Romanesque
- NRHP reference No.: 88000716
- Added to NRHP: June 23, 1988

The F. A. Whitney Carriage Company Complex Historic District encompasses a major 19th-century industrial complex off 124 Water Street in Leominster, Massachusetts. The complex is one of the best-preserved in the city, and was developed by one of its most successful businesses of the late 19th and early 20th centuries. The F. A. Whitney Company, founded in 1858, manufactured baby carriages and related products, and operated here from 1862 to 1952, and was one of the city's major employers. The oldest surviving buildings of its manufacturing complex date to 1872. The district was listed on the National Register of Historic Places in 1988. Most of the complex has been converted into residential use.

== Description and history ==
The Whitney Carriage Company was founded in 1858 by cousins Francis A. and Francis W. Whitney, who set out to manufacture an affordable line of baby carriages. Originally located in a piano factory basement on Mechanic Street, that plant was destroyed by fire in 1862. The present factory site on Monoosnock Creek was purchased and first developed in 1868. At its height in the early 1920s, the company produced 200,000 carriages per year, and employed between three and four hundred workers. The company's fortunes waned during the Great Depression, and it closed its doors in 1952. Francis A. Whitney, in addition to founding this company, opened a business manufacturing shirts, chairs, and thread in Leominster.

The historic district occupies 12 acres of land in a bend in Monoosnock Brook, about 0.25 miles (0.40 km) east of downtown Leominster, bounded on the south by Water Street and the east by Whitney Street. The complex has more than twenty buildings, many of them interconnected. Most of them are brick, but there are several older wood frame buildings, including its oldest, the 1872 Second Empire office building. Most of the buildings were erected before 1920, and are stylistically similar to textile mills of the period. However, they are laid out organizationally to facilitate the various stages and processes associated with carriage manufacturing.

== See also ==
- National Register of Historic Places listings in Worcester County, Massachusetts
