= Joseph Palmer (communard) =

American bearded man, Transcendentalist

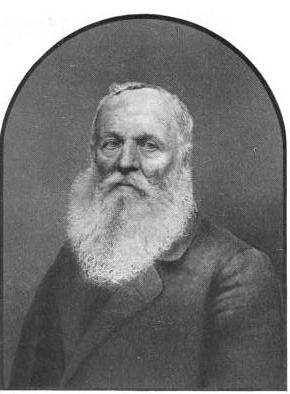
- Joseph Palmer, published in 1915
- Born: Joseph Michael Palmer; 1789; Notown, Massachusetts, U.S.
- Died: October 30, 1873 (aged 83–84)
- Resting place: Evergreen Cemetery; North Leominster, Massachusetts, U.S.
- Organization: Fruitlands
- Known for: Being persecuted for wearing a beard
- Movement: Abolitionism in the United States, Transcendentalism
- Military career
- Branch: United States Army
- Conflicts: War of 1812

Joseph Michael Palmer (1789 – October 30, 1873) was an American bearded man, who faced persecution for wearing a beard. A prominent Transcendentalist and abolitionist, Palmer was a member of the Fruitlands commune and an associate of Louisa May Alcott.

== Life ==
A farmer from Notown, a village on the outskirts of Leominster, Massachusetts, Palmer was a veteran of the War of 1812. In 1830, Palmer was a successful Yankee farmer, but was by no means a typical one. Possibly influenced in childhood by a bearded itinerant evangelist named Lorenzo Dow, Palmer took to wearing a long beard in the 1820s. Few men in the United States wore beards after about 1820, and Palmer was considered eccentric and slovenly. Nicknamed "the old Jew", he was regularly harassed and questioned about his insistence on wearing a beard. A prominent Fitchburg minister once accosted him: "Palmer, why don't you shave and not go around looking like the devil?" Palmer replied: "Mr. Trask, are you not mistaken in your comparison of personages? I have never seen a picture of the ruler of the sulfurous regions with much of a beard, but if I remember correctly, Jesus wore a beard not unlike mine."

One day early in May 1830, four men armed with scissors and razors attacked Palmer outside a Fitchburg hotel and attempted to shave him. Palmer successfully fended off his attackers. He was even able to use his jackknife to wound the legs of two of his assailants. Charged with "unprovoked assault", Palmer was arraigned a few days later before Judge David Brigham and fined. Palmer refused to pay the $10 fine, nearly $40 in court fees, and a $700 bond that resulted from his conviction for the crime of defending himself. Palmer was thrown into the Worcester County Jail and kept there for more than a year for refusing to pay the fine.

Palmer kept a detailed journal of his fifteen months in the jail; the original is preserved in the archive at Fruitlands Museum. His prison diary records the words and actions of his often sadistic jailers, the experiences of his fellow prisoners, and his own steadfastness in resisting the efforts of the state and society to break him of his unconventional habits and opinions. Palmer's term in jail was extremely unpleasant at times. He was dangerously sick during his first few weeks behind bars. Later, he was beaten several times by the jailers, nearly starved for days at a time, placed in solitary confinement for several months, and physically threatened by other prisoners who tried to cut off his beard. But Palmer made life nearly as difficult for the officials who were keeping him in the jail as they made it for him. To Calvin Willard, Sheriff of Worcester County, he sent a constant stream of letters, complaining of the poor conditions in the jail. One time, to prove to the sheriff how little food he was receiving, he sent Willard a package containing every morsel of food the jailers had given him in one day. For such acts, his jail keepers, especially Hosea Bellows and Dorance Wilder, treated Palmer even worse. On September 22, 1830, after a little more than four months in prison, Palmer exploded in distress and fury at the treatment he and his fellow prisoners were receiving. He was punished for his outburst by spending the next three months in solitary confinement.

Throughout his imprisonment, Palmer insisted that he was innocent and that to pay a fine, even only $10, would equate to admitting his own guilt. Palmer's case became something of an embarrassment to county authorities, who realized that his jail term was far exceeding his "crime", and they sent several committees to the jail to convince him to leave. They offered to waive the $700 bond, if he would only pay the fine and court fees. Palmer told one of the committees, "If I aint [sic] a safe person to have my liberty I ought not to go out. And I am willing to stay in confinement til [sic] I am." It was not until David Brigham, the judge who had originally fined Palmer, visited the Worcester prison and begged Palmer to relent. Brigham also carried a letter from Palmer's mother, a woman well into her eighties, pleading with him to come home. On August 31, 1831, after more than fifteen months in prison, Palmer paid his fine and left the jail. Palmer publicized his case by writing letters from jail that were widely published after first appearing in the Worcester Spy. When he later visited Boston in 1840, crowds on the street mocked him.

Imprisonment reinforced Palmer's interest in political and religious reform. He was involved in prison reform and was an early abolitionist. In the early-1840s he attended the Chardon Street Convention in Boston, where he met prominent figures including Ralph Waldo Emerson, Amos Bronson Alcott, and William Lloyd Garrison. His acquaintance with Alcott led to his decision to join the Fruitlands experiment in 1843. Palmer joined the short-lived Fruitlands commune in Harvard, Massachusetts, where he proved one of the more practical farmers. He bought the group's property when it dissolved as a social experiment. Emerson and Henry David Thoreau visited him there. Palmer briefly tried to establish a second communal enterprise, founding the Leominster and Harvard Benevolent Association with Charles Lane.

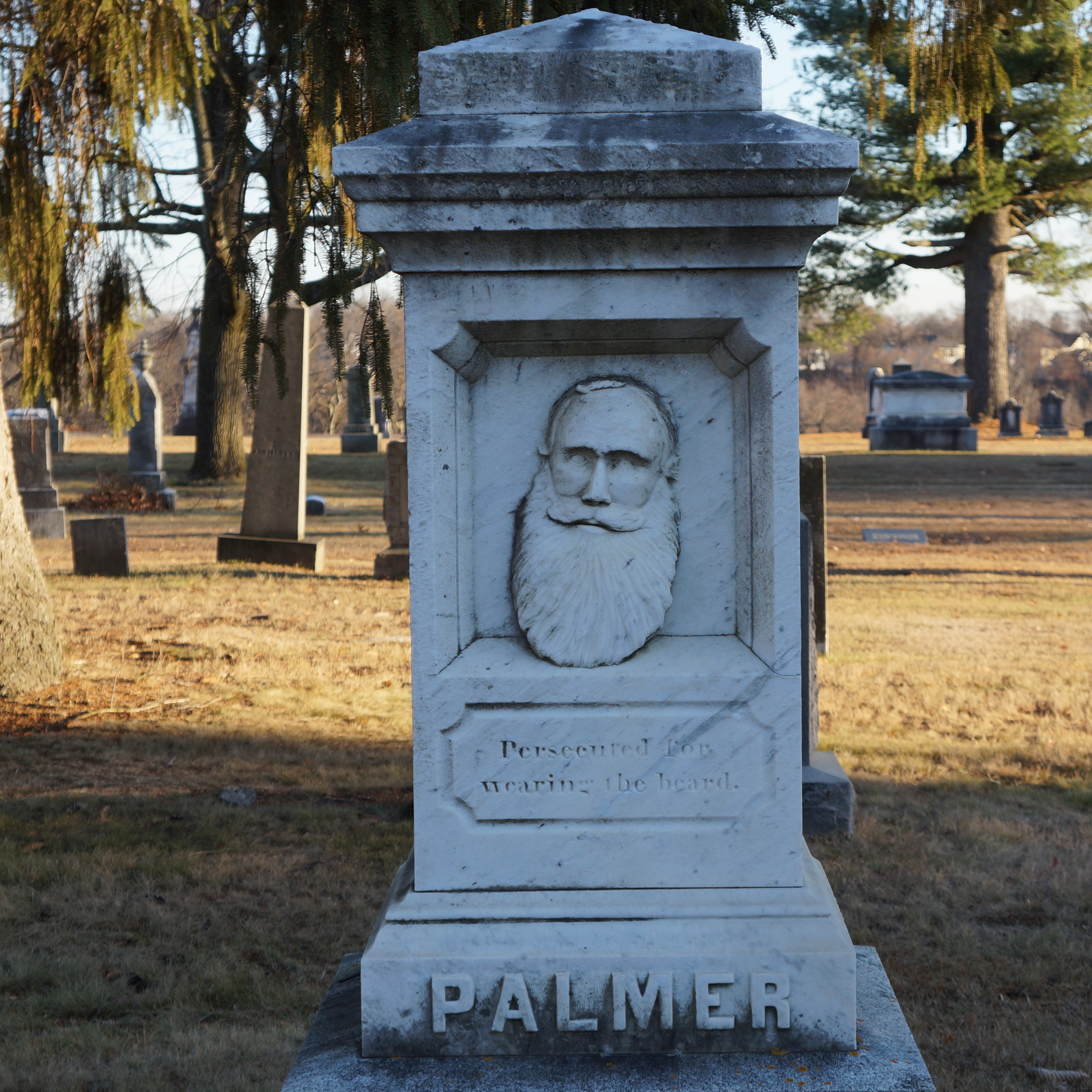
Grave of Joseph Palmer

Palmer supported the abolition of slavery.

Palmer died in 1873, by which time beards had become widely fashionable again. He is buried in Evergreen Cemetery in North Leominster and his grave marker bears a bearded portrait of him with the inscription "Persecuted for Wearing the Beard".

== Legacy ==
Palmer appears as the character Moses White in Louisa May Alcott's Transcendental Wild Oats.

Harvard Law School's Zechariah Chafee cited Palmer's case in his classic Freedom of Speech (1920). In the context of World War I restrictions on free speech, he called Palmer's case the reductio ad abusurdum that refuted attempts to justify the imprisonment of those whose words or behavior arouse violent reactions in others.
