= Harvard Shaker Village Historic District =

Historic district in Massachusetts, United States

- U.S. National Register of Historic Places
- U.S. Historic district
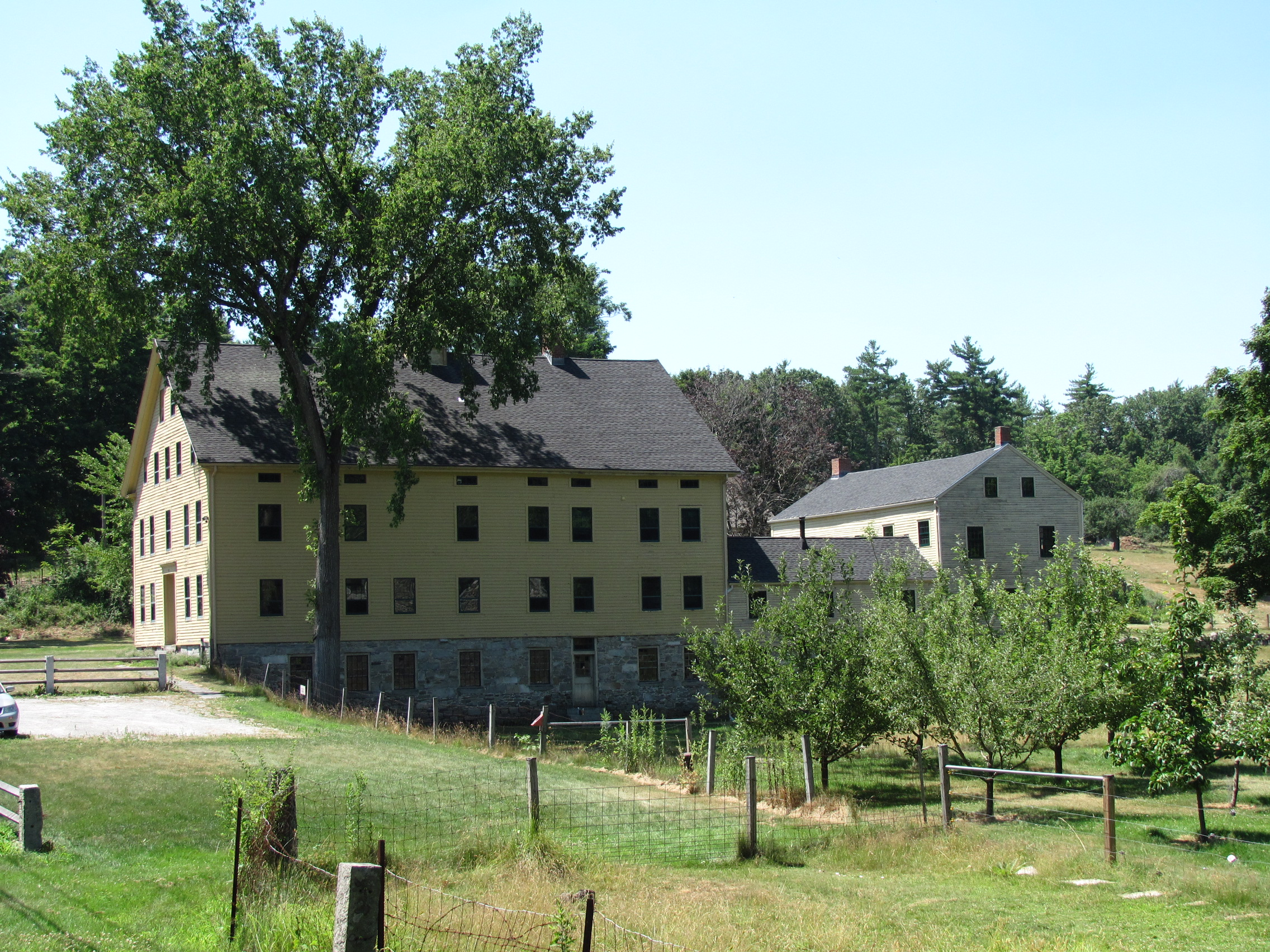
- South Family Dwelling

- Location within Massachusetts Location within the United States
- Location: Harvard, Massachusetts
- Coordinates: 42°31′57″N 71°33′33″W
- Architects: Johnson, Enfield Shaker Moses
- Architectural style: Greek Revival, Federal
- NRHP reference No.: 89001871
- Added to NRHP: October 30, 1989

Harvard Shaker Village Historic District is a historic former Shaker community located roughly on Shaker Road, South Shaker Road, and Maple Lane in Harvard, Massachusetts. It was the second oldest Shaker settlement in Massachusetts and the third oldest (after New Lebanon, New York (1787) and Hancock, Massachusetts (1790)) in the United States.

== History ==
Harvard's Shaker community began with dissenters from the local state-funded church, who left the state church and affiliated themselves with Mother Ann Lee, founder of the Shaker denomination, when she visited the community in the early 1780s. With Lee, they purchased "Square House", and in 1791, the community was called into gospel order. The Harvard Shakers "split the community into four “families”, North, East, South and the Church family (where the Ministry lived)--only the latter two remain today." A single North family building, the North family office, remains as well -- although outside the historic district.

By the early twentieth century, membership had dwindled to a handful from a peak of 200 in the 1850s, so in 1918, the community closed, and the buildings and remaining land were sold to Boston industrialist and "single tax" advocate Fiske Warren. Shortly thereafter, wealthy Boston heiress, author and antiquarian Clara Endicott Sears purchased the 1794 Shaker office building and moved it to the nearby Fruitlands Museum, where it opened in 1922 as the first Shaker Museum in the United States and remains the only Harvard Shaker building open to the public. The remaining Shaker buildings are private residences and much of the surrounding land remains undeveloped through a conservation easement. The historic district was added to the National Register of Historic Places in 1989.

Music was an important part of Shaker life at Harvard. In the 1780s, several songs were attributed to their spiritual leaders, "Mother Ann's Song" and "Father James's Song." One of the best-known early Shaker hymns, "The Humble Heart," came from Harvard, with words by Eunice Wyeth and music by Thomas Hammond.

== Notable members ==
- Simon Atherton
- Tabitha Babbitt

== Images ==
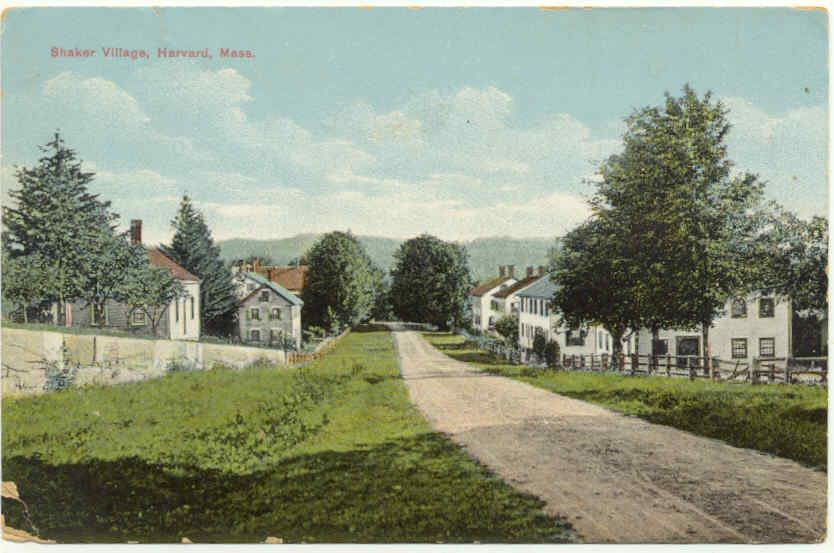
Harvard Shaker Village (c.1905)

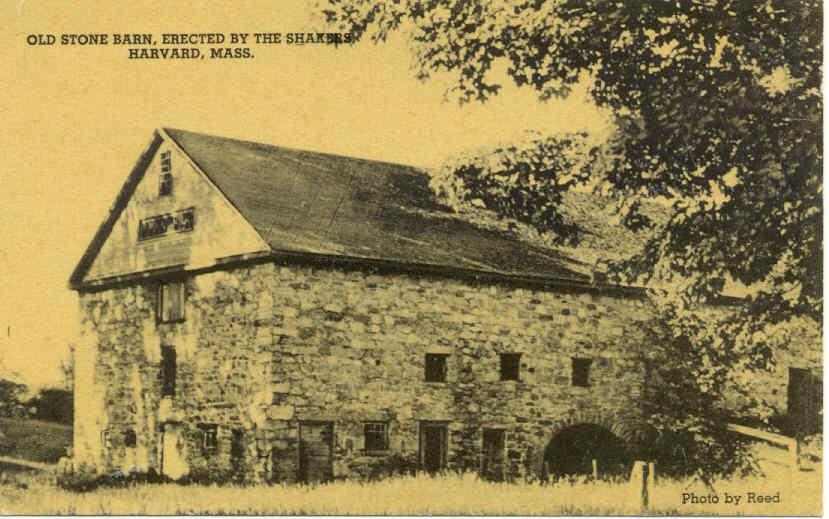
Old Stone Barn (c.1915), in Harvard Shaker Village

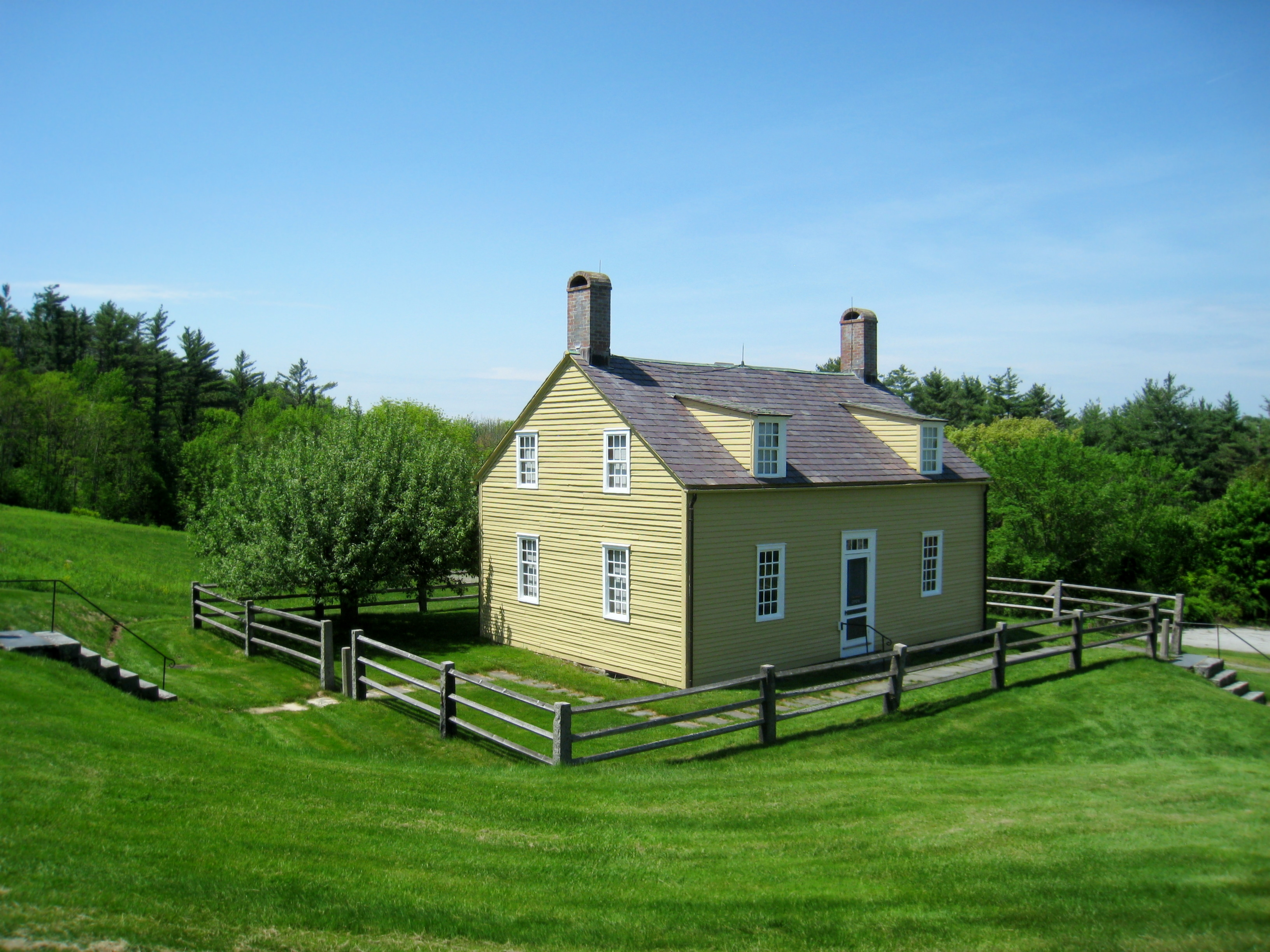
Shaker Building (built in 1794) moved to the Fruitland Museum grounds in Harvard

== See also ==
- National Register of Historic Places listings in Worcester County, Massachusetts
- http://www.harvardshakers.com/
