= Shadrach =

Shadrach or Shadrack is the name of a man in the biblical story of Shadrach, Meshach, and Abednego. It may also refer to:

== Arts and entertainment ==
=== Fictional characters ===
- Sgt. Shadrach Bickerstaff, a secondary antagonist in the British TV film Sharpe's Challenge
- Shadrach Dingle, on the British soap Emmerdale
- Shadrach Jones, the titular character in the short story "The King of the Elves" by Philip K. Dick
- Shadrach, a mercenary in the novel Perdido Street Station
- Shadrack, a mentally-ill World War I veteran in the novel Sula by Toni Morrison
- Shadrack & Duxbury, a firm of undertakers which employs the title character in the novel Billy Liar by Keith Waterhouse

=== Other arts and entertainment ===
- "Shadrack" (Robert MacGimsey song), a 1962 popular song written in the 1930s by Robert MacGimsey
- "Shadrach" (Beastie Boys song), a 1989 single by the Beastie Boys
- Shadrach (novel), a 1953 children's book by Meindert De Jong
- "Shadrach", a 1978 short story by William Styron
- Shadrach (film), a 1998 movie based on the Styron short story

== People ==
- Shadrach "Shad" Banks Jr. (born 2003), American football player
- Shadrach Bond (1773–1832), first governor of the US state of Illinois
- Shadrach A. Hall (1835–1915), American politician
- Shadrack Ireland (died 1778), cult leader
- Shadrach Kabango, Canadian hip hop musician
- Shadrack Kipchirchir (born 1989), American 10,000 m runner
- S. M. Lockridge (1913–2000), Baptist pastor in California
- Shadrach Minkins (1814–1875), African-American fugitive slave
- Shadrach Ogie (born 2001), Irish footballer
- Shadrach Roundy (1789–1872), early Latter Day Saint leader
- Shadrach Walton (1658–1741), British colonial administrator and soldier in the Province of New Hampshire
- Shadrach Woods (1923–1973), American architect, urban planner and theorist
- Azariah Shadrach (1774–1844), Welsh evangelical writer and pastor
- Gracia Shadrack, 21st century Vanuatuan politician
- Philip G. Shadrach (1840–1862), Civil War Union Army soldier who participated in the Great Locomotive Chase, awarded the Medal of Honor in 2024

== See also ==
- Dr. Gregory Herd, a Marvel Comics villain also known as Shadrac
