= Transcendental Wild Oats =

1873 work by Louisa May Alcott

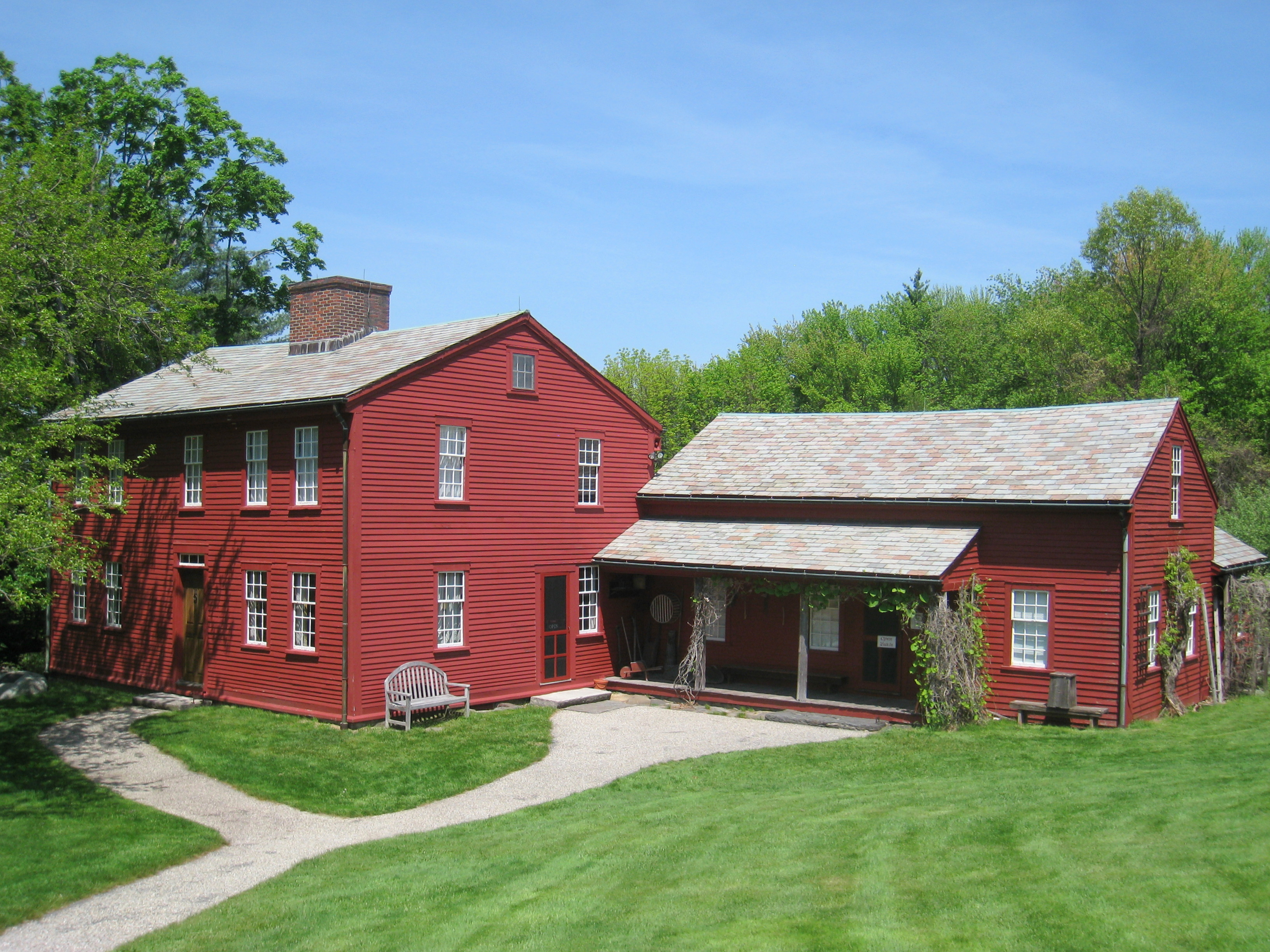
The Alcott family farmhouse at the Fruitlands Museum

Transcendental Wild Oats: A Chapter from an Unwritten Romance is a prose satire written by Louisa May Alcott, about her family's involvement with the Transcendentalist community Fruitlands in the early 1840s. The work was first published in a New York newspaper in 1873.

== Plot ==
A crisis arises at harvest time, when the grain crop is threatened by an approaching storm. In Alcott's words, "About the time the grain was ready to house, some call of the Oversoul wafted all the men away." Sister Hope organizes the only available help, three little girls and a boy, and manages to save the crop.

The little community collapses as soon as the weather turns cold, when it becomes clear that their provisions are too meager to last the coming winter. Timon Lion and his son abscond to join the Shakers—though Timon is unhappy to learn that life among them is "all work and no play." Abel is crushed by the failure of the enterprise; after days of despair he begins to eat again only when he realizes that his family needs him. Sister Hope finds a way for them to subsist and persevere.

== Analysis ==
In her account, Alcott provides the real people involved with thin pseudonymous disguises. Her father Amos Bronson Alcott is "Abel Lamb", while his partner and community co-founder Charles Lane is "Timon Lion"; Abigail May Alcott, Louisa's mother and Bronson's wife, is "Sister Hope". Alcott depicts her father as dominated by his more forceful partner, and both men as feckless and impractical dreamers. The men of the community spend their time in pointless debates while Sister Hope works from dawn to dusk to maintain their existence.

Alcott's view of male arrogance and female exploitation in this piece is paralleled in her novel Work, published in the same year as Transcendental Wild Oats.

== Editions ==
The work was first published in a New York newspaper in 1873, and reprinted in 1874, 1876, and 1915 and after.

Transcendental Wild Oats has been reprinted in several modern editions.

== Adaptations ==
An hour long radio adaptation was broadcast on BBC Radio 4 in February 2026, starring Louisa Harland and Alistair Petrie.
