= Nourse-Farwell House =

House in Harvard, Massachusetts

Coordinates: 42.501°N 71.585°W

- Summer 2015
- Alternative names: Nourse House, Farwell House, John House

General information
- Architectural style: Federal
- Address: 5 Elm Street
- Town or city: Harvard, Massachusetts
- Country: United States
- Current tenants: Private
- Completed: 1800

Design and construction
- Architect(s): Benjamin Nourse

The Nourse-Farwell House is located in the Harvard Center Historic District, a U.S. Historic District in the center of Harvard, Massachusetts.

The house is believed to have been built in c. 1800 by Harvard resident Benjamin Nourse. The house was sold in 1833 to John Farwell who served as a Harvard town selectman in 1854 and assessor from 1860 to 1863.

The house still stands today located on Elm Street located off of the Harvard Town Common.
