= Simon Atherton =

American Shaker (1803-1888

Simon Tuttle Atherton
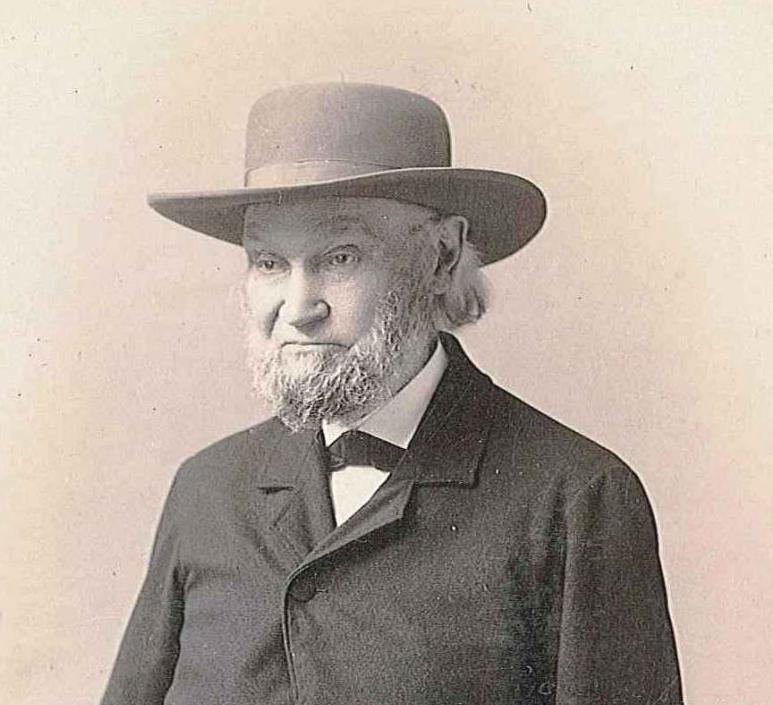
- Born: May 19, 1803; Shirley, Massachusetts, U.S.
- Died: October 7, 1888 (aged 85); Harvard, Massachusetts, U.S.
- Occupations: Shaker, Herb vendor

Simon Tuttle Atherton (May 19, 1803 – October 7, 1888) was an early American Shaker, who became highly successful on behalf of his own community, in selling herbs in and around Boston, Massachusetts.

== Early years ==
He was born in Shirley, Massachusetts, the son of Jonathan Atherton and Rhoda Heald. The youngest of six children. His father died when he was six months old. He was admitted in 1808, at just five years of age, along with his sister, Sylvia, into the Harvard Shakers. His other sister Nancy was sent to another Shaker community.

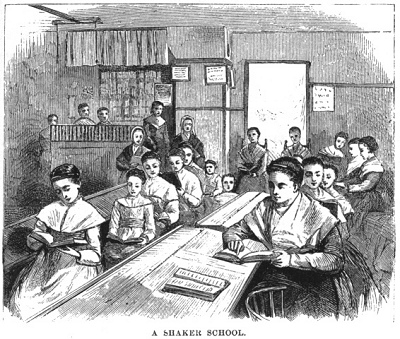

== Life as a Shaker ==
The Shaker community in Harvard, Massachusetts began when a group of dissenters from the local state-funded church, left and set up the "Square House", having affiliated themselves with Mother Ann Lee, the founder of the Shaker denomination, when she visited Harvard, Massachusetts. After 1821, there was no one single leader, but rather a small nucleus of ministry elders and eldresses with authority over all the Shaker villages, each with their own teams of elders and eldresses who were subordinate to the Ministry.

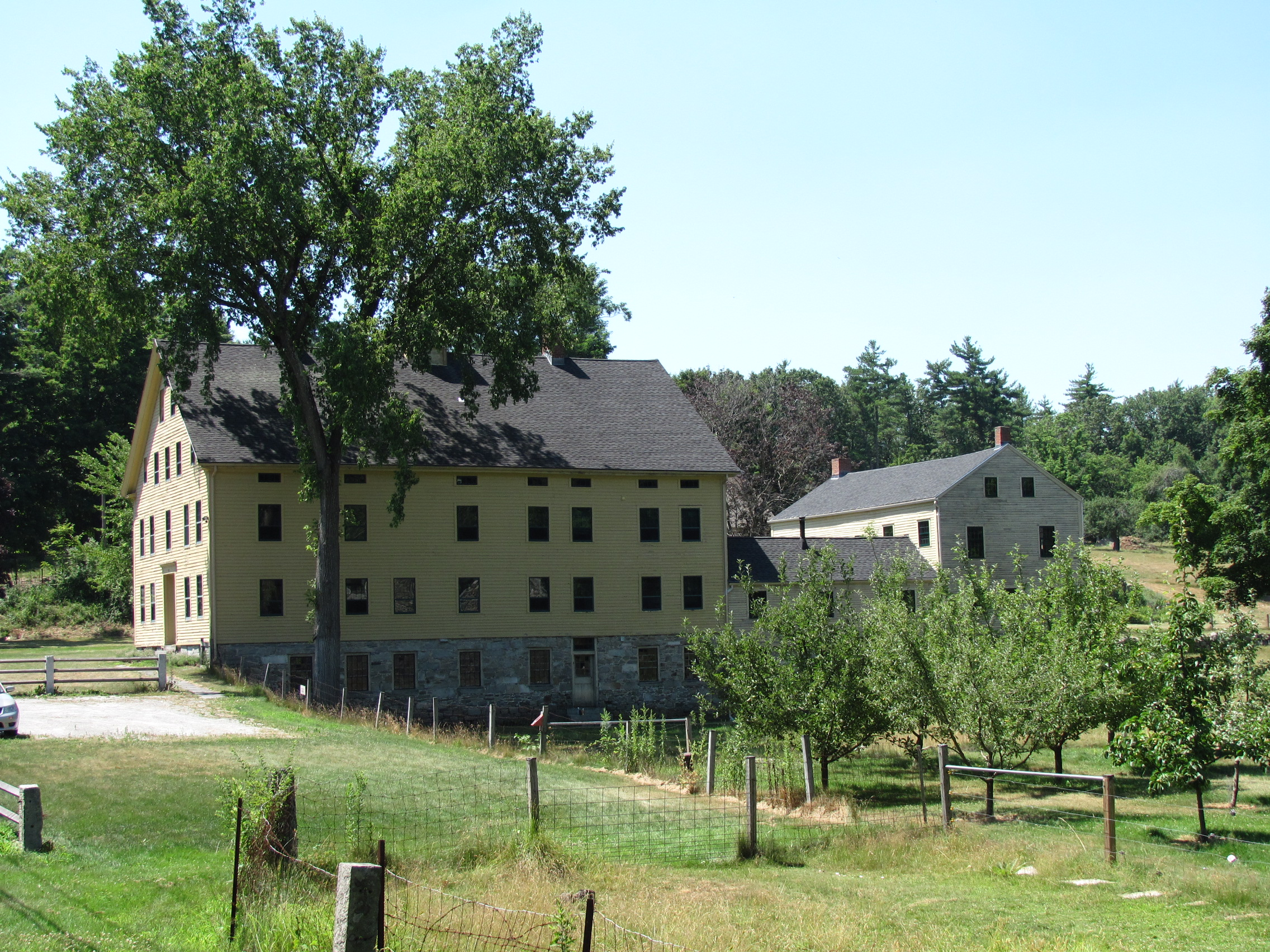
Harvard Shaker Village

Atherton would have been referred to within this community as “Brother Simon Atherton”. In 1833 he became one of the Trustees of the Church family, a position of financial responsibility he would hold the remainder of his life.

== Trustee of the Shaker Society ==
He served as trustee in the community in Harvard for over 50 years from 1833 to 1888. He borrowed the saying:

“A good name is better than riches”

and used it as his motto for the communities herb industry, which is quoted, even today, on the Shaker Workshops page.

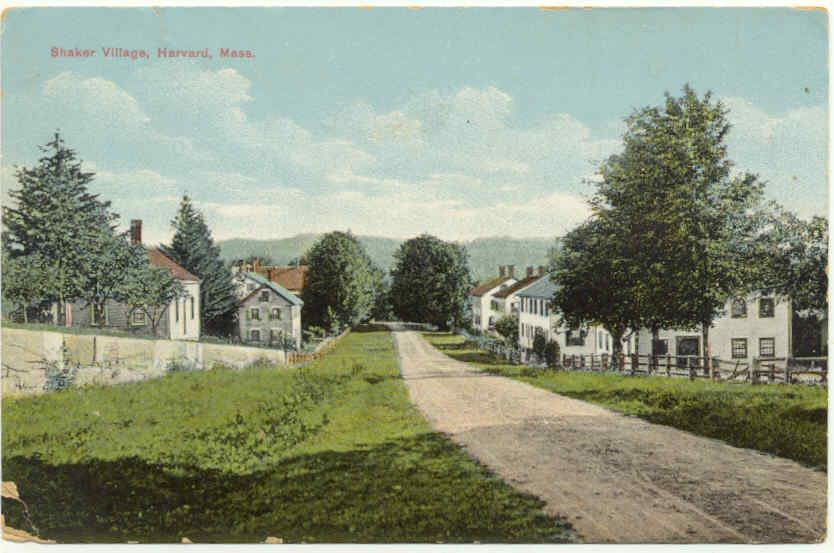

== Dealer in medicinal herbs ==
Atherton was a dealer in medicinal herbs for the Shaker Society. The Shaker day journals during his era recorded his efforts “Simon goes to Boston.”

By 1835 the herb industry in Harvard was a major business. In order to support demand, the Harvard Shakers constructed a Herb Drying House in 1848 and a Herb Barn in 1849.

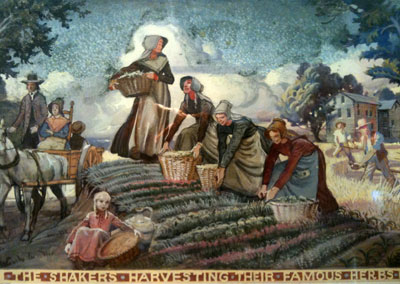

Efficient production, drying, and marketing of high-quality herbs resulted in worldwide sales of over 18 tons in 1855. Atherton is credited with building up their seed business. Membership of the community was vital to such expansion and during Atherton's time in this community membership went on to peak at 200 in the 1850s.

Atherton had become a renowned Shaker businessman who promoted his community to outsiders, with his medicinal herbs whilst in Boston, and would spend at least two days a week at the Massachusetts State House representing the Shaker's business interests. He lodged at Boston's Quincy House for many years and was regarded as a regular boarder.

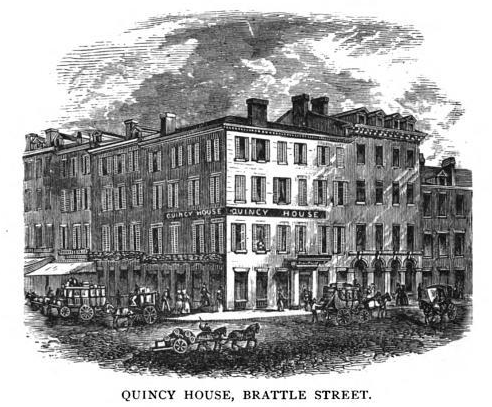

== Personal ==
His sister, Sylvia Atherton (1801–1866) lived in the same Shaker community in Harvard. However, his elder sister, Nancy Atherton (1797–1873) was admitted to the shaker community in Shirley, where became a seamstress, and is buried in the Shirley Shaker Cemetery.

== Death ==
Atherton died on October 7, 1888, at the age of 85. He is buried at the Shaker Burying Ground in Harvard.

== Legacy ==
He is listed in the A-Z of Shakers as a “notable shaker”, along with Tabitha Babbitt, Grove Blanchard, Elijah Myrick, William Leonard, Augustus Grosvenor, Roxalana Grosvenor, Olive Hatch, Hannah Kendall and Annie Walker.

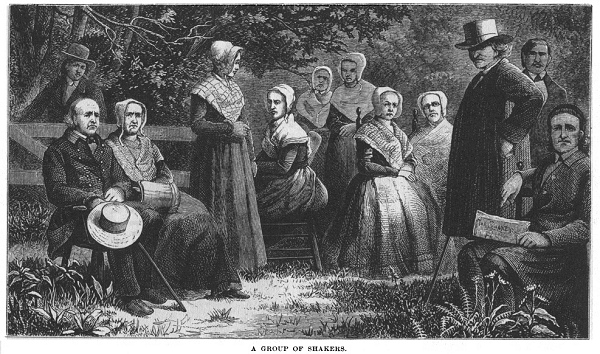
A group of Shakers, published in 1875

== Ancestry ==
He was the third generation of Atherton's to have resided in Shirley, Massachusetts, His grandfather Amos married Lydia Gould of Shirley in 1758. Prior to that his paternal ancestors had resided in Lancaster, Massachusetts having been pioneer settlers to the area. He is a direct descendant of James Atherton, who arrived in Dorchester, Boston, Massachusetts, in the 1630s. The Atherton family ancestry originated from Lancashire, England.

== See also ==
- Shirley Shaker Village
- Harvard Shaker Village Historic District
- Shaker communities
- Early chronology of Shakers
- Hancock Shaker Village
