= Frederick Fiske and Gretchen Osgood Warren House =

Historic house in Massachusetts, United States

- U.S. National Register of Historic Places
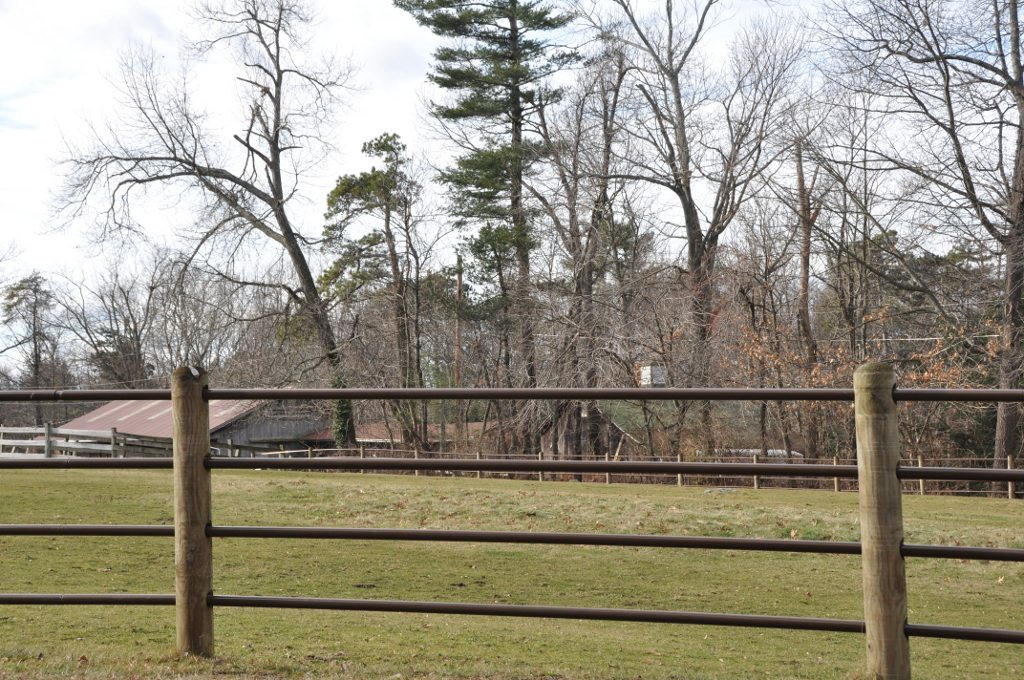

- Location within Massachusetts Location within the United States
- Location: 42 Bolton Rd., Harvard, Massachusetts, United States
- Coordinates: 42°29′21″N 71°35′6″W
- Area: 10 acres (4.0 ha)
- Built: 1894, 1940
- Architectural style: Shingle Style, Bungalow/Craftsman
- NRHP reference No.: 96001466
- Added to NRHP: December 6, 1996

The Frederick Fiske Warren and Gretchen Osgood Warren House, known to the family as The Hutch, is a historic house at 42 Bolton Road in Harvard, Massachusetts. Built in 1894, it was the summer home of Frederick Fiske Warren and Gretchen Osgood Warren, who organized a major enclave of Georgist single tax properties in Harvard. The property was added to the National Register of Historic Places in 1996.

== Description and history ==
The Warren House is located in a rural-residential part of Harvard south of the town center, on the west side of Bolton Road. The 10 acres (4.0 ha) of land on which it stands are separated from the road by subdivided portions of the former Warren estate, with only a narrow access drive connecting it to the street. The house is a large three-story frame structure, finished in wooden shingles. It has two substantial sections, one two stories in height and the other three, which are exposed to their full height on the west side of the sloping lot. The main entrance is on the east side, sheltered by a gabled portico. The interior is finished in rich Arts and Crafts finishes, and is organized with large public entertainment spaces on the upper level, with bedrooms and service areas on the lower levels.

The house was built in 1894 as a summer home for Fiske Warren and his wife, Gretchen Osgood Warren. The Warrens were scions of Boston Brahmin families who moved in the circles of high Boston society. Fiske Warren was politically and personally eccentric, espousing anti-imperialism, in particular with respect to American involvement in The Philippines. In the 1890s he came to adopt the views of reformer Henry George on the subject of taxation, and sought to establish a community in Harvard that followed Georgist principles of land use, development, and taxation. Known as "Tahanto", the enclave, spanning several thousand acres scattered across parts of Harvard, was substantially supported and organized by Warren, and eventually declined and dissolved after his death in 1938. The parcel containing the house remained in the family into the 1970s, and is presently operated as a horse farm.

In 1940, the house was renovated by W.P. Blodgett and A.F. Law Associated Architects of Boston, Massachusetts. During this renovation, the servants quarters, which were once a separate building with an attached upperstory walkway, were moved to the main building. The current two-car garage opposite the main entrance was created out of the foundation of the servant's quarters. A photograph of the house's pre-1940 configuration was published by the Harvard Historical Society in "The Harvard Album".

== See also ==
- National Register of Historic Places listings in Worcester County, Massachusetts
