= Harvard Center Historic District =

Historic district in Massachusetts, United States

- U.S. National Register of Historic Places
- U.S. Historic district
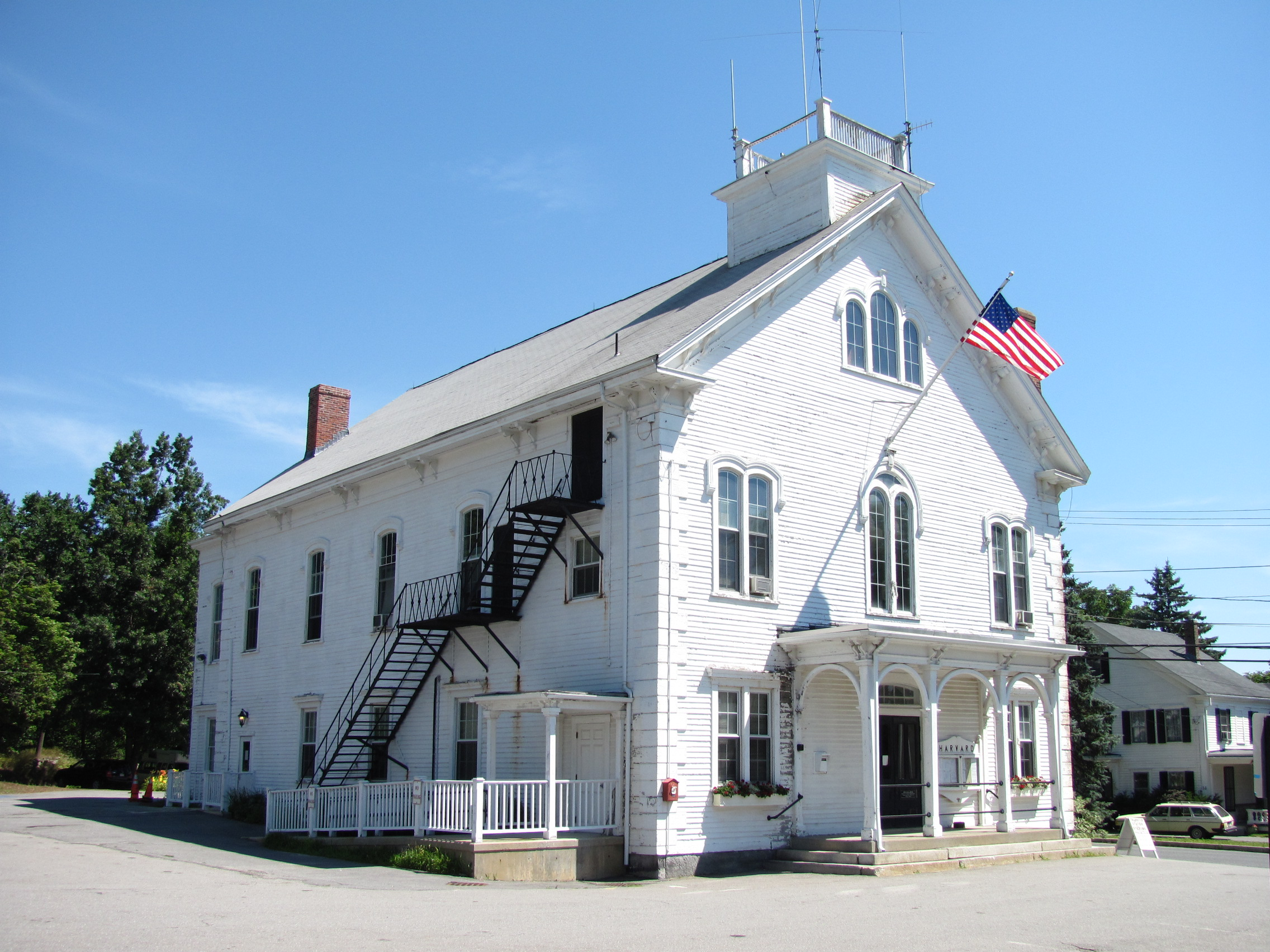
- Harvard Town Hall

- Location within Massachusetts Location within the United States
- Location: Ayer, Still River, Old Littleton, Bolton and Oak Hill Rds, Elm and Fairbanks Sts, Lovers Ln., Mass. Ave., Harvard, Massachusetts
- Coordinates: 42°29′52″N 71°35′1″W
- Area: 125 acres (51 ha)
- Architect: multiple
- Architectural style: Colonial, Greek Revival, Federal
- NRHP reference No.: 97001091
- Added to NRHP: September 22, 1997

The Harvard Center Historic District is a historic district encompassing the traditional village center of Harvard, Massachusetts, USA. The district is centered on the town common, a triangular grassy space bounded by Elm Street, Still River Road, and Ayer Road. The common is ringed by residences, civic and religious buildings, and a small commercial area. The common was laid out when the town was founded in 1732, and has grown, mainly in periods of growth at the late 18th and late 19th/early 20th centuries. Most of the village's buildings post-date 1831. The district was added to the National Register of Historic Places in 1997.

The historic district is roughly cruciform in shape, radiating out from the common along Still River Road (west), Massachusetts Avenue (Massachusetts Route 111) to the north and south, and Oak Hill Road and Old Littleton Road to the east. It covers about 125 acres (51 ha), and includes 59 historically significant houses, that range in architectural styles and age from the 18th to 20th centuries. The main civic buildings are located at the northern end of the common, and include a stone animal pound, a small powder house, and the 1872 Gothic Revival town hall, which stands next to an older (1828) Greek Revival frame building, now a residence, that also served as town hall.

The district is home to two church buildings: the 1867 Colonial Revival First Congregational Church, set on the location of the town's first colonial meeting house, and the 1840 Methodist meeting house, now a private residence at 13 Massachusetts Avenue. Two of its architecturally most sophisticated buildings are the Bromfield School (1878, Romanesque Revival) designed by Peabody & Stearns, and the public library (1886, also Romanesque) designed by William Channing Whitney.

== See also ==
- National Register of Historic Places listings in Worcester County, Massachusetts
- Nourse-Farwell House
