= Fruitlands (transcendental center) =

1840s American agrarian commune

- U.S. National Register of Historic Places
- U.S. National Historic Landmark District
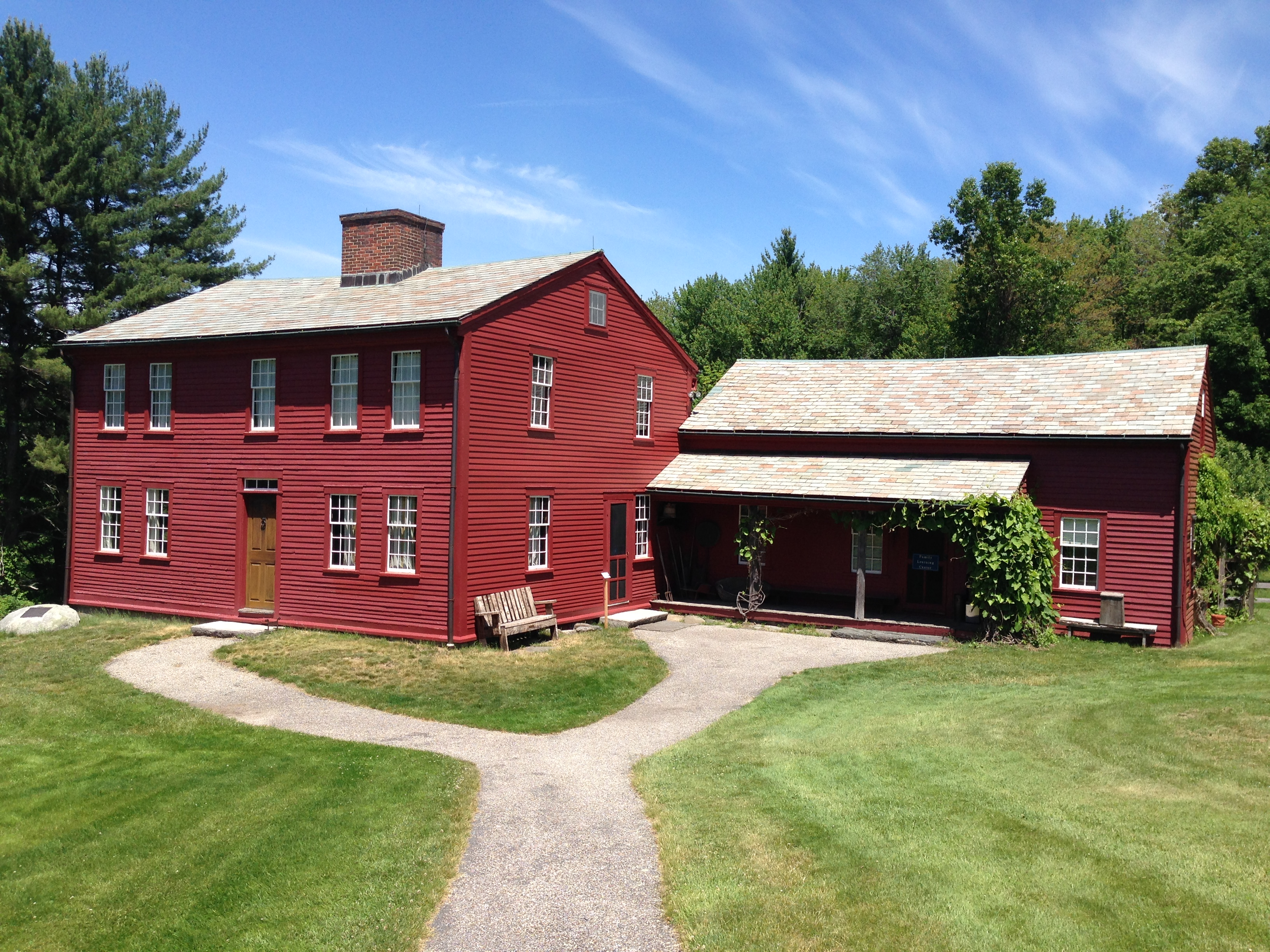
- Farmhouse at Fruitlands (photographed in 2015)

- Location within Massachusetts Location within the United States
- Location: Harvard, Massachusetts
- Coordinates: 42°30′34″N 71°36′45″W
- Built: 1843
- NRHP reference No.: 74001761
- Added to NRHP: March 19, 1974

Fruitlands was a utopian agrarian commune established in Harvard, Massachusetts, United States, by Amos Bronson Alcott and Charles Lane in the 1840s and based on transcendentalist principles. An account of its activities can be found in Transcendental Wild Oats by Alcott's daughter Louisa May Alcott.

Lane purchased what was known as the Wyman farm and its 90 acres (36 ha), which also included a dilapidated house and barn. Residents of Fruitlands ate no animal substances, drank only water, bathed in unheated water, and "no artificial light would prolong dark hours or cost them the brightness of morning." Additionally, property was held communally, and no animal labor was used.

The community lasted seven months. It was dependent on farming, which turned out to be too difficult. The original farmhouse is now a part of Fruitlands Museum, along with other historic buildings from the area.

== History ==
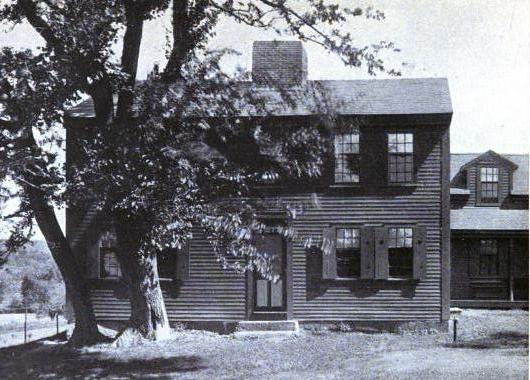
Fruitlands photographed in 1915

Amos Bronson Alcott, a teacher and member of the New England Non-Resistance Society, came up with the idea of Fruitlands in 1841. He traveled to England the following year, where he hoped to find support and people to participate with him in the experiment. England was home to his strongest group of supporters, a group of educators who had founded the Alcott House, a school based on his philosophy of teaching. One of his supporters was Charles Lane, who journeyed with him to the United States on October 21, 1842.

In May 1843, Lane purchased the 90-acre (36 ha) Wyman Farm in Harvard, Massachusetts, for $1800. Though Alcott had come up with the idea of Fruitlands himself, he was not involved in purchasing the land, largely because he was penniless after the failure of his Temple School and his subsequent years in Concord, Massachusetts, as a farmer. In July, Alcott announced their plans in The Dial: "We have made an arrangement with the proprietor of an estate of about a hundred acres, which liberates this tract from human ownership". They had officially moved to the farm on June 1 and optimistically named it "Fruitlands" despite there being only ten old apple trees on the property.

In principle, the Fruitlands reformers did not believe in purchasing property; Lane said the following on the subject: "We do not recognize the purchase of land; but its redemption from the debasing state of proprium, or property, to divine uses, we clearly understand; where those whom the world esteems owners are found yielding their individual rights to the Supreme Owner" The commune attracted 14 residents, including the Alcott and Lane families. By July, the community had succeeded in planting 8 acres (3.2 ha) of grains, one of vegetables, and one of melons. On July 8, Ralph Waldo Emerson visited along with Ellery Channing. Although he was impressed by the serenity of the site and the idea of hard work, he cautiously recorded, "I will not prejudge them successful ... They look well in July. We will see them in December."

Alcott and Lane collaborated on a letter which was published in the New York Evening Tribune on September 1 and soon republished elsewhere. In the article, titled "The Consociate Family Life", the duo explained their main purpose was to improve society through "simplicity in diet, plain garments, pure bathing, unsullied dwellings".

Fruitlands ultimately failed the winter after it opened, largely due to food shortages and accompanying unrest in the inhabitants. The rigors of a New England winter proved too severe for the members of the Fruitlands.

== Philosophy ==
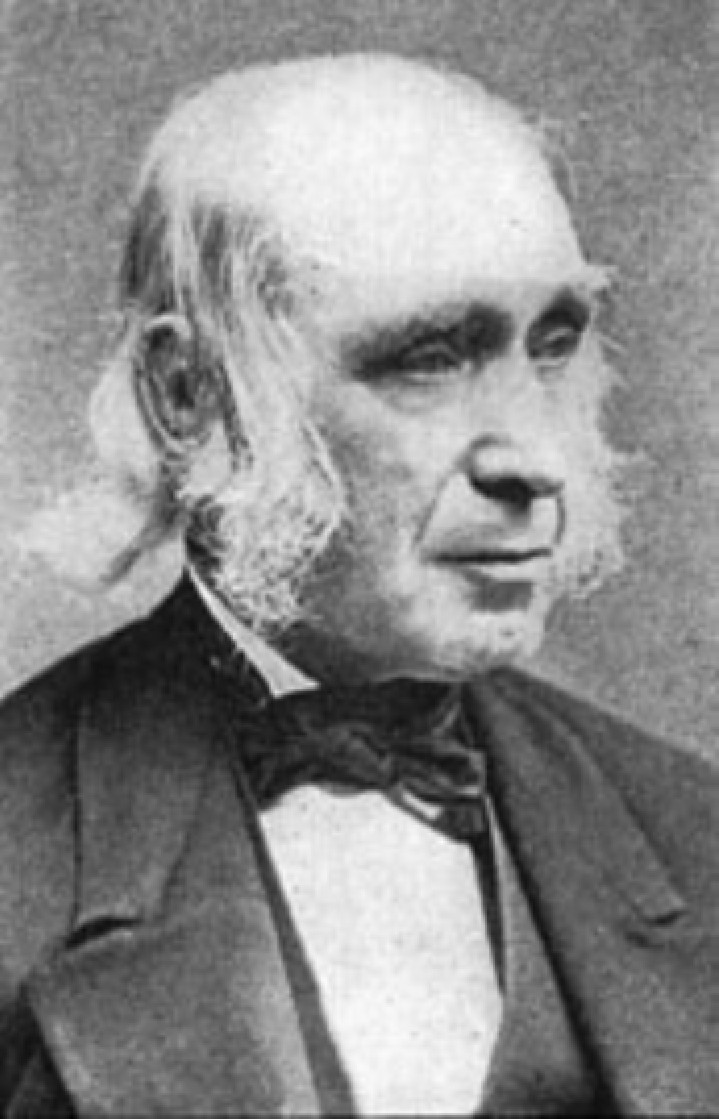
Fruitlands co-founder Amos Bronson Alcott

Many of Alcott's and Lane's ideas were derived from Transcendentalism. They were influenced by the Transcendental ideas of God not as the traditional view from the Bible but as a world spirit. Alcott's view of Transcendentalism was a sort of religious anarchism, a renunciation of the world to focus on the spirit. The members of Fruitlands believed that spiritual regeneration was linked to physical health, that "outward abstinence is a sign of inward fullness". Though it was based on working together as a community, Fruitlands also hoped for individualistic improvement. Alcott also believed in the perfect intuition of children and, therefore, put a strong emphasis on education and hoped that their innocence would have a rejuvenating effect on elders.

=== Economy ===
Fruitlands residents, who called themselves "the consociate family", wished to separate themselves from the world economy by refraining from trade, having no personal property, and not using hired labor. Alcott and Lane believed that the community could achieve complete freedom only by eliminating economic activity altogether. Alcott in particular believed the present economy was evil. To this end, they strove towards self-sufficiency by planning on growing all the food they would need themselves and making only the goods they needed. By accomplishing these two goals, they would eliminate the need to participate in trade or to purchase their food from the outside world. Initially, Bronson Alcott and Lane modeled their ideas about personal property on the Shakers, who held property communally. However, the Shakers were not completely self-sufficient; they traded their hand-made goods for coffee, tea, meat and milk. Bronson Alcott and Lane eliminated the need to trade for these supplies because they eliminated animal products and stimulants from their diets entirely.

In the end, the Fruitlands community had no effect on the economy of the outside world; Fruitlands allowed its residents to practice their ideals without forcing them to effect any real change.

=== Lifestyle and diet ===
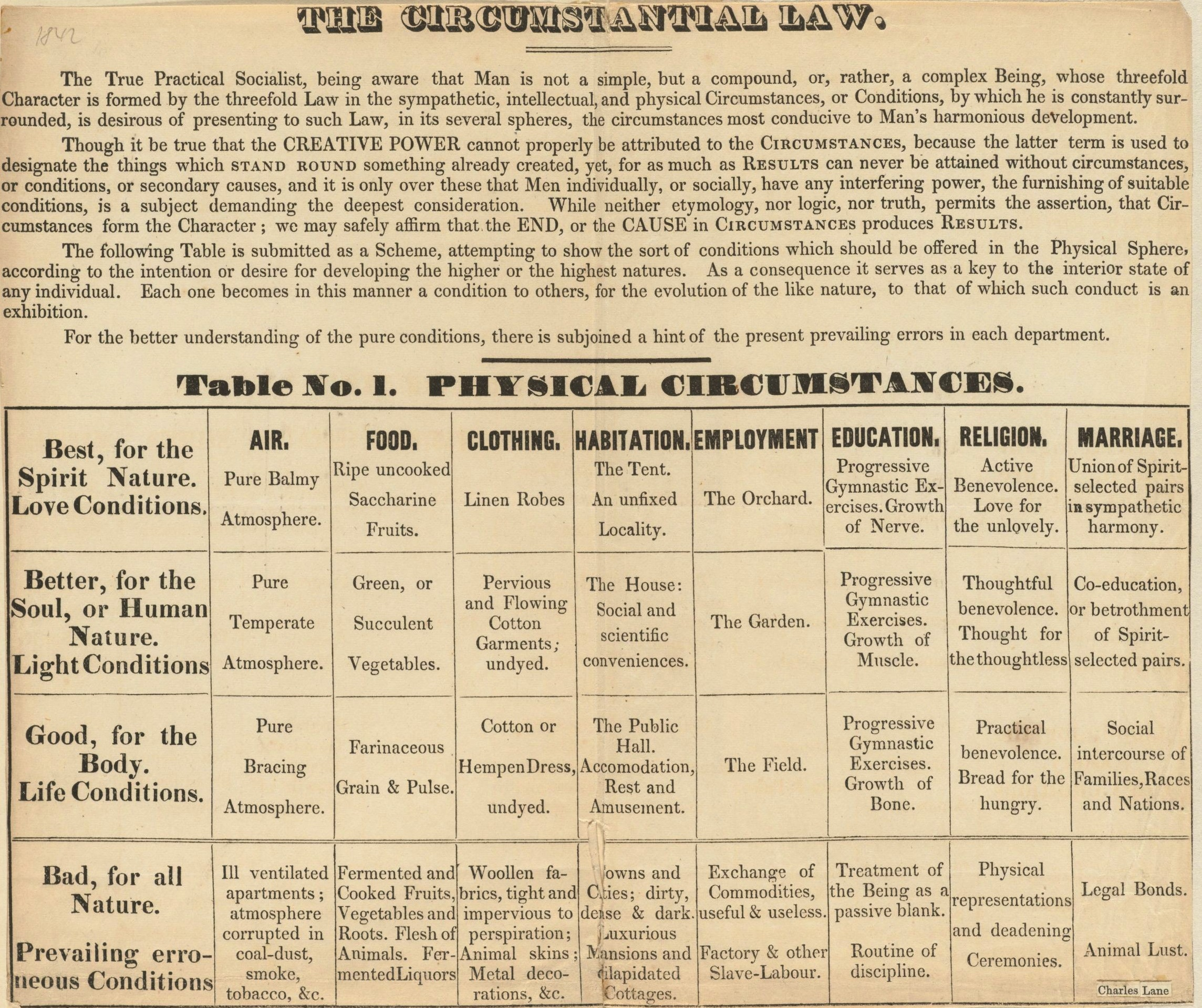
Greaves' Table of the Circumstantial Law, as revised by Fruitlands co-founder Charles Lane

Fruitlands residents began their days with a purging cold-water shower and subsisted on a simple diet containing no stimulants or animal products. They were vegans, excluding even milk and honey from their diets. "Neither coffee, tea, molasses, nor rice tempts us beyond the bounds of indigenous production," Lane wrote. "No animal substances neither flesh, butter, cheese, eggs, nor milk pollute our tables, nor corrupt our bodies." Diet was usually fruit and water; many vegetables—including carrots, beets, and potatoes—were forbidden because they showed a lower nature by growing downward.

Fruitlands members wore only linen clothes and canvas shoes; cotton fabric was forbidden because it exploited slave labor and wool was banned because it came from sheep. Bronson Alcott and Lane believed that animals should not be exploited for their meat or their labor, so they used no animals for farming. This arose out of two beliefs: that animals were less intelligent than humans and that, therefore, it was the duty of humans to protect them; and that using animals "tainted" their work and food, since animals were not enlightened and therefore unclean. Eventually, as the winter was coming, Alcott and Lane compromised and allowed an ox and a cow.

== Residents ==
There were no formal admission requirements or procedures to join the community at Fruitlands, and there was no official record-keeping of members. Many residents stayed only for a short period of time and most lists are based on the journals of Alcott's wife Abby May. Residents of the Fruitlands came to be called "consecrated cranks" and followed strict principles and virtues. They strongly believed in the ideas of simplicity, sincerity, and brotherly love.

- Amos Bronson Alcott – Born in 1799, Bronson Alcott was a prominent educator and Transcendentalist who believed in eliminating corporal punishment, and incorporating field trips, physical education, art and music into the curriculum.
- Abigail Alcott – Abigail was Bronson Alcott's wife and also a reformer. She was one of only two women who lived at Fruitlands, and was primarily responsible for taking care of the house and farm, as well as raising her four children.
- Louisa May Alcott – The Alcotts' second daughter, her short piece Transcendental Wild Oats was written about her experiences at Fruitlands.
- Charles Lane – Lane met Bronson Alcott in England in 1841, at which time Lane was living at the Alcott House school in Surrey. His strict views on living a "pure" life were ultimately part of what destroyed the Fruitlands community. His son was also a resident of Fruitlands.
- Joseph Palmer – Palmer joined Fruitlands in August 1843, and stayed through the demise of the commune, later purchasing the farm and founding another utopian society there. He was famous for wearing a full beard, despite social stigma against it; he had even served time in prison for defending his right to wear a beard.
- Isaac Hecker – Hecker began life as a baker in New York City, but then went through a progression of religious and spiritual explorations. He resided at Brook Farm, another Transcendentalist community, for six months before joining the Fruitlands community. He was initially attracted by the "deeper" spiritual life at Fruitlands compared to Brook Farm, though he only stayed for two months. He later became a Roman Catholic priest.
- Samuel Larned – Like Hecker, Larned lived briefly at Brook Farm before coming to Fruitlands. He was known for using foul language because he believed that swears said with a pure heart uplifted listeners.
- Abraham Everett – Also known as Abraham Woods, he changed his name upon his arrival at Fruitlands, to Wood Abram. He had once been committed to an insane asylum before joining Fruitlands.
- Samuel Bower – Bower lived at Fruitlands for only a few months, after which he left to experiment with nudism, believing that clothes "stifled the spirit".
- Ann Page – Besides Abby May Alcott, Page was the only adult female member of Fruitlands. Page and Mrs. Alcott were responsible for most of the household chores and often had to take care of the farm as well. Page was eventually kicked out of Fruitlands, supposedly for eating a piece of fish, which was forbidden in the community.

== Dissolution and legacy ==
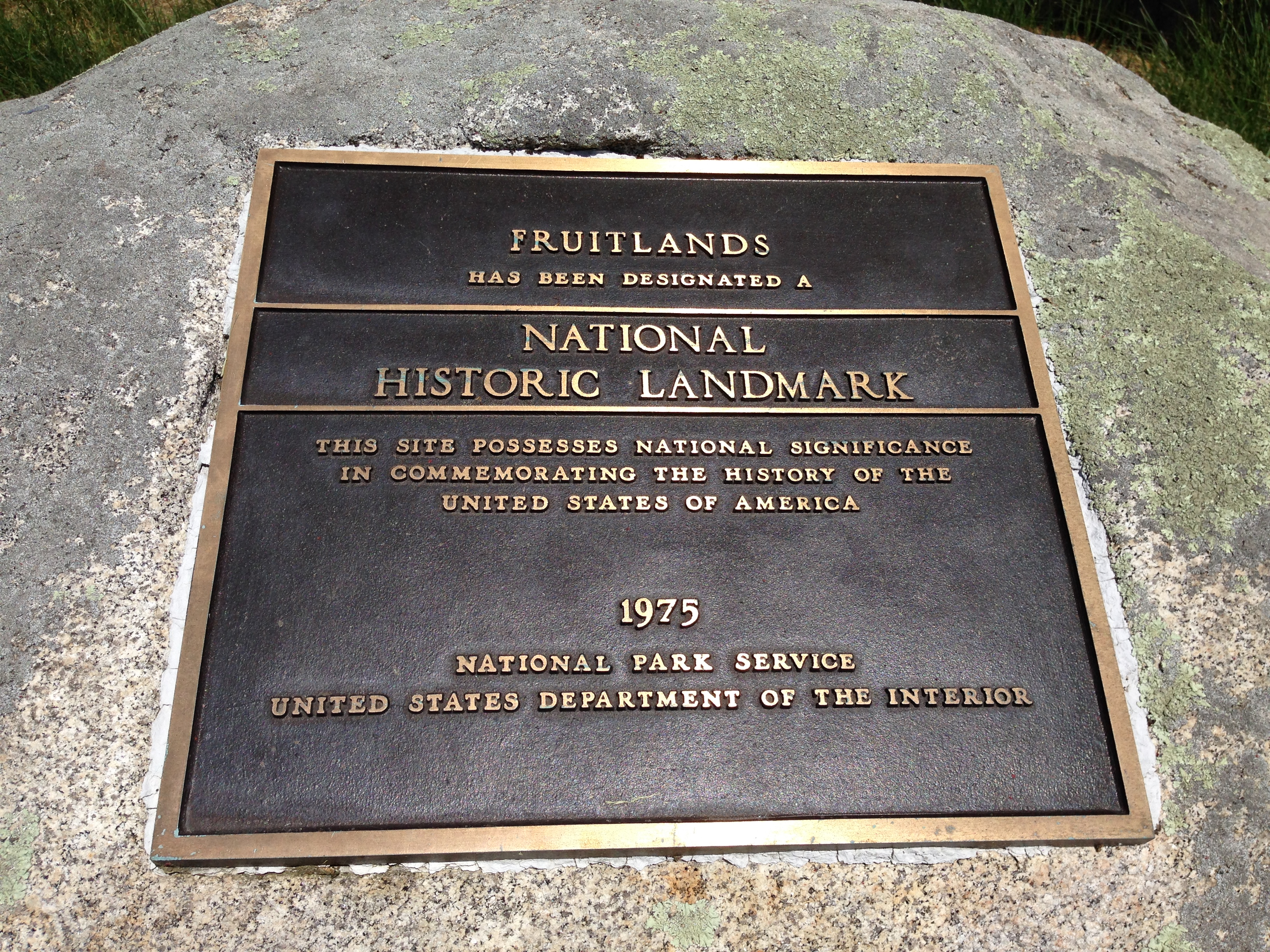
Historical marker at the former site of Fruitlands

The biggest challenge at Fruitlands was farming. The community had arrived at the farm a month behind the planting schedule and only about 11 acres (4.5 ha) of land were arable. The decision not to use animal labor on the farm proved to be the undoing of the commune, combined with the fact that many of the men of the commune spent their days teaching or philosophizing instead of working in the field. Using only their own hands, the Fruitlands residents were incapable of growing a sufficient amount of food to get them through the winter.

Fruitlands was also hampered by its structure. Alcott and Lane wielded nearly limitless authority and dictated very strict and repressive models for living. "I am prone to indulge in an occasional hilarity", wrote Alcott's wife Abby May, "but seem frowned down into still quiet and peace-less order ... [and] am almost suffocated in this atmosphere of restriction and form". The Fruitlands experiment ended only seven months after it began. According to Bronson Alcott, the inhabitants left Fruitlands in January 1844; his daughter, Louisa May, wrote that they left in December 1843, which is considered to be the more accurate date. Alcott was deeply dismayed by the failure of Fruitlands and, moving with his family to live with a nearby farmer, refused to eat for several days. Later, Ralph Waldo Emerson helped purchase a home for the family in Concord.

Fruitlands had only a brief opportunity to impact America and the Transcendentalist movement. After it had ended, the land was bought by one of its former participants, Joseph Palmer, who for 20 years used the site as a refuge for former reformers. The property was purchased in 1910 by Clara Endicott Sears, who opened the farmhouse to the public in 1914 as a museum. Today, the Fruitlands Museum also includes a museum on Shaker life, an art gallery of nineteenth-century paintings, and a museum of Native American art and crafts.

== See also ==
- Doukhobor Canadian settlements
- List of National Historic Landmarks in Massachusetts
- National Register of Historic Places listings in Worcester County, Massachusetts

== Sources ==
- Delano, Sterling F. (2004). Brook Farm: The Dark Side of Utopia. Cambridge, MA: Belknap Press of Harvard University Press. ISBN 978-0674011601. OCLC 1028867692.
- Felton, R (2006). A Journey into the Transcendentalists' New England. Berkeley, CA: Roaring Forties Press. ISBN 978-0982341018. OCLC 1025307268.
- Francis, Richard (2010). Fruitlands: The Alcott Family and their Search for Utopia. New Haven, CN: Yale University Press. ISBN 978-0300169447. OCLC 961680839.
- Hankins, Barry (2004). The Second Great Awakening and the Transcendentalists. Westport, CN: Greenwood Press. ISBN 978-0313318481. OCLC 53986866.
- McFarland, Philip (2004). Hawthorne in Concord. New York: Grove Press. ISBN 978-1555846886. OCLC 607313521.
- Packer, Barbara (2007). The Transcendentalists. Athens: University of Georgia Press. ISBN 978-0820329581. OCLC 76871414.
- Rose, Anne (1981). Transcendentalism as a Social Movement, 1830–1850. New Haven, CN: Yale University Press. ISBN 978-0300025873. OCLC 7552731, 464603084.
