= Fruitlands Museum =

- Fruitlands Museums Historic District
- U.S. National Register of Historic Places
- U.S. Historic district
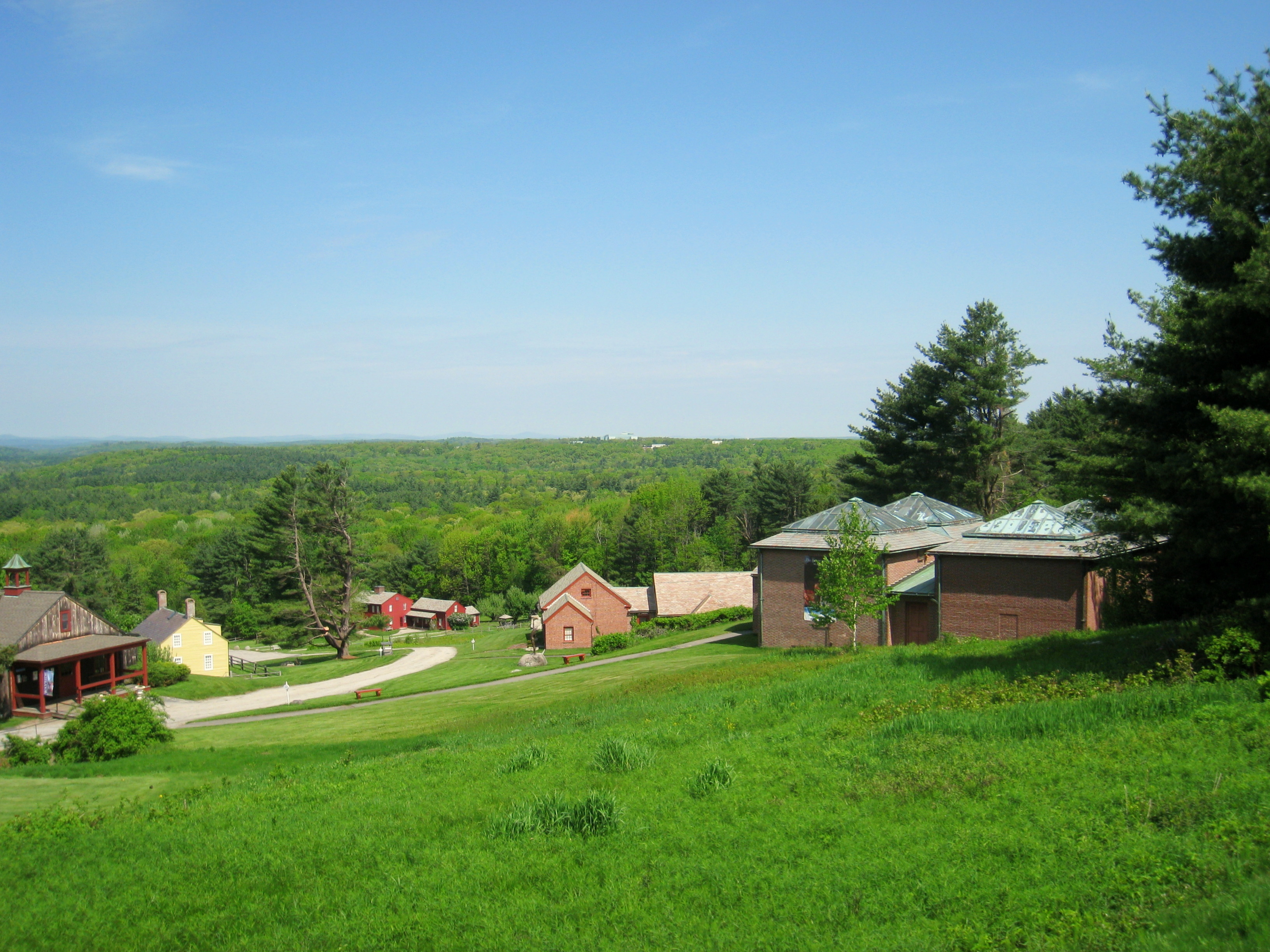
- Fruitlands Museum

- Location within Massachusetts Location within the United States
- Location: Harvard, Massachusetts
- Coordinates: 42°29′37″N 71°36′47″W
- Area: 210 acres (85 ha)
- Built: 1910
- Architectural style: Shingle Style, Bungalow/Craftsman
- NRHP reference No.: 97000439
- Added to NRHP: May 23, 1997

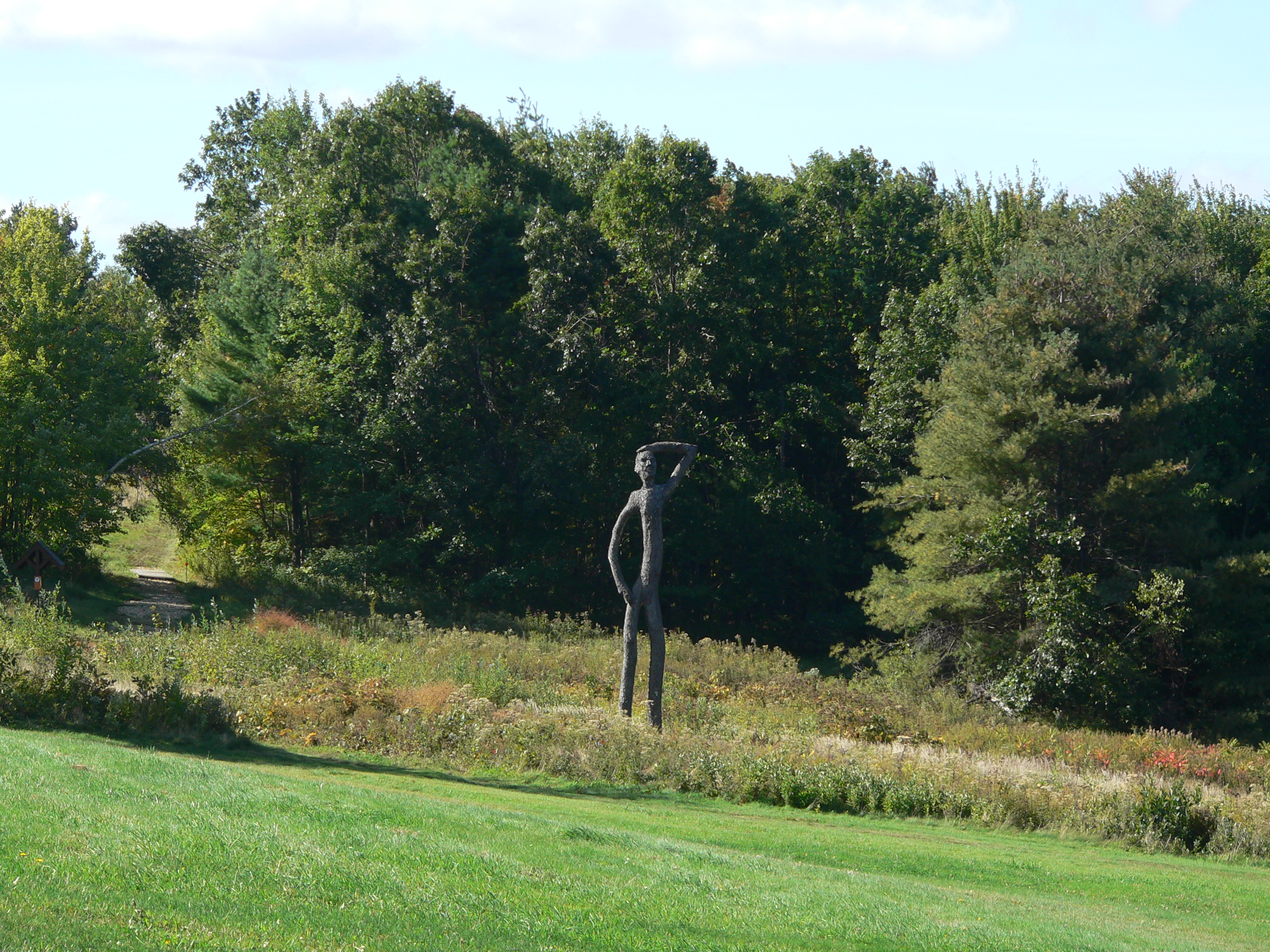
Sculpture and woodlands

Fruitlands Museum in Harvard, Massachusetts, is a museum about multiple visions of America on the site of the short-lived utopian community, Fruitlands. The museum includes the Fruitlands farmhouse (a National Historic Landmark), a museum about Shaker life, an art gallery with 19th-century landscape paintings, vernacular American portraits, and other changing exhibitions, and a museum of Native American history. In 2023, readers of USA Today voted to name Fruitlands as one of the ten best history museums in the United States.

Visitors can tour the farmhouse, which has been restored to appear as it did during the 1840s, and exhibits about Transcendentalism and the Alcott family. Fruitlands offers a diverse schedule of contemporary exhibits, lectures, outdoor concerts and easy walking trails. There is also a museum store and restaurant. The properties are overseen by The Trustees of Reservations.

== History ==
Fruitlands, inspired by Transcendentalism and Amos Bronson Alcott's ideas of societal reform, was established on 90 acres (360,000 m^{2}) purchased by Charles Lane in May 1843. People interested in joining the community began moving in the next month and the site was optimistically named "Fruitlands" despite having only a small cluster of apple trees. The community was based on self-sufficiency, using no hired labor and growing all the food they needed themselves. The community ultimately failed because of the difficulty in growing crops. Community members began moving away as early as October 1843; Lane and Alcott abandoned it in January 1844.

The property was purchased in 1910 by Clara Endicott Sears, who opened the farmhouse to the public in 1914 as a museum. In addition to the Fruitlands building, the site now includes a transplanted Shaker house from the nearby Harvard Shaker Village, Native American artifacts and Hudson River School paintings. The museum is primarily the result of the efforts of Sears, a preservationist.

From 2015 through 2019, Fruitlands was the site of an amateur cyclocross race. Notorious for the rough surface of the course as well as the often muddy off-cambers utilized, it became a favorite amongst the New England cyclocross community. No race was held in 2020, the first year of the COVID-19 pandemic. As of July 2021, no further races have been scheduled.

== The Trustees of Reservations ==
From 1930 until 2016, Fruitlands was an independent non-profit organization. In 2016, the museum merged with The Trustees of Reservations. From a report in the Boston Globe: “'Fruitlands and The Trustees’ missions are so well aligned in our desire to build connections between nature, art, and culture among people of all ages and to provide opportunities for lifelong learning and engagement,' said Marie LeBlanc, chairwoman of the Fruitlands board. 'We are confident that The Trustees will provide the platform Fruitlands needs to continue to grow, care for, and share its important legacy and collections.'" Michael Busack was appointed as museum director in 2019. In 2021, The Trustees appointed Jessica May as managing director of Art & Exhibitions, with responsibilities for oversight of both Fruitlands and the DeCordova Sculpture Park and Museum.

== See also ==
- National Register of Historic Places listings in Worcester County, Massachusetts

== Sources ==
- Felton, R (2006). A journey into the Transcendentalists' New England. Berkeley, Calif: Roaring Forties Press. ISBN 978-0982341018. OCLC 462997233.
- Hankins, Barry (2004). The Second Great Awakening and the Transcendentalists. Westport, Conn: Greenwood Press. ISBN 978-0313318481. OCLC 53986866.
- Packer, Barbara (2007). The transcendentalists. Athens: University of Georgia Press. ISBN 978-0820329581. OCLC 76871414.
