= Clara Endicott Sears =

American author, preservationist and philanthropist (1863–1960)

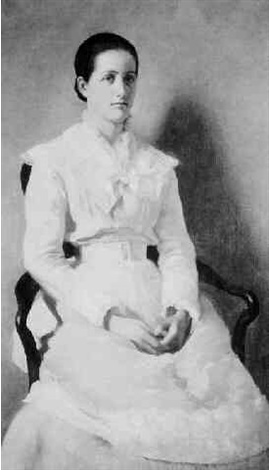
- Clara Endicott Sears by Harper Pennington, ca.1880
- Born: December 16, 1863; Boston, Massachusetts, U.S.
- Died: March 25, 1960 (aged 96); Boston, Massachusetts, U.S.
- Burial place: Mount Auburn Cemetery
- Occupations: Museum founder, author, philanthropist, preservationist
- Relatives: Philip Shelton Sears (cousin)

Clara Endicott Sears (December 16, 1863 – March 25, 1960) was an American author, preservationist, and philanthropist from Massachusetts. In 1914, she founded Fruitlands Museum, a history museum on the site of the short-lived utopian community, Fruitlands.

== Biography ==
Sears was born to a wealthy Yankee family in Boston in 1863. Her parents were Knyvet Winthrop Sears and Mary Crowninshield (Peabody) Sears. She was educated at private schools in Boston and by tutors in Europe. She authored several historical works as well as poetry, romantic works and popular songs for World War I.

In 1910 Sears purchased a summer estate in Harvard, Massachusetts, which included the farmhouse that was part of a failed Transcendentalist community known as the Fruitlands or consociate family. After restoring the house, and collecting numerous materials, Sears opened the building as the Fruitlands Museum in 1914.

On carriage rides through the Harvard countryside she came upon the Shaker village, and became close friends with the remaining sisters. When the Shaker community closed in 1918, it was purchased by Fiske Warren, a proponent for a single tax enclave. Sears purchased a small structure built in 1794 that had been used as an office building for many decades by the Harvard Shakers. Warren moved it to her property. The old office became the second museum at Fruitlands, opening in 1922, in an effort to preserve the Shaker legacy.

Sears continued to expand the museum collections, working with Warren King Moorehead to acquire Native American artifacts and redeveloping an old schoolhouse and barn on her property to display them. On either side of the building stand two bronze statues of Native warriors sculpted by her cousin, Philip Shelton Sears.

Clara Sears transferred all her museum assets to Fruitlands and the Wayside Museums, Inc., in 1930. By this time the property included about 458 acres.

Also during the 1930s, she collected early 19th-century primitive portraits and built a gallery to display them in 1939. She continued to collect Hudson River School paintings and other American folk art for the museum.

Sears was awarded a gold medal by the National Society of New England Women in 1942. She was a member of the Colonial Dames of America, the New England Historic Genealogical Society, and Society of Mayflower Descendants.

Sears died in Boston in 1960, and she was interred at Mount Auburn Cemetery. Her summer estate, Pergolas, was dismantled as per her instructions. Her papers are held by The Trustees of Reservations, which owns and manages Fruitlands Museum.

== Works ==
- Prentice Mulford's Works (compiled) (1913)
- The Power Within, writings of various New Thought authors (compiled) (1911)
- Bronson Alcott's Fruitlands (Houghton Mifflin, 1915)
- Gleanings from Old Shaker Journals (Houghton Mifflin, 1916)
- The Bell-Ringer: an old-time village tale (Houghton Mifflin, 1918)
- Peace Anthem (1919)
- The Romance of Fiddler's green (Houghton Mifflin, 1922)
- Days of Delusions, a history of the Millerites (1924)
- Whispering Pines: A Romance on a New England Hillside (1930)
- The Great Powwow (1934)
- Wind from the Hills (1935)
- Some American Primitives (1941)
- Highlights Among the Hudson River Artists (1947)
- Snapshots from Old Registers (taken from the registers of 1880–1900 of the Hotel Vendome in Boston) (1955)
- Early Personal Reminiscences in the Old George Peabody Mansion in Salem (1956).

== See also ==
- Fruitlands Museum
