= Tabitha Babbitt =

American tool maker (1779-1853)

- Born: Sarah Babbitt; December 9, 1779; Hardwick, Massachusetts, United States
- Died: December 10, 1853 (aged 74); Harvard, Massachusetts, United States
- Occupations: Tool maker, inventor
- Parents: Seth Babbitt (father); Elizabeth Babbitt (mother)

Sarah "Tabitha" Babbitt (December 9, 1779 - December 10, 1853) was a Shaker credited as a tool maker and inventor. Inventions attributed to her by the Shakers include the circular saw in lumber milling, an improved spinning wheel head, and a process for manufacturing false teeth. She became a member of the Harvard Shaker community in 1793.

== Personal life ==
Babbitt was born on December 9, 1779, in Hardwick, Massachusetts, the daughter of Seth and Elizabeth Babbitt. On August 12, 1793, aged 13, she became a member of the Shakers at the Harvard Shaker community in Massachusetts. In December 1853, Babbitt died in Harvard, Massachusetts.

== Career ==
=== Toolmaker and inventor ===
Babbitt's was a member of the Harvard, Massachusetts, Shaker community, formally known as the United Society of Believers in Christ’s Second Appearing. The Shakers were a religious sect noted for their communal living, celibacy, and innovations in agriculture, medicine, and technology. Their egalitarian principles allowed women like Babbitt to contribute significantly to practical inventions.

Around 1813, Babbitt reportedly observed the inefficiency of the two-man pit saw, which only cut wood on the forward stroke, wasting energy on the return motion. Inspired by her spinning wheel, she designed a circular saw blade that, once attached to a rotary mechanism, could spin continuously and cut in both directions. She reportedly first implemented her idea by connecting a notched tin disk to her spinning wheel, demonstrating how rotary motion could be used to saw wood more effectively. Though no prototype survives, written Shaker records and oral histories confirm her design spread to local sawmills quickly.

Babbitt did not patent the circular saw, adhering to Shaker beliefs that rejected individual ownership, and innovations were considered communal gifts rather than personal achievements. Despite her lack of formal recognition, her circular saw became widely adopted.

Beyond the circular saw, Babbitt created additional tools to improve efficiency in Shaker workshops. Historical records indicate she modified spinning wheel heads to enhance textile production. She also developed a technique for crafting false teeth, improving their fit and comfort compared to earlier methods.

Babbitt’s work provides documented evidence of women’s contributions to early American technology outside formal scientific institutions. Historical records show she developed practical tools within the shaker community’s workshop setting, addressing specific mechanical challenges. While 19th-century accounts frequently omitted female inventors, modern scholarship has identified Babbitt among the earliest verifiable women innovators in mechanical engineering.

Recent academic research on Shaker technological contributions has brought renewed attention to Babbitt’s work. Archival evidence confirms her status as one of the first documented female inventors in the United States.

== Legacy ==
The inventor Sam Asano cited Babbitt in 2015, alongside Benjamin Franklin, to argue that the National Inventors Hall of Fame inclusion criteria are flawed. The Inventors Hall requires proof of patent and because neither Babbitt nor Franklin filed patents, they are not included in the list.

== See also ==
- Isaac Babbitt, inventor of Babbitt metal alloy for bearings
- Shaker furniture
