= Shadrack Ireland =

American religious leader

- Born: circa 1717 or 1718; Massachusetts
- Died: September 1778; Harvard, Massachusetts
- Occupations: Pipe maker, joiner, carpenter, and religious leader
- Spouse: Martha Mallet
- Children: Martha, Shadrack, Jonathan, Tabitha, Elizabeth, and Margaret
- Parent(s): Abraham and Abigail (Durrant) Ireland

Shadrack Ireland (bapt. 16 January 1718 – died September 1778) was a religious leader in 18th-century America in the wake of the First Great Awakening. He was a disciple of George Whitefield. He taught what is known as Perfectionism, meaning that he and certain of his followers had achieved perfection in their lifetime. Ireland was the child of Abraham and Abigail (Durrant) Ireland and he was baptized in Cambridge, Massachusetts on 16 January 1718. As an adult, Ireland was a pipe maker from Charlestown, Massachusetts, where he had a wife, Martha (or Elizabeth), and six children.

== Perfectionist beliefs ==
In the 1750s, Shadrack Ireland experienced a change in his "mind and body" that he believed resulted in his becoming "perfect and immortal". Ireland left his wife and family and moved to Grafton, Massachusetts, where he took a "spiritual wife"—Mrs. Sarah Prentice, the wife of the Reverend Solomon Prentice. Ireland preached abstinence except for those who had reached perfection. Since their bodies were free of sin, they could take spiritual wives and husbands (even if they were legally married to someone else). Being under the threat from authorities for his behavior, Ireland moved to the north part of the town of Harvard, Massachusetts. In 1769, he and eight followers built a house now known as "The Square House". The Shakers who later lived there believed that Ireland himself had carved the banister and railings that lead to the second floor. While living at Harvard, Ireland also had a spiritual wife, the "widow Logy".

== Immortality and death ==
As a Perfectionist, Ireland claimed that he would not truly die but would be resurrected. He ordered his followers not to bury him when he died, but to await his resurrection. The circumstances of his death in September 1778 were recorded by a former follower, Isaac Holden. Holden learned the details when he went to visit the Square House, not knowing that Ireland had died. The evening of his death, Ireland appeared changed but calm and serene. He washed himself as usual, and said to Mrs. Cooper and Sister Nabby, that "the Lord hath down with me and I have completed all the work he sent me to do but don't be [hurt] for I am a [going] but don't bury me for the time is very short God is coming to take the church." Ireland then went upstairs, knelt under a window, and prayed for the "hundred & fiftifour thousand" concluding by saying, "father I am but [past] do thy will". He then lay down on the bed and died.

Ireland's body was left as he had ordered until the smell became so bad that he was put into a long white box in a corner of the cellar and covered with lime. His body remained there until July 1779, when his followers, David Hoar and Abijah Worster, buried him in an unmarked grave in a cornfield. David Hoar then led the group for a while.

Many of Shadrack Ireland's followers were converted to Shakerism by Mother Ann Lee, who then took over the Square House. Ann Lee later anathemized Ireland and sometimes referred to his presence as an "evil spirit". At one time, she even claimed to have banished him to hell.
