= Still River Baptist Church =

Historic church in Massachusetts, United States

- U.S. National Register of Historic Places
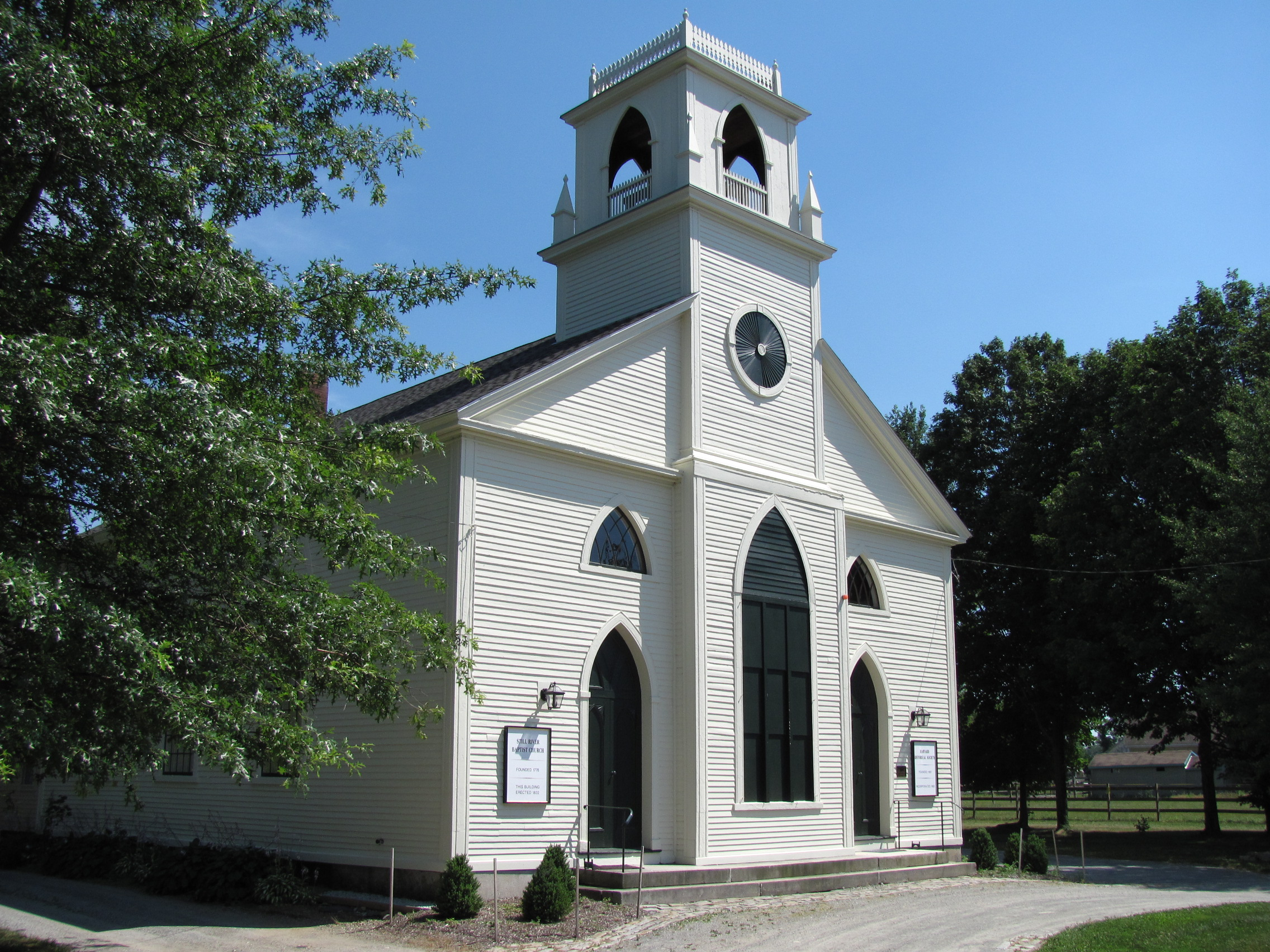
- Still River Baptist Church

- Location within Massachusetts Location within the United States
- Location: Harvard, Massachusetts
- Coordinates: 42°29′29″N 71°37′4″W
- Built: 1832
- Architectural style: Gothic Revival
- NRHP reference No.: 96001479
- Added to NRHP: December 13, 1996

Still River Baptist Church (also known as the Still River Meetinghouse) is the home of the Harvard Historical Society. It is an historic Gothic Revival-style meeting house located at 213 Still River Road in Harvard, Massachusetts. The building houses the Harvard Historical Society's museum and archival collections.

== History ==
In 1832, the Still River Baptist Society built the current Still River Baptist Meeting House to use for weekly worship services. The Baptist Society was founded on 27 June 1776. The first building on this site was purchased from the town of Leominster, Massachusetts, where it had served as the Standing Order (Congregational) church. When the current meeting house was built, the Baptist Society moved their first building across the street (218 Still River Road) to serve as a parsonage. Although it burned down in 1910, a photograph showing the original building is in the possession of the Harvard Historical Society.

The Still River Baptist Church was an active congregation through the nineteenth century and its members founded numerous other churches in the region. In 1966, the Still River Baptist Society merged with Harvard's "Evangelical Congregational Church" and sold its meetinghouse to the Harvard Historical Society. Briefly, an Episcopalian congregation rented the building to use for worship services.

The present 1832 building houses a steeple bell believed to have been originally from the Congregational Church, a baptismal font built into the stage, and an 1870 Stevens & Company organ. The organ has been awarded an Organ Historical Society citation honoring its historic qualities. The Harvard Historical Society is restoring the organ.

=== Church Society ===
On June 27, 1776, fourteen individuals signed the covenant that established a Baptist church in Harvard. They were Jemima Blanchard, Huldah Edes, Elizabeth Gates, Stephen Gates, Ruth Kilburn, Sarah Kilburn, Doctor Isaiah Parker, Joseph Stone, Annis Willard, Josiah Willard, Rachel Willard, Sarah Willard, Tarbel Willard, and William Willard Jr. The church's first minister, the Reverend Isaiah Parker MD, was ordained on 10 June 1778 by the Reverend Samuel Stillman DD.

During its early years, this church represented a dissenting denomination in Harvard—in marked contrast to the town-supported Standing Order church. However, some Baptist members sat on town committees and were sent to the State House. Co-founder Deacon Joseph Stone represented Harvard as a state senator, and the Reverend Isaiah Parker was a one-time member of the House of Representatives.

Some early church records are held in the Harvard Historical Society's collections. The church was a member of the Warren (Baptist) Association, an intrastate organization that supported individual churches in their struggle to separate church and state. Yearly association letters written by the Reverend Parker and others are in the Isaac Backus Collection at the Andover Newton Theological School. Statistical information on the early church's membership taken from these letters was published in the yearly Warren Association Minutes.

=== Harvard Historical Society ===
The Harvard Historical Society was founded in 1897 and currently operates a museum and archives in the building. The Harvard Historical Society sponsors educational events for local students and the public, and periodically publishes historical tracts. The meeting house was added to the National Register of Historic Places in 1996. The Society's office is normally open to the public Monday and Tuesday afternoons from 1 to 5 pm and by appointment.

== Historical Society Publications ==
- History of Harvard, 1894-1941 compiled by Ida Harris
- Directions of a Town (1977) compiled by Robert Anderson
- The Harvard Album (1997) in memory of Elvira Scorgie

== See also ==
- National Register of Historic Places listings in Worcester County, Massachusetts
