= Charles Lane (transcendentalist) =

English-American transcendentalist, abolitionist, and voluntaryist (1800–1870)

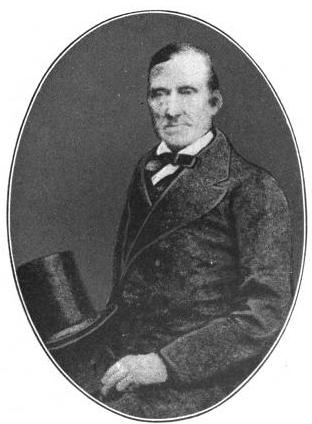
- Born: 1800; Hackney parish
- Died: 1870 (aged 69–70)
- Occupations: Transcendentalist, writer

Charles Lane (31 March 1800 – 5 January 1870) was an English-American transcendentalist, abolitionist, and early voluntaryist. Along with Amos Bronson Alcott, he was one of the main founders of Fruitlands and a vegan.

== Early life ==
Lane was born in Hackney, then east of London, and edited a financial publication, The London Merchant Current. He was a disciple of James Pierrepont Greaves, a member of Alcott House at Ham Common in Surrey, and a contributor to The Dial.

== Fruitlands ==
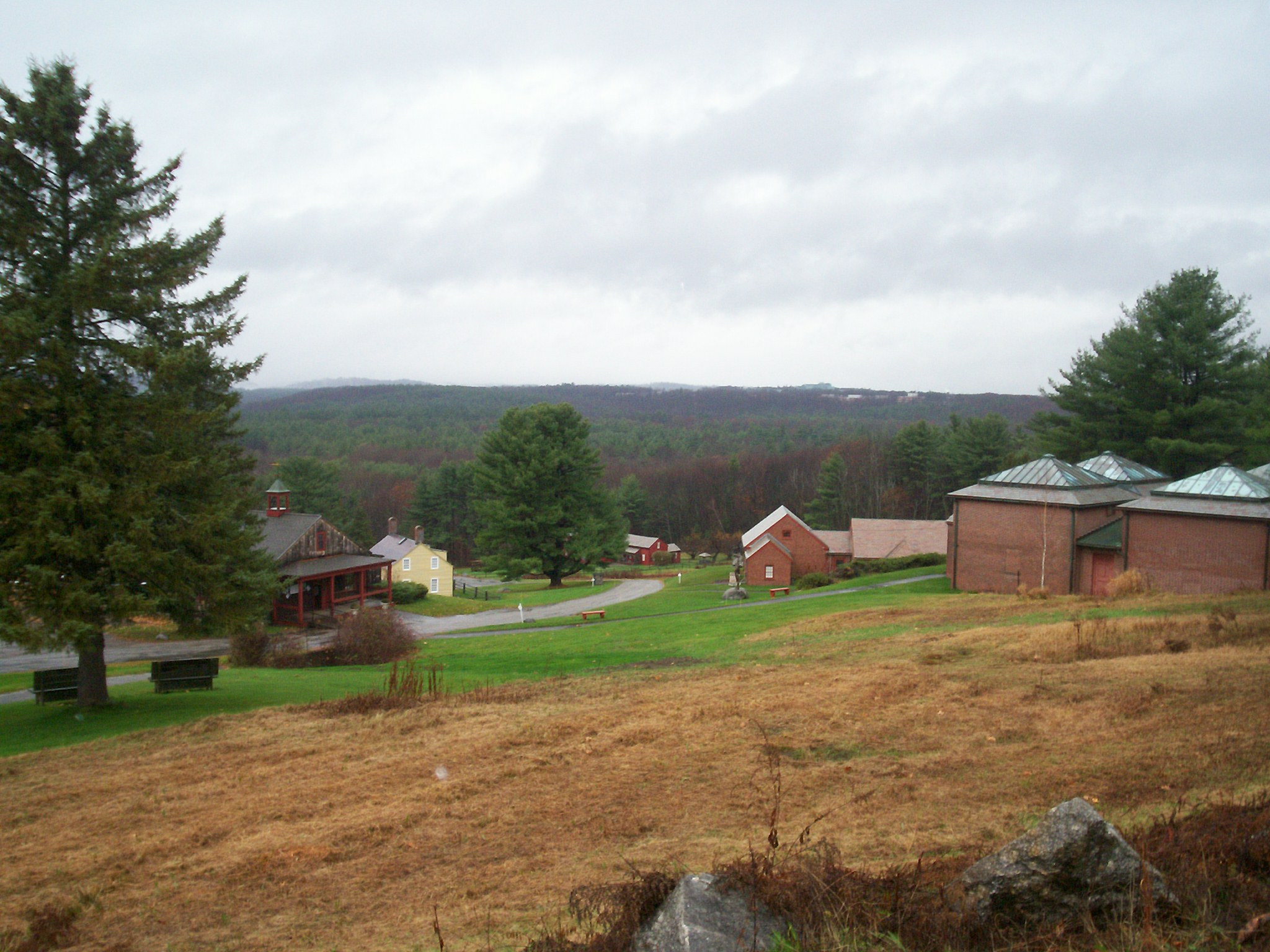
Fruitlands in 2008, now a museum complex

Lane was an admirer of Bronson Alcott, for whom Alcott House had been named. The two met in 1842, when Alcott had traveled to England to enlist support and people for his experiment in communal living. Lane offered his support and returned to the United States with Alcott on October 21, 1842. The next May, Lane purchased the 90-acre (360,000 m^{2}) Wyman Farm in Harvard, Massachusetts, for $1800 (~$43,234 in 2025). They had moved to the farm on June 1 and optimistically gave it the name "Fruitlands", despite there being only ten old apple trees on the property. A month later, Alcott announced the community in The Dial: "We have made an arrangement with the proprietor of an estate of about a hundred acres, which liberates this tract from human ownership".

In principle, the Fruitlands reformers did not believe in purchasing property; Lane said the following on the subject: "We do not recognize the purchase of land; but its redemption from the debasing state of proprium, or property, to divine uses, we clearly understand; where those whom the world esteems owners are found yielding their individual rights to the Supreme Owner." The commune attracted 14 residents, including the Alcott and Lane families.

"The consociate family", as Fruitlands residents referred to themselves, wished to achieve complete freedom by separating entirely from the world economy. To accomplish this, they refrained from trade, allowed no personal property, and did not use hired labor. They intended to grow all their own food; they also eliminated animal products from their diets entirely. Referring to their vegan diet, Lane wrote, "Neither coffee, tea, molasses, nor rice tempts us beyond the bounds of indigenous production... No animal substances neither flesh, butter, cheese, eggs, nor milk pollute our tables, nor corrupt our bodies." Diet was usually fruit and water; many vegetables—including carrots, beets, and potatoes—were forbidden because they showed a lower nature by growing downward. Lane and Alcott also asked participants to wear only linen clothes and canvas shoes; cotton fabric was forbidden because it exploited slave labor and wool was banned because it came from sheep. As they believed that animals should not be exploited, Fruitlands would not use animals though, eventually, they allowed an ox and a cow.

The land that Lane purchased for Fruitlands proved to be not sufficiently arable. Fruitlands ultimately failed the winter after it opened, largely due to food shortages and accompanying unrest in the inhabitants. Lane blamed the community's failure on Alcott, who he believed misled him with his optimism. Alcott and Lane also disagreed on definitions of the consociate family. Lane believed in the renunciation of marriage in exchange for a universal or communal family.

== Shakers ==
In January 1844, Lane left Fruitlands with his son to join a local community of Shakers. Lane admired the Shaker commitment to celibacy and it was one of the points that drew him there. Lane continued his work and joined the Shaker community; but could not settle there. He attempted another communal venture at Red Bank, New Jersey. He was only there for a short time. In 1846 he returned to England, remarried, and fathered five children.

== Voluntaryist leanings ==
Charles Lane was probably the most consistent voluntaryist of the abolitionist era. He was friendly with Amos Bronson Alcott, Ralph Waldo Emerson, and Thoreau. Between January and June 1843 a series of nine letters he penned were published in such abolitionist's papers as The Liberator and The Herald of Freedom. The title under which they were published was "A Voluntary Political Government," and in them Lane described the state in terms of institutionalized violence and referred to its "club law, its mere brigand right of a strong arm, [supported] by guns and bayonets." He saw the coercive state on par with "forced" Christianity. "Everyone can see that the church is wrong when it comes to men with the [B]ible in one hand, and the sword in the other." "Is it not equally diabolical for the state to do so?" Lane believed that governmental rule was only tolerated by public opinion because the fact was not yet recognized that all the true purposes of the state could be carried out on the voluntary principle, just as churches could be sustained voluntarily. Reliance on the voluntary principle could only come about through "kind, orderly, and moral means" that were consistent with the totally voluntary society he was advocating. "Let us have a voluntary State as well as a voluntary Church, and we may possibly then have some claim to the appellation of free men."

== Death ==
Lane died on 11 January 1870, eleven weeks before his 70th birthday. His grave is in Hook Churchyard.

== Selected publications ==
- A Classification of Sciences and Arts, Or, A Map of Human Knowledge, 1826
- A Dictionary, English and Burmese, 1841
- A Voluntary Political Government, 1843
- Life in the Woods, 1844
- Brook Farm, 1844

== See also ==
- American philosophy
- List of American philosophers
