= Orange County Newschannel =

Regional cable news network (1990–2001)

- Country: United States
- Broadcast area: Orange County, California

Programming
- Language: American English
- Picture format: 4:3 standard definition

Ownership
- Owner: Freedom Communications (1990-1996); Century Communications (1996-1999); Adelphia (1999-2001)

History
- Launched: September 1, 1990; 36 years ago
- Closed: September 7, 2001; 24 years ago

The Orange County Newschannel (often branded as OC Newschannel and OCN) was a regional cable news network pioneering a rolling news format, serving Orange County, California south of the Greater Los Angeles area. The channel also pioneered the producer - presenter work format where the reporters self-produced television news items using the then emerging light weight cameras and video digitising ingestion systems based on Apple Computer and Oracle Database software.

Technically a network because it was carried by multiple cable operators then in business in Orange County, OCN, launched in 1990 by Freedom Communications, was among the earliest regional 24-hour cable news cable television channels (the first being the Cablevision-owned News 12 Networks, which all launched in December 1986). As early as 1992, OCN began producing news for KTLA (which would eventually attempt to rival the cable channel in its home county). Freedom sold OCN to New Canaan, Connecticut-based Century Communications, which at the time operated other cable entities in California, most notably in Beverly Hills and Los Angeles, in 1996.

The network was purchased by Adelphia Cable in 1999 (eventually the name was changed slightly to Orange County News Channel) and struggled with decreasing profits and ad revenue and ended up going out of business on September 7, 2001 after years of losing money in which the network ended up going bankrupt. Throughout its life, OCN had a largely captive audience, as the only other sources for cable news in Orange County were KTLA and KOCE-TV.

OCN's website continued to operate as an internet-only news portal for Orange County, offering daily news to subscribers. Several members of the news staff that had worked at OCN eventually found a new home at KOCE-TV's news desk.

The network was a founding member of the Association of Regional News Channels.

In 2007, the similarly named and formatted OC Channel began, run by KOCE and Chapman University.
