= LA Plaza de Cultura y Artes =

Mexican-American museum and cultural center in Los Angeles, California

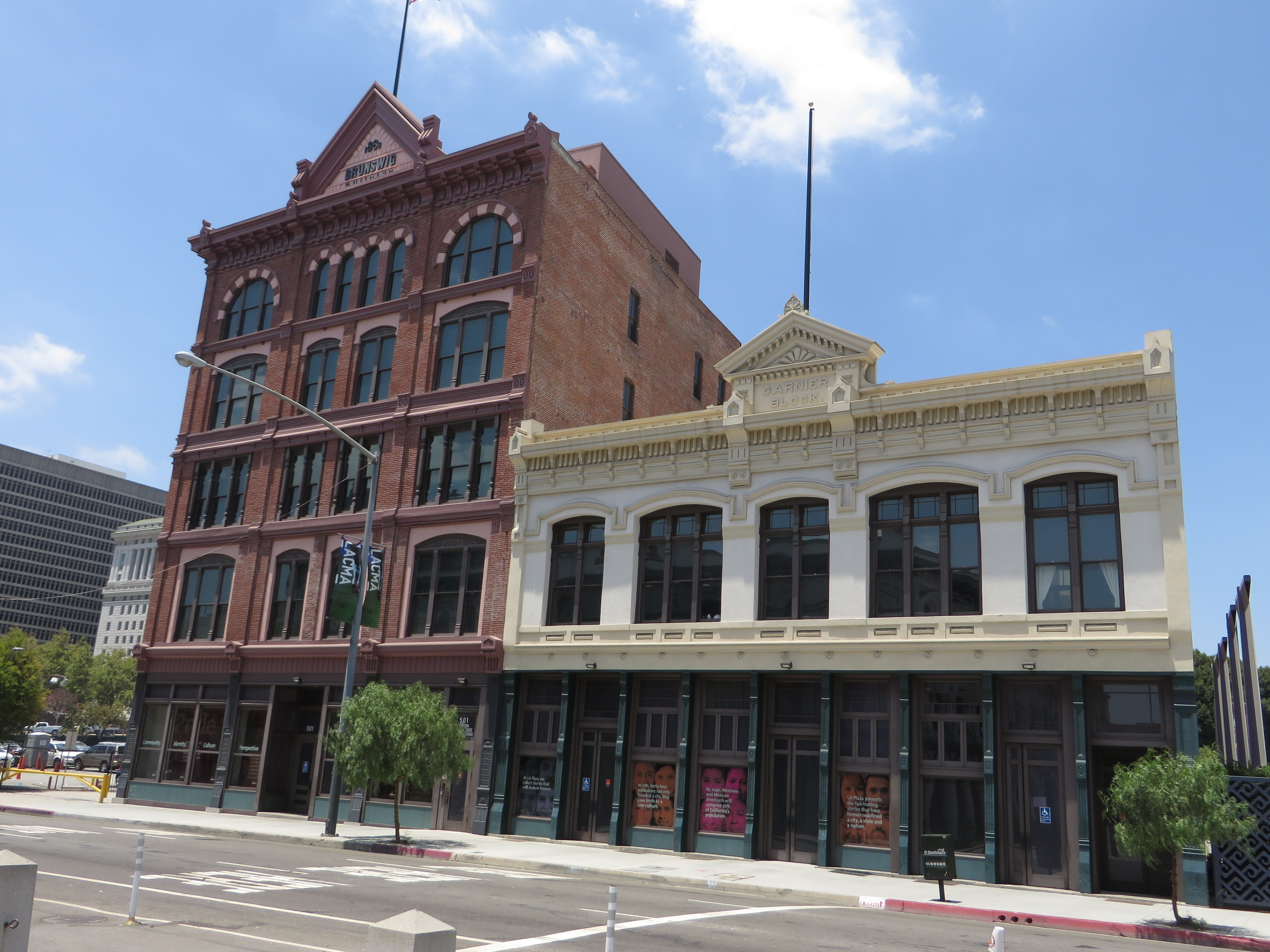
- Plaza House and Vickrey-Brunswig Building.
- Established: April 2011
- Location: 501 North Main Street
- Coordinates: 34.056164°N 118.240008°W
- Public transit access: Union Station
- Website: lapca.org

LA Plaza de Cultura y Artes, also called LA Plaza, is a Mexican-American museum and cultural center in Los Angeles, California, USA that opened in April 2011. Housed in two historic buildings in downtown Los Angeles it includes a museum, a 30,000-square-foot outdoor space with a performance stage, an edible garden, and LA Cocina de Gloria Molina, a teaching kitchen and flexible event space.

Through its two permanent exhibitions L.A. Starts Here! and Calle Principal: Mi México en Los Ángeles, along with rotating displays in two temporary galleries, LA Plaza’s exhibitions engage in an ongoing dialogue with the past, present, and future of Los Angeles.

L.A. Starts Here! presents an alternative to traditional interpretations of Los Angeles history, aiming to change what the public knows about Mexicans and Mexican Americans in the city.

The renovation, expected to take three years to complete at a total cost of $5 million, will incorporate stories from Central and South America as well as Indigenous communities. The project will enhance access to research and information, foster greater community engagement, and introduce state-of-the-art interactive audiovisual technology, creating a more inclusive and welcoming experience for visitors.

Calle Principal: Mi México en Los Ángeles is a reconstruction of 1920s Main Street and was designed by experienced design expert Tali Krakowsky.

LA Plaza programming shares the history, cultures, values, and traditions of Mexicans and Mexican Americans in Los Angeles and Southern California. It includes a series of salsa concerts, book talks, family days, poetry readings, dance performances, film screenings, workshops, tours and panel discussions. LA Plaza's public programs amplify several voices and identities, including Chicano, Afro-Latino, LGBTQIA+ and more.

Through LA Cocina de Gloria Molina, a teaching kitchen and flexible event space that spotlights the history, culture, and influence of Mexican and Mexican American cuisine, LA Plaza offers culturally rooted cooking classes, talks, tastings, and cooking demonstrations. The Culinary Youth Training Program provides free, bilingual workforce development and skill-building opportunities to young people ages 16-24.

The museum is near Olvera Street in the El Pueblo de Los Angeles Historic District, also called El Pueblo. It is next to La Iglesia de Nuestra Señora Reina de los Angeles, also called La Placita or Plaza Church. The buildings are from the 1880s, some of the oldest in the city, the Vickrey-Brunswig Building and the Plaza House (1883).

It is owned by Los Angeles County which also owns Los Angeles County Museum of Art and others. For a time after its founding, LA Plaza struggled with financial problems; donations and grants were expected to surpass $3.5 million in 2017.

On 2019, LA Plaza re-opened LA Plaza Paseo Walkway after extensive renovations and upgrades. The landscaped, block-long pathway between the LA Plaza museum and the historic La Placita Church, extending from Main Street to Spring Street, now includes historical signage about the city’s past, from the indigenous Gabrielino-Tongva settlers through the years ruled by Spain, Mexico and the United States. Construction of this phase of the Paseo Walkway was funded by the Los Angeles County Parks and Open Space District (Prop A), LA Plaza, and Trammell Crow.

The Walkway creates a direct pedestrian pathway stretching approximately four city blocks connecting Union Station and the new LA Plaza Village residential.

This walkway has been used to display large outdoor sculptures. From 2019 to 2023, it had on display Transportapueblos, Companion of Migrants, one of a series of wooden coyotes sculptures by Mexican artist Alfredo Gutierrez that shared helpful information and needed supplies such as water and maps to help migrants traveling.

For four years, LA Plaza de Cultura y Artes Walkway had on displayed a section of the Berlin Wall. In August 2023, this historic piece was relocated to La Plaza de la Amistad in Playas de Tijuana, near the US-Mexico border wall that symbolizes the division between Mexico and the United States.

== History ==
=== Construction ===
County Supervisor Gloria Molina was called "one of the project's earliest supporters and, by all accounts, the person most responsible for bringing it to fruition" by the Los Angeles Times. Part of the cost was funded by Molina's county discretionary spending funds. The center is on 2.2 acres (0.89 ha), with a price tag of $54 million and an operating budget of $850,000. It was designed by Chu+Gooding Architects.

The rehabilitation of the shell and core of the historic Plaza House and Vickrey-Brunswig Building was completed in December 2009. The LA Plaza de Cultura y Artes Foundation completed tenant improvements to the two buildings and relocated their administrative offices to the fifth floor of the Vickrey-Brunswig Building in October 2010.

In October 2010, human remains were discovered from an old cemetery during excavations for an outdoor garden walkway and fountain. 118 bodies were removed before community concerns about the possible Native American origin of the remains and poor archaeological handling halted the construction in January 2011. Referring to an Environmental Impact Report conducted by Sapphos Environmental, Gloria Molina said "Had they done better work, we wouldn't be in this situation." Remains were taken to the Los Angeles County Museum of Natural History.

=== Operation ===
A $135-million development of 341 apartments with shops and community facilities near the cultural center provides funding for nonprofit foundation that runs LA Plaza de Cultura y Artes. The project was approved in 2014 along with a deal with the county Board of Supervisors to lease the parcel to the foundation for a dollar who then sublets it to the developer. The site had two public parking lots so the county no longer gets that income but does get property tax revenues from the development.

The project includes a pedestrian oriented arcade facing Spring Street that incorporates prominent access to the LA Plaza Paseo, which connects the parcels to LA Plaza and Union Station. The layout facilitates pedestrian access to Fort Moore and Grand Park on Hill Street. With this project, the revitalization of downtown Los Angeles appears to be reaching the area around Union Station and Olvera Street.
