= Edewor =

- Gender: Unisex
- Language: Isoko

Origin
- Language: Delta State
- Origin: Southern Nigeria
- Meaning: Sacred day of worship

Edeworaudio is a Nigerian name of Isoko origin. It means "Sacred day of worship". The name Edewor Aligns with the belief and tradition of the Isoko people. People with this name are those given birth to on the sacred day of worship.

== Notable people ==
- Eku Edewor, British Nigerian actress
- Lola Abiola-Edewor, Nigerian politician
- Jonathan Edewor, Bishop of the Anglican Diocese of Oleh
