= Stephanie Thomas =

Stephanie Thomas may refer to:

- Stephanie Thomas (fashion designer)
- Stephanie Thomas (politician)
