= KBAB =

KBAB may refer to:

- KBAB-LD, a television rebroadcaster (channel 31, virtual 50) licensed to serve Santa Barbara, California, United States
- Beale Air Force Base (ICAO code KBAB)
