= Edward R. Roybal Learning Center =

Public school in Los Angeles, California

Coordinates: 34°3′39″N 118°15′16″W

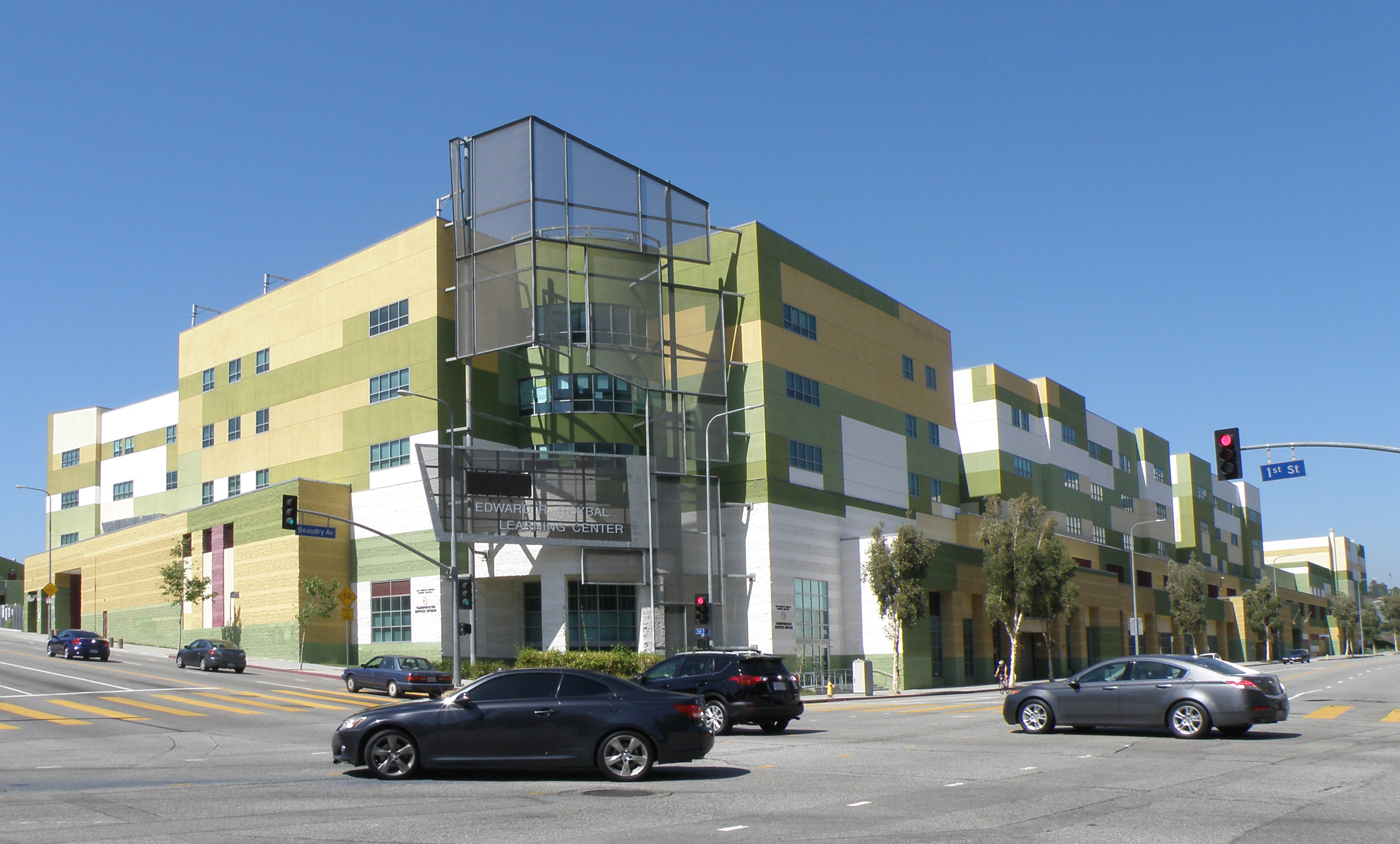

Location
- 1200 West Colton St; Los Angeles, California 90026

Information
- Type: Public
- Motto: "Once a Titan, Always a Titan!"
- Established: September 3, 2008
- Locale: City, Large
- School district: LAUSD
- NCES District ID: 0622710
- NCES School ID: 062271012295
- Principal: Blanca Cruz
- Teaching staff: 56.03 (on an FTE basis)
- Grades: 9–12
- Enrollment: 1,130 (2024–25)
  - Male: 626
  - Female: 504
- Student to teacher ratio: 20.17
- Color: Maroon
- Mascot: Titans
- Website: Official Website

Edward R. Roybal Learning Center (formerly known as Belmont Learning Center, Vista Hermosa Learning Center, and Central Los Angeles High School 11) is a secondary school located in the Westlake area of Los Angeles, California. Built to alleviate overcrowding at the nearby Belmont High School, the school's construction was met with controversy surrounding its cost and the discoveries of harmful gases and an earthquake fault, leading to a temporary suspension in 1999 that wasn't lifted until 2003. While development began in 1988, the school did not open until 20 years later on September 3, 2008.

== History ==
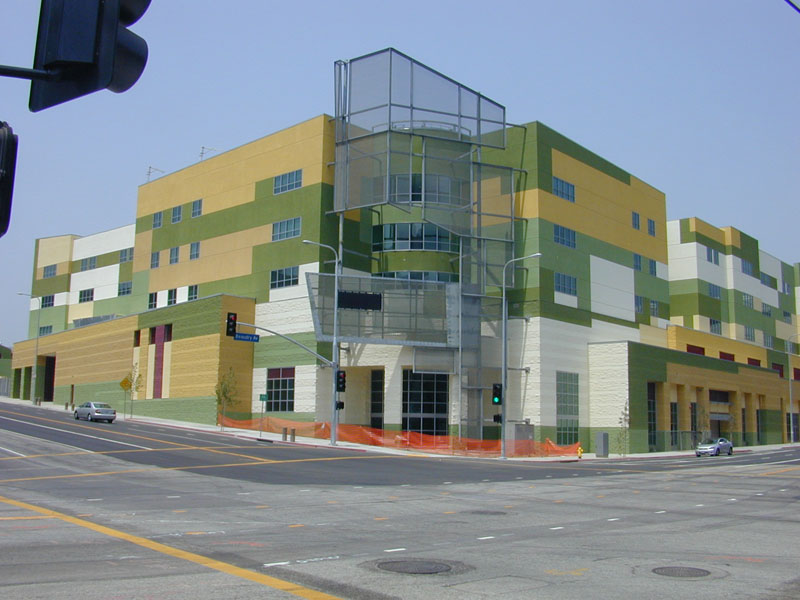
Roybal Learning Center before its opening in May 2008.

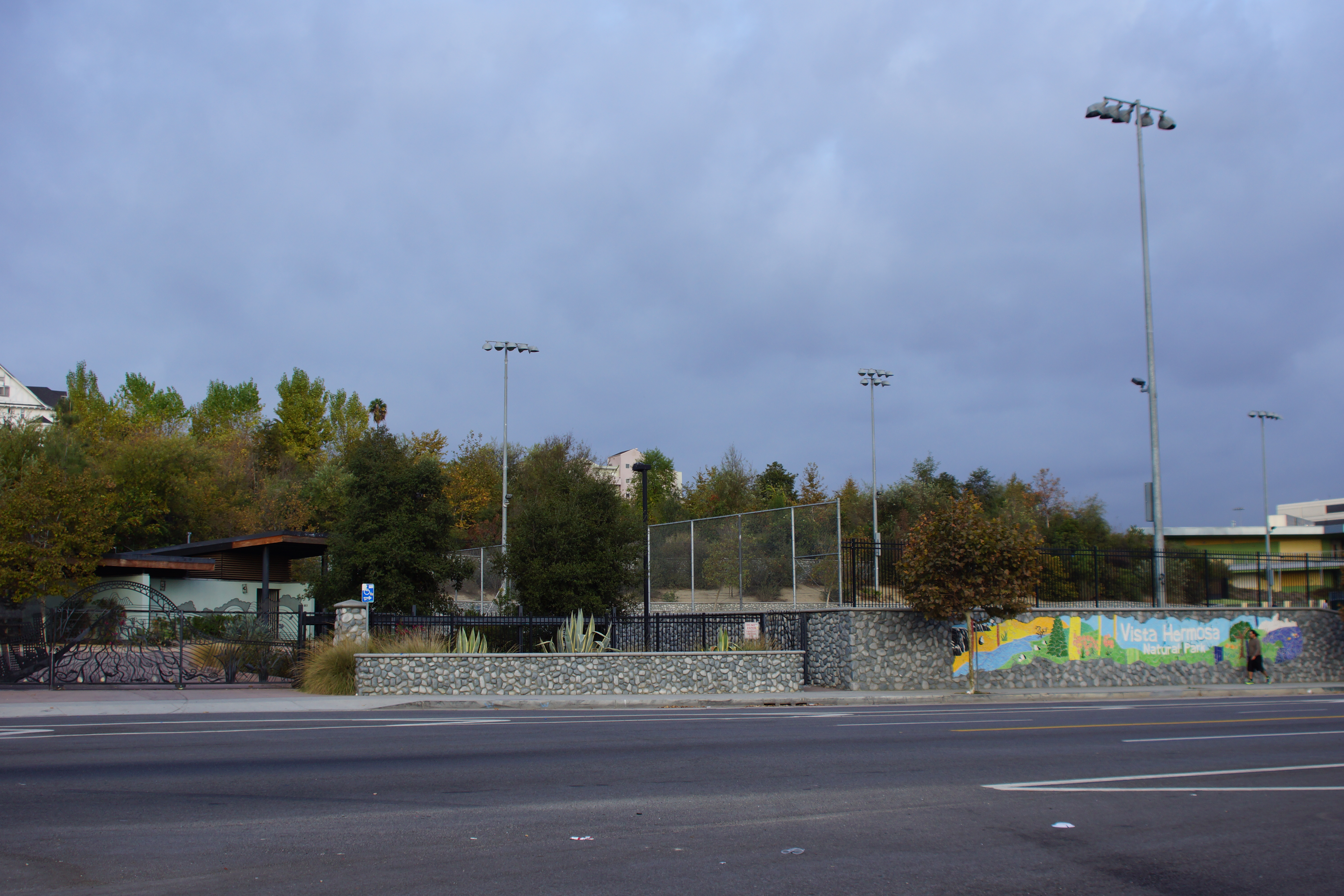
The Vista Hermosa Natural Park, which is connected to the school, in 2013.

Early planning and construction of a new school called the Belmont Learning Center began in 1988 as an effort to reduce overcrowding at the nearby Belmont High School, with some of the land previously used for the Los Angeles City Oil Field. The school received some pushback due to the cost and how it would be financed. It was designed by McLarand Vasquez & Partners, with the construction beginning in 1997. However, this was halted in 1999 after tests revealed methane and hydrogen sulfide gases within the land, stemming from the oil field. Two years later, with the construction stalled, it was revealed that the land was also situated on a major earthquake fault.

After the project was temporarily suspended in 2002, WWCOT took over from McLarand Vasquez & Partners in 2003 with the backing of new Superintendent Roy Romer and the LAUSD Board of Education. In 2004, more than half of the buildings were demolished in light of the earthquake fault. Construction was restarted in 2006, necessitating the demolition of some of the already completed classroom buildings and administration building. The total cost for the school was estimated to be around $400 million.

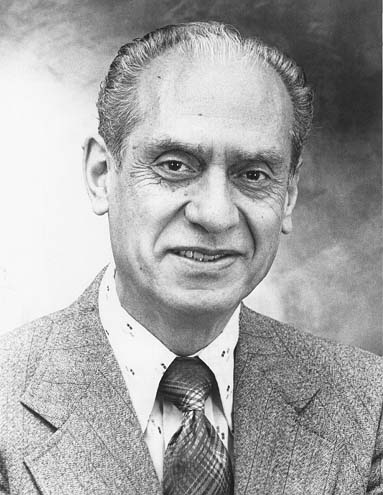
Edward R. Roybal (1916–2005), whom the school was renamed after in 2008.

On March 25, 2008, the LAUSD Board of Education voted to rename the Vista Hermosa Learning Center to the Edward R. Roybal Learning Center, honoring former city councilman and Congressman Edward R. Roybal, who represented the area where the school is situated. On July 19, 2008, Vista Hermosa Park opened its doors before the fall opening of Roybal Learning Center, with an opening-day celebration that featured Mayor Antonio Villaraigosa and Supervisor Gloria Molina. On September 3, 2008, Roybal Learning Center opened for 2,400 students, with a ribbon-cutting ceremony held the day before.

== Academics and programs ==
The Roybal Learning Center opened with four small learning communities—the International School of Languages (ISL), the Activists for Educational Empowerment (AEE), the Business and Finance Academy (BFA), and the Computer Science Academy (CSA)—as well as two independent pilot schools—Civitas School of Leadership and the School for Visual Arts and Humanities. The school later replaced ISL with the Academy for Social Work and Child Development (SWCD) and renamed the Activists for Educational Empowerment to Academy of Educational Empowerment. Each Academy has its own purpose and different techniques of teaching: BFA is more about involving students with the business atmosphere; SWCD trains students for jobs in the fields of social work and child development; CSA is about involving students with the computer atmosphere; and AEE provides their students with a sense of empowerment and helps them get involved.

In 2021, a new magnet school called the Roybal School of Film and Television Production opened on campus, with the support of high-profile celebrities such as George Clooney, Mindy Kaling, Kerry Washington, Eva Longoria and Don Cheadle.

== Schools housed alongside Roybal ==
=== Current schools ===
- Downtown Magnets High School (2022–present)
- Roybal School of Film and Television Production Magnet (2022–present)

=== Former schools ===
- Civitas School of Leadership (2008–2014)
- School for the Visual Arts and Humanities (2008–2010)
- Los Angeles Academy of Art and Enterprise (2016–2021)

== Bibliography ==
- Endres B (1999) An evaluation of the oil and gas migration hazards existing at the Belmont Learning Center Complex, Belmont Blue Ribbon Commission Hearings, October 1999
