= Woodbury University =

Private university in Burbank, California, US

Coordinates: 34.20850°N 118.34155°W

- Former names: Woodbury College; Woodbury's Business College; Woodbury University
- Type: Private university
- Active: July 7, 1884–July 6, 2026
- Founder: Francis C. Woodbury
- Accreditation: WSCUC
- Location: Burbank, California, United States
- Campus: 22.4 acres (9.1 ha); Suburban
- Colors: Purple and white
- Website: woodbury.edu

Woodbury University was a private university in Burbank, California, United States. Founded in 1884 with initial campuses in Downtown and Central Los Angeles, Woodbury was one of the oldest institutions of higher education in Southern California. The university consisted of three schools: the Woodbury Business Institute, the Center for Interdisciplinary Studies, the and the College of Architecture, Design and Media. In December 2023, the University of Redlands announced its intent to merge with Woodbury, with acquisition being finalized on June 4, 2024. The merger and integration was completed following approval from the U.S. Department of Education on July 6, 2026.

== History ==
=== 1884–1937: Foundation ===
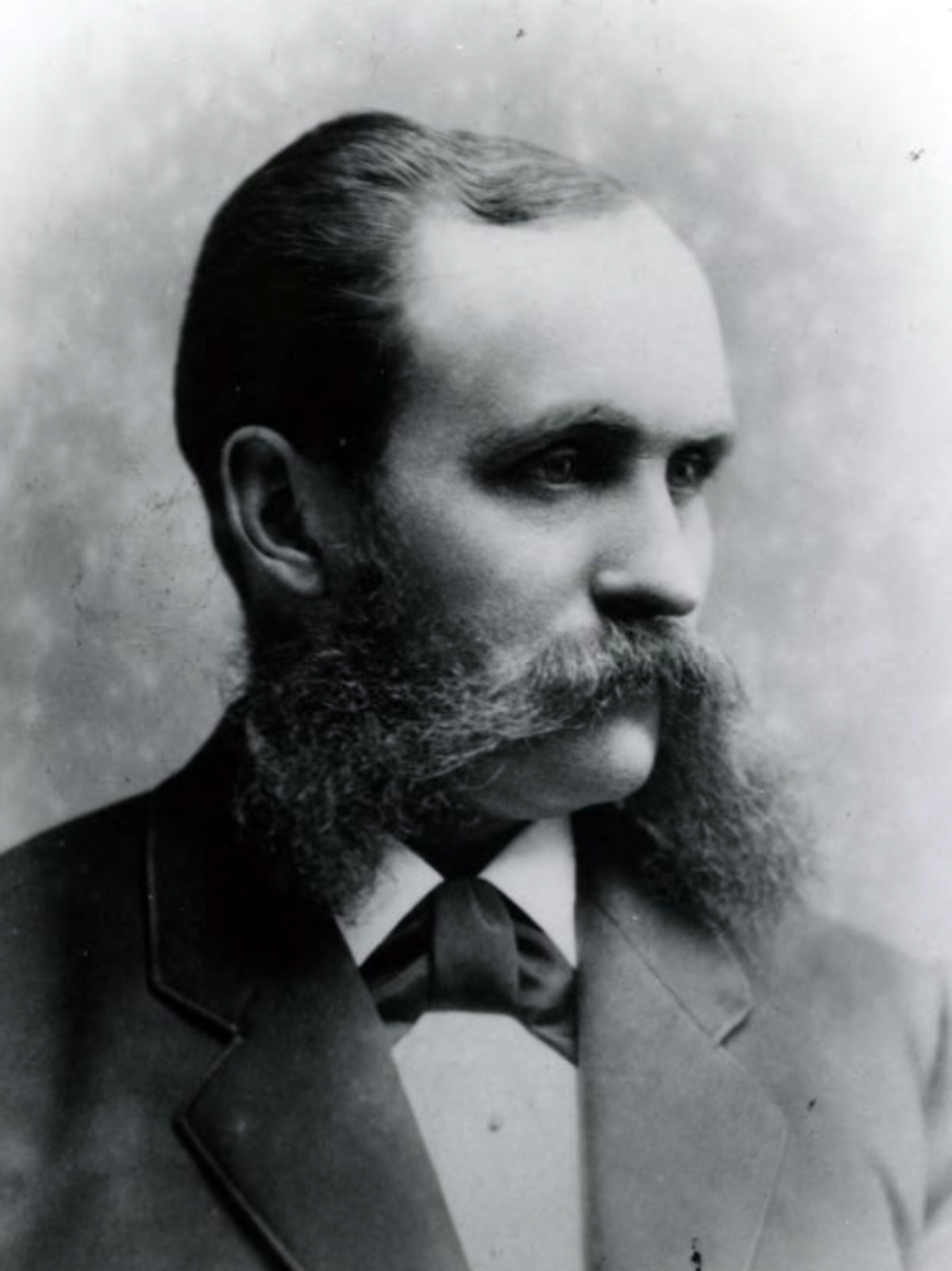
Francis C. Woodbury, the founder and namesake of the university

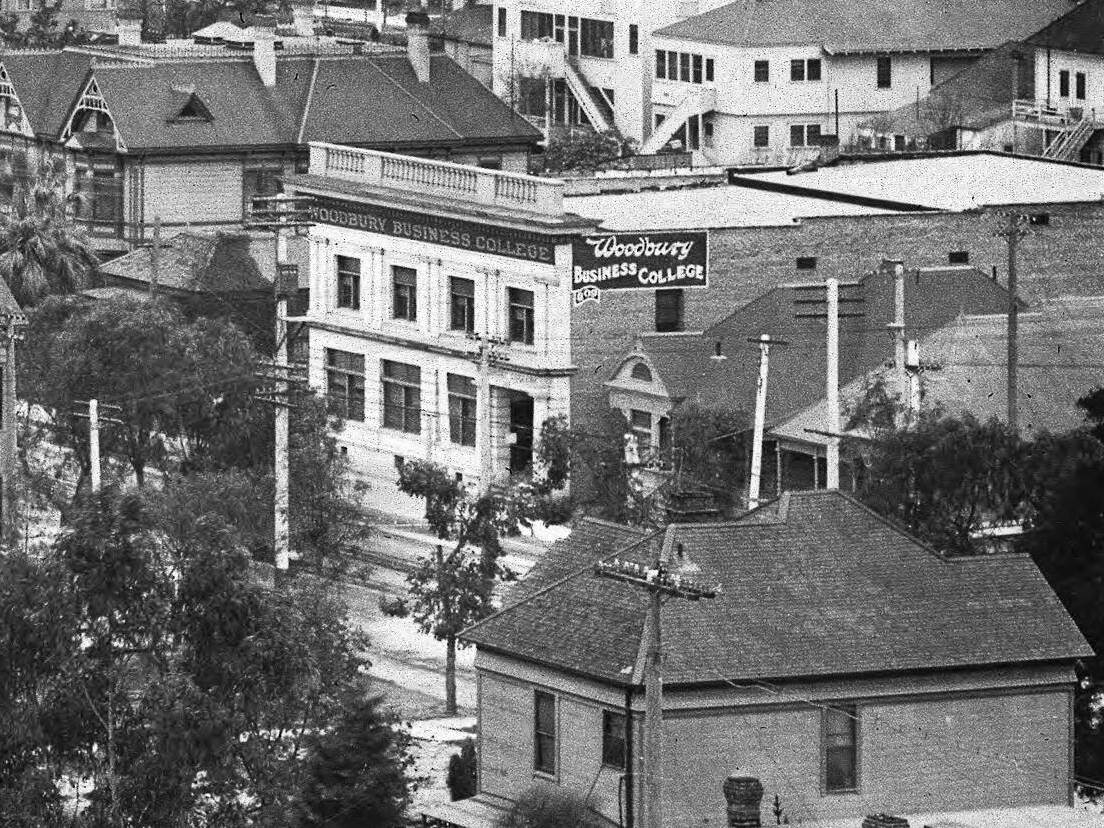
Woodbury Business College, c. 1905

University of Redlands, Los Angeles was founded as Woodbury's Business College on July 7, 1884, by Francis C. Woodbury, who was formerly a partner in Heald's Business College in San Francisco. The school started operations on July 19, 1884, focusing on educating Los Angeles residents in the areas of business, including bookkeeping, commercial law, and telegraphy. Its inaugural class comprised equal numbers of male and female students.

In the first 103 years of the university's existence, the campus was located in Downtown and Central Los Angeles. The first Los Angeles campus was at 316 North Main Street in Downtown Los Angeles, moving to the Stowell Building at 226 South Spring Street. In 1924, Woodbury received a charter status, expanding the curriculum to include more business courses including business administration, foreign trade, and other marketing courses. In 1931, a division of professional arts was established to focus on fields of design that were close to business, including commercial art, interior design, and fashion design.

=== 1937–1987: Name change and accreditation ===
In 1937, Woodbury moved to its final Central Los Angeles campus located at 1027 Wilshire Boulevard in the Westlake district under the presidency of R. H. Whitten. The campus was a Streamline Moderne building designed by Claud Beelman, and was constructed in order to help with the growing student body. Beelman was posthumously awarded an Honorary Doctorate of Architecture on May 12, 2023 in Burbank, California.

In 1969, Woodbury introduced a graduate program leading to a Master of Business Administration degree. In 1974, Woodbury College changed its name to become Woodbury University, and by the early 1980s, added the majors of computer information systems and architecture. In 1982, Computer Information Systems was added as a major, followed in 1984 by Architecture. In 1987, the Weekend College program for working adults was established with the aid of grants from The Fletcher Jones Foundation and The William Randolph Hearst Foundation. In September 1985, the university announced their plans to relocate their campus in the next year after purchasing the site of the former Villa Cabrini Academy. Woodbury officially moved into the campus in 1987.

=== 1987–2026: Move to Burbank and University of Redlands merger ===
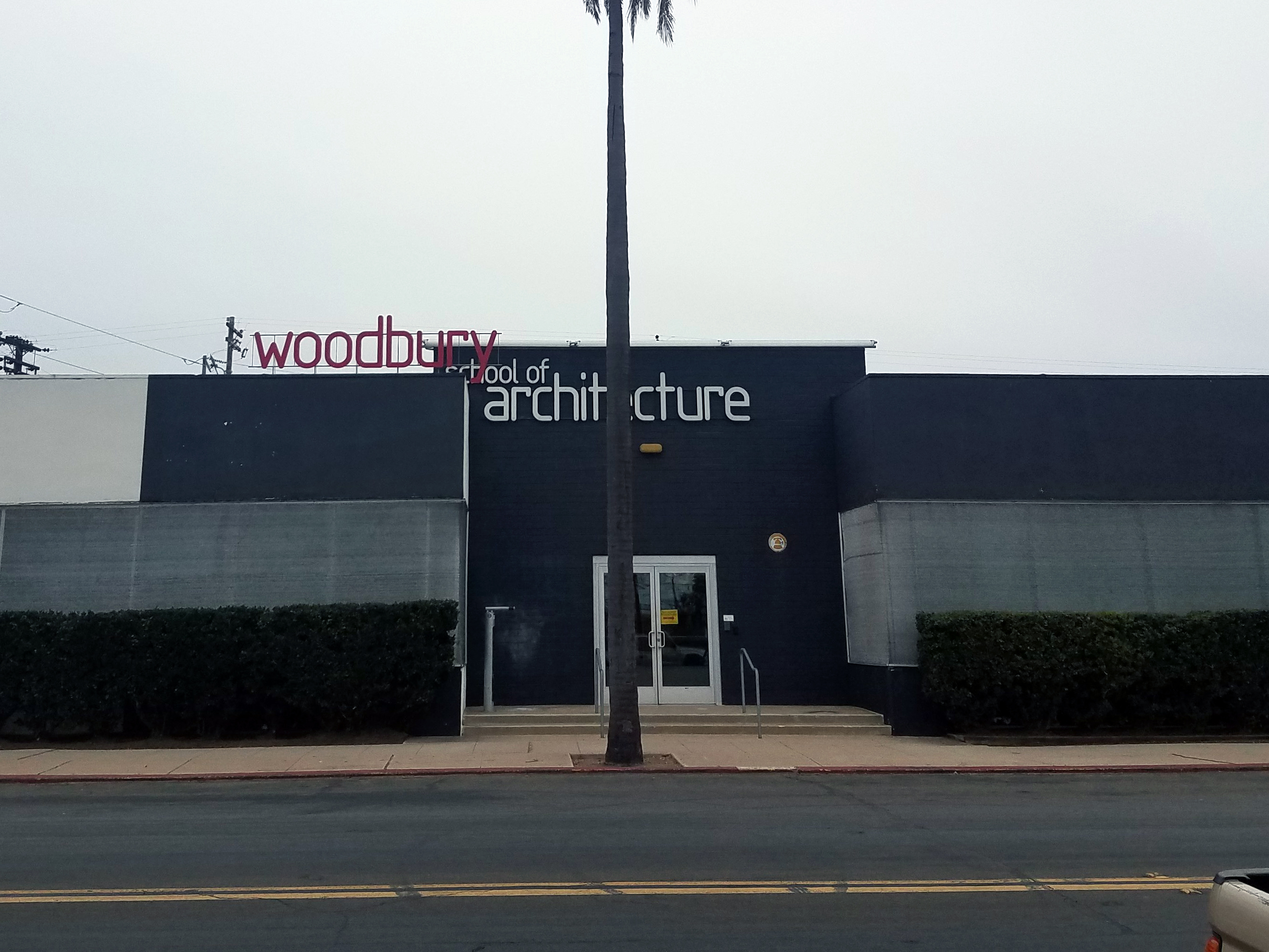
Front of the San Diego campus, 2018

In 1994, the university was organized into three schools: the School of Architecture and Design, the School of Business and Management, and the School of Arts and Sciences, with the School of Architecture and Design being accredited by the National Architecture Accrediting Board. That same year, the majors of psychology, politics & history and liberal arts & business were added to their curriculum. In 1998, the university opened a satellite campus in downtown San Diego, offering degrees in architecture. In 2008, the San Diego campus moved from downtown San Diego to the Barrio Logan neighborhood.

In 2012, the wife of then-university president Luis Calingo was alleged to have mistreated maintenance workers employed at the school, and was reported by Rose Nielsen, the wife of Calingo's predecessor Kenneth Nielsen. In September 2012, the month after she had reported the alleged incidents to the human resources department, Nielsen was fired and filed a lawsuit against the university. The case was settled out of court in February 2014.

In 2021, Woodbury University announced a plan to consolidate operations of the San Diego campus into the Burbank campus, shutting down the San Diego campus by the end of the spring semester in 2024. In 2023, Woodbury University announced that they would be exploring a strategic integration into the University of Redlands after Woodbury experienced lower enrollments and income. The two universities announced a merger in January 2024. On July 6, 2026, the University of Redlands announced that its merger with Woodbury University was completed after final approval from the U.S. Department of Education, with Woodbury now operating as the Los Angeles campus of the University of Redlands.

== Campus ==
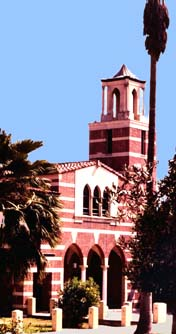
The Los Angeles Times Library

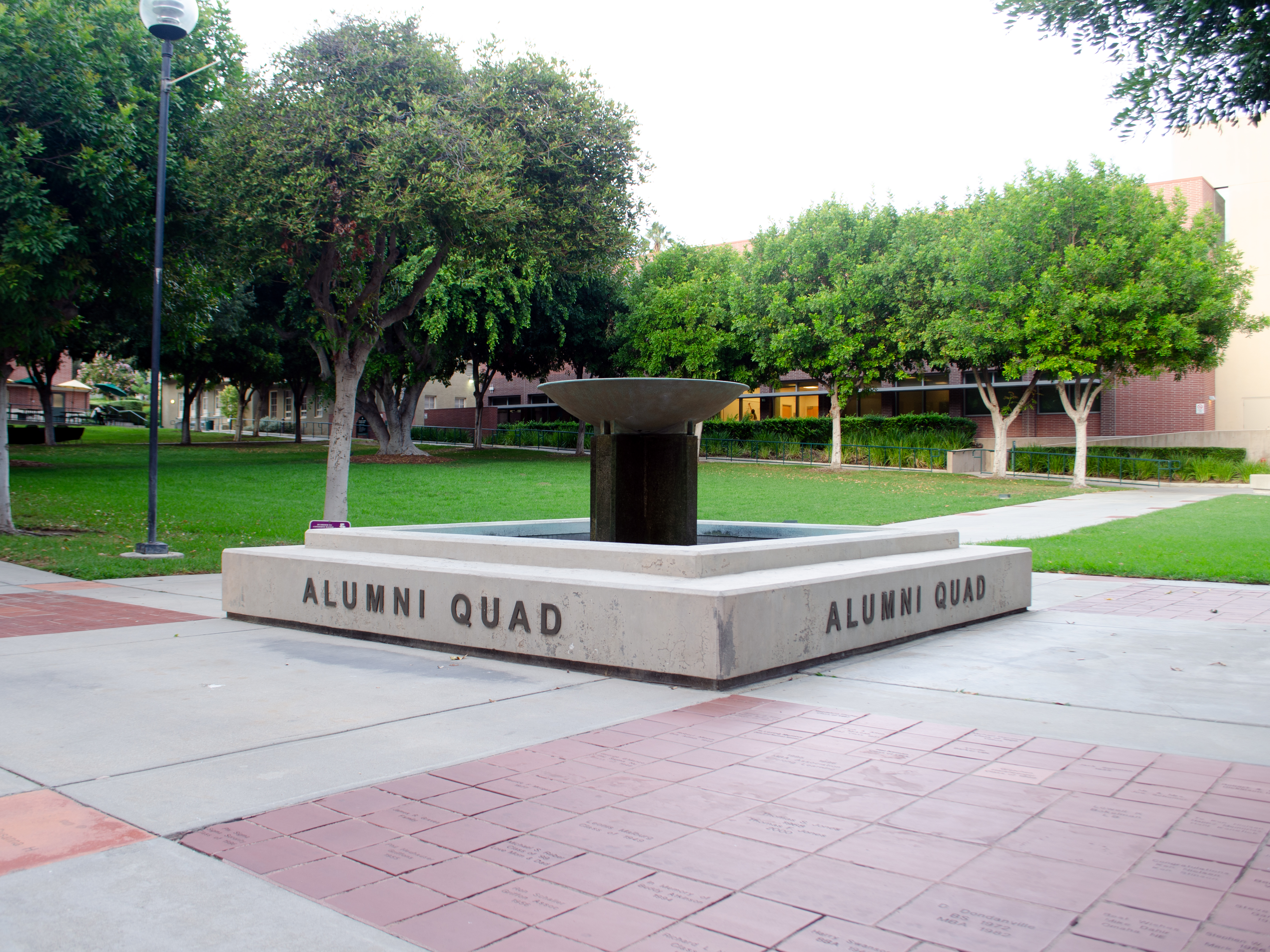
The Alumni Quad, with the Business Building in the background

Woodbury's campus was a 22.4-acre (9.1 ha) suburban campus at 7500 North Glenoaks Boulevard, which was previously used by Villa Cabrini Academy, an all-girls high school founded by Frances Xavier Cabrini ran by the Missionary Sisters of the Sacred Heart of Jesus. The school moved into the campus in 1987 after acquiring it two years prior. Although the campus is located within the boundaries of Los Angeles, the campus is inside the Burbank post office area and has a Burbank mailing address. The campus has been used as a filming location for various movies and shows, including The Brothers Sun and The Politician.

The campus was served by the Los Angeles Metro Bus via Line 92, which stops in front of the campus. The campus was also near the Hollywood Burbank Airport and the Burbank Airport–North station.

=== Los Angeles Times Library ===
The Los Angeles Times Library was within the former chapel of the Villa Cabrini Academy and the chapel's office annex. The library opened in 1987 after a series of renovations planned by two Woodbury alumni, with the library being dedicated to the Los Angeles Times in recognition of a contribution from the Times Mirror Company.

=== Solar Futures House ===
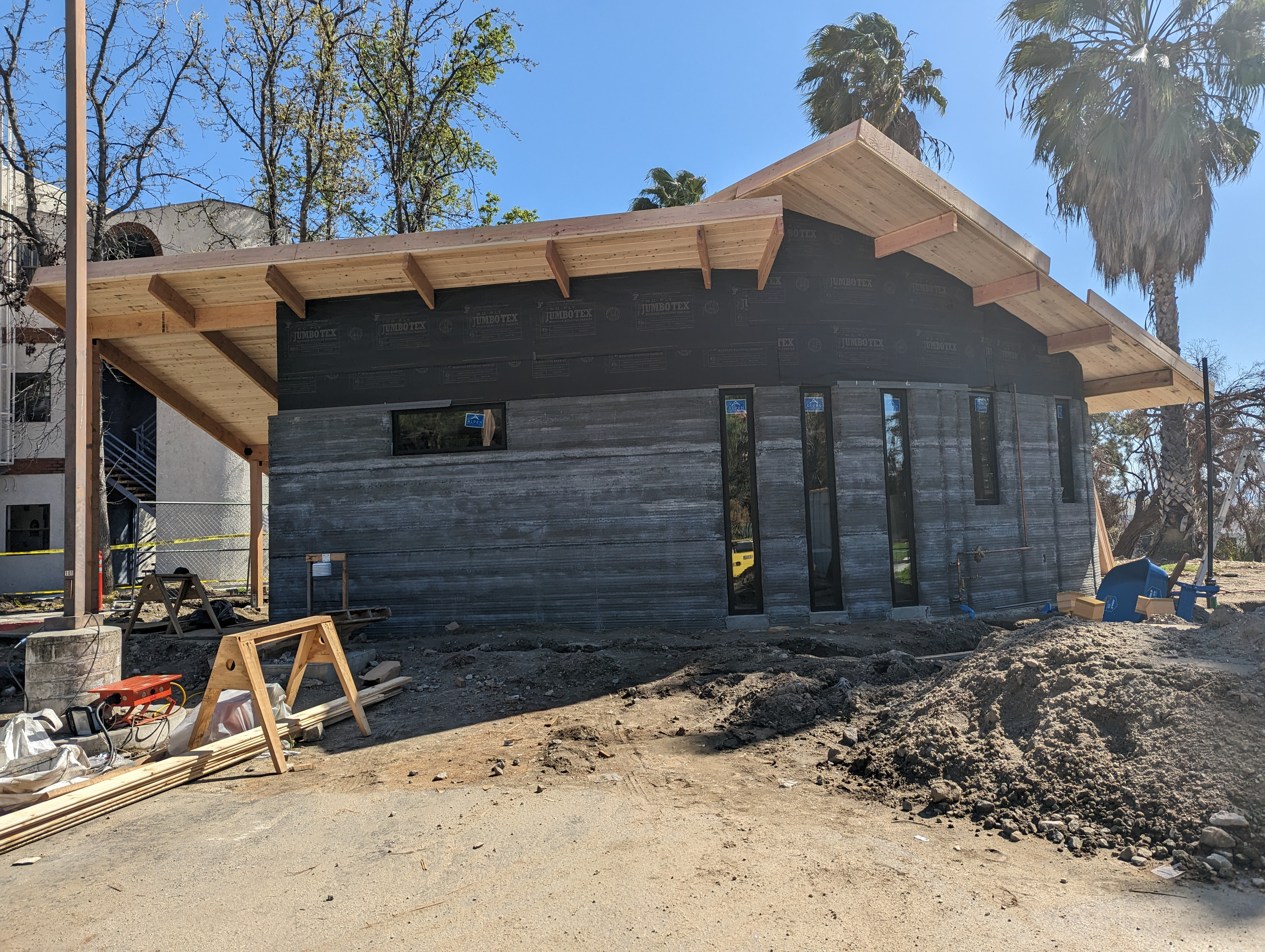
The Solar Futures House during its construction in 2023

The Solar Futures House was a 425-square-foot (39.5 m^{2}) home built using 3D concrete printing in the campus as part of the Solar Decathlon competition from the United States Department of Energy. The home took 15 months to complete from its initial design and cost US$250,000 with a grant of US$50,000 to start on the project. The home was built with solar panels and a greywater system, with the home having a bathroom, kitchen, living room, and bedroom. The building was designed by the university students in the architecture programs and was the first permitted structure in the city of Los Angeles, with the university administrators debating on how it might be used for university purposes.

== Academics ==
Woodbury was organized into four programs: The Woodbury Business Institute, the Center for Interdisciplinary Studies, the College of Architecture, Design and Media, which includes the Woodbury School of Architecture and Woodbury School of Design and Media Arts.

=== Julius Shulman Institute ===
The Julius Shulman Institute was part of the College of Architecture, Design and Media, with its mission being to promote "understanding and appreciation of photography of the built environment".

The institute was founded in 2005 by Julius Shulman from a financial endowment, choosing the university because of his interest in education. The institute annually gives the Excellence in Photography Award to photographers, with prior awardees being Iwan Baan, Pedro E. Guerrero, Catherine Opie, Hélène Binet and James Welling.

=== Rankings and accreditation ===
Woodbury was accredited by the WASC Senior College and University Commission and approved by the Postsecondary Commission of the California Department of Education. The Western Association of Schools and Colleges granted Woodbury its original regional accreditation in 1961. Woodbury was also accredited by the Association to Advance Collegiate Schools of Business, with the School of Business receiving its accreditation from the Association of Collegiate Business Schools and Programs in 1998. In 1994, the Architecture program was accredited by the National Architectural Accrediting Board. In 1991, the Interior Architecture Program was accredited by the Council for Interior Design Accreditation. In 2008, the school received accreditation from the National Association of Schools of Art and Design.

It was ranked 53rd in U.S. News & World Report's 2019 annual ranking of regional universities, placing at 31st in the "Top Performers on Social Mobility" category and 32nd in the "Best Value for School" category. It finished with a score of 42 out of 100 in the overall rankings for that year. That previous year, it ranked at 59th place on the U.S. News & World Report's ranking, scoring 43 points out of 100. In the Niche Best Colleges rankings, Woodbury ranked at 251st place in the Best Colleges for Art in America. It was ranked 34th overall in The Economist's first-ever college rankings published in October 2015. It was also ranked 10th among the 161 ranked colleges and universities in California in The New York Times's "Overall mobility index" in 2017.

== Student body ==
Undergraduate demographics as of Fall 2021
Race and ethnicity	Total
Hispanic	38.7%
White	35.5%
Asian	9.9%
Black	4.9%
Other (Note: Other consists of Multiracial Americans and those who prefer to not say.)	4.5%
Economic diversity
Low-income (Note: The percentage of students who received an income-based federal Pell grant intended for low-income students.)	39%
Affluent (Note: The percentage of students who are a part of the American middle class at the bare minimum.)	61%

For the academic year of 2022–2023, Woodbury University had a total enrollment of 1,036 students, of which 937 were undergraduate and 99 were graduate. Approximately 52% are female and 48% of students are male, with 22% of the students living in on-campus housing and 78% of students living off campus.

=== Housing ===
Woodbury had two residence halls with space for approximately 225 residents. South Hall, which was a small building composed mostly of single rooms, was built in the 1960s and housed up to 67 residents. South Hall was one of the original buildings acquired with the Burbank campus and was used as a dormitory for the Villa Cabrini Academy. North Hall, the larger of the two residence halls, opened in 1990 and housed up to 158 residents.

== Notable people ==
=== Faculty ===
- Rachel Allen – architect
- Jerry Beck – animation historian and cartoon producer
- Barbara Bestor – architect and founder of Bestor Architecture
- Nir Buras – architect, urban planner, and author
- Jeanine Centuori – architect and public artist
- Annie Chu – architect, interior designer, and professor of mathematics
- April Greiman – designer
- Ric Heitzman – artist, voice actor and designer
- Michelle Kaufmann – architect and designer
- Mark Kirkland – animation director; director for The Simpsons from 1990 to 2021
- Bill Kovacs – computer animator
- Newton Lee – computer scientist
- Ken Ono – mathematician
- Camillia Monet – actress and film producer
- Aaron Neubert – architect
- Patrick Nickell – sculptor and visual artist
- David Wyn Roberts – architect
- Gini Graham Scott – author, songwriter, and game developer
- Stephanie Thomas – fashion stylist and creative director
- Michaele Pride-Wells – architect
- Curt Pringle – politician and former Mayor of Anaheim

=== Alumni ===
- Hamid Baeidinejad – diplomat
- Cleo Baldon – landscape architect
- Germane Barnes – architect and designer
- Wayne K. Blickenstaff – lieutenant colonel in the United States Army Air Forces
- Helen Gurley Brown – author, publisher, businesswoman, and editor-in-chief of Cosmopolitan
- Adolfo Camarillo – land owner and horse breeder
- Andi Campognone – curator, author, and film producer
- Bruce Cox – photographer for the Los Angeles Times
- Mahealani Cypher – historian and community advocate
- Richard Denning – actor
- Brittany Diego – fashion stylist and founder of Fashion Mentor
- Lola Abiola-Edewor – politician
- Gabriel Green – ufologist
- Princess Halliday – TV personality and talk show host
- Percy V. Hammon – politician and attorney
- Helen Hannah – chaperone for the Muskegon Lassies from 1947 to 1949
- Georg Herold – artist
- Lou Kimzey – magazine editor and publisher
- JaQuel Knight – choreographer and dancer
- Alan Leitner – abstract artist
- Won Ju Lim – artist
- Glenard P. Lipscomb – politician and congressman
- Leonis C. Malburg – politician and Mayor of Vernon, California
- Kenneth Mejia – activist, accountant, and City Controller of Los Angeles
- Janee Michelle – actress, model, dancer, and businessperson
- Louisa Moritz – actress and lawyer
- Kamel Muhyieddeen – politician
- Star Parker – politician and syndicated columnist
- Marepe – artist
- Mirela Rupic – costume and fashion designer
- Joseph M. Souki – politician and former Speaker of the Hawaii House of Representatives
- Eric Stryker – performer and model
- Robert Asa Todd – journalist and politician
- William Travilla – costume designer
- Damian Terriquez – actor
- Gene Trindl – photographer
