= Rachel Allen (architect) =

American architect

- Born: 1970 (age 55–56); San Francisco, California
- Education: Princeton University
- Occupation: Architect
- Practice: Radar, Inc.
- Website: radarinc.net

Rachel Allen (born 1970) is an American architect based in Los Angeles, California. She is the principal and president of Radar, Inc. (previously Rachel Allen Architecture) founded in 2002. Examples of the firm's wide range of clients include Grand Central Market, Califia Farms, California State Parks, and Supreme.

== Early life ==
Allen was born and raised in the San Francisco Bay Area. She attended high school at the Convent of the Sacred Heart located in the original Flood Mansion, a fact she has cited as influencing her early interest in architecture.

== Career ==
Allen began her architectural career in San Francisco at the age of 16, hired on the basis of handmade drawings from classes taken at the De Young Museum of Art. She went on to graduate summa cum laude from Princeton (A.B. and M. Arch. degrees) and was inducted into Phi Beta Kappa. She was hired out of school by Gehry Partners where she worked for five years and is a winner of the American Academy's prestigious Rome Prize in Architecture.

Allen has taught architecture at UCLA, SCI-Arc, Woodbury University School of Architecture in Burbank, California, and the University of Southern California (USC). She is a member of the American Institute of Architects (AIA), the Urban Land Institute, and a graduate of Goldman Sachs 10K Small Businesses Program.

Allen's firm has designed single and multi-family residential projects in Carpinteria, Echo Park, Highland Park, Eagle Rock, and Riverside. Radar has also designed commercial and institutional projects in Berkeley, Los Angeles, Miami, and Mexico. In 2019 her firm was awarded the Southern California Development Forum (SCDF) award for Urban Innovation for Libros Schmibros, a free lending library in Boyle Heights.

== Personal life ==
Allen is married to Chicago-born conceptual artist Guerino (Gary) Cannone and has one daughter.
