= KLCS =

Television station in Los Angeles, California

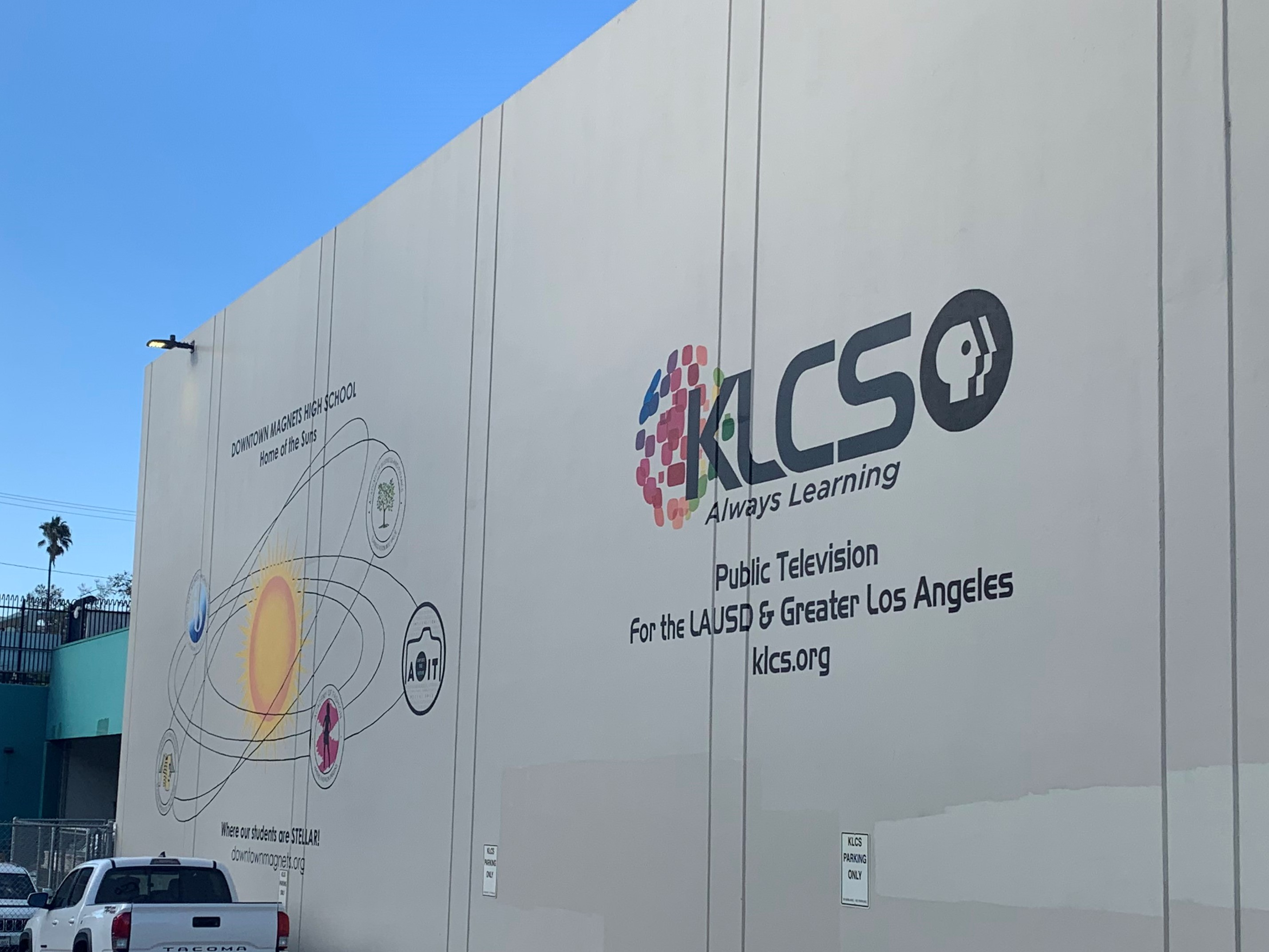
- KLCS studios in downtown Los Angeles
- Los Angeles, California; United States
- Channels: Digital: 28 (UHF), shared with KCET; Virtual: 58
- Branding: KLCS Public Media PBS

Programming
- Affiliations: 58.1: PBS; for others, see § Subchannels

Ownership
- Owner: Los Angeles Unified School District

History
- First air date: November 5, 1973
- Former channel numbers: Analog: 58 (UHF, 1973–2009); Digital: 41 (UHF, 2003–2018)
- Call sign meaning: Los Angeles City Schools

Technical information
- Licensing authority: FCC
- Facility ID: 38430
- ERP: 150 kW
- HAAT: 926.4 m (3,039 ft)
- Transmitter coordinates: 34°13′26″N 118°3′47″W

Links
- Public license information: Public file; LMS
- Website: www.klcs.org

KLCS (channel 58) is a tertiary PBS member television station in Los Angeles, California, United States. Owned by the Los Angeles Unified School District (LAUSD), it is one of eight television stations in the U.S. that are operated by a local school system. KLCS' studios are located at the former Downtown Magnets High School campus on West Temple Street in downtown Los Angeles, and its transmitter is located atop Mount Wilson.

KLCS is one of four PBS member stations in the Los Angeles market; the others are KVCR-DT (channel 24) in San Bernardino, which serves the Inland Empire; KOCE-TV (channel 50) in Huntington Beach; and KOCE-TV's sister station KCET (channel 28) in Los Angeles, which KOCE-TV replaced in 2011 as the city's primary PBS station. Since the spectrum auction in 2018, when KLCS sold its physical channel, it has been a guest on KCET's channel 28 signal. KLCS remains the fifth most-watched public television station in the country.

== History ==
=== Pre-KLCS years (1957–1973) ===
In October 1957, the Los Angeles Unified School District began producing televised instructional programs to be viewed in school by students. By the 1966–67 school year, it was producing over 700 television programs per year for broadcast on various local stations in the Los Angeles area and leasing airtime to broadcast 40 hours of instructional programming Monday through Friday each week. Over the years, the district earned the support of teachers and administrators who were impressed with the effectiveness of the programs on the learning experience in the classroom.

In 1963, the LAUSD began the application process to acquire a license from the Federal Communications Commission (FCC) and launch its own full-service television station on UHF channel 58. In 1967, the district also applied for and later received state and federal grants to build and equip a broadcast facility for the new station. In the summer of that year, advocates for the LAUSD testified before the FCC on the benefits of an instructional television station for students, staff and the local community. Five years later, on March 3, 1972, the FCC granted the district a license to broadcast on channel 58, and the new station signed on the air on November 5, 1973, as KLCS, the call letters an apparent acronym for "Los Angeles City Schools".

=== Present operations ===
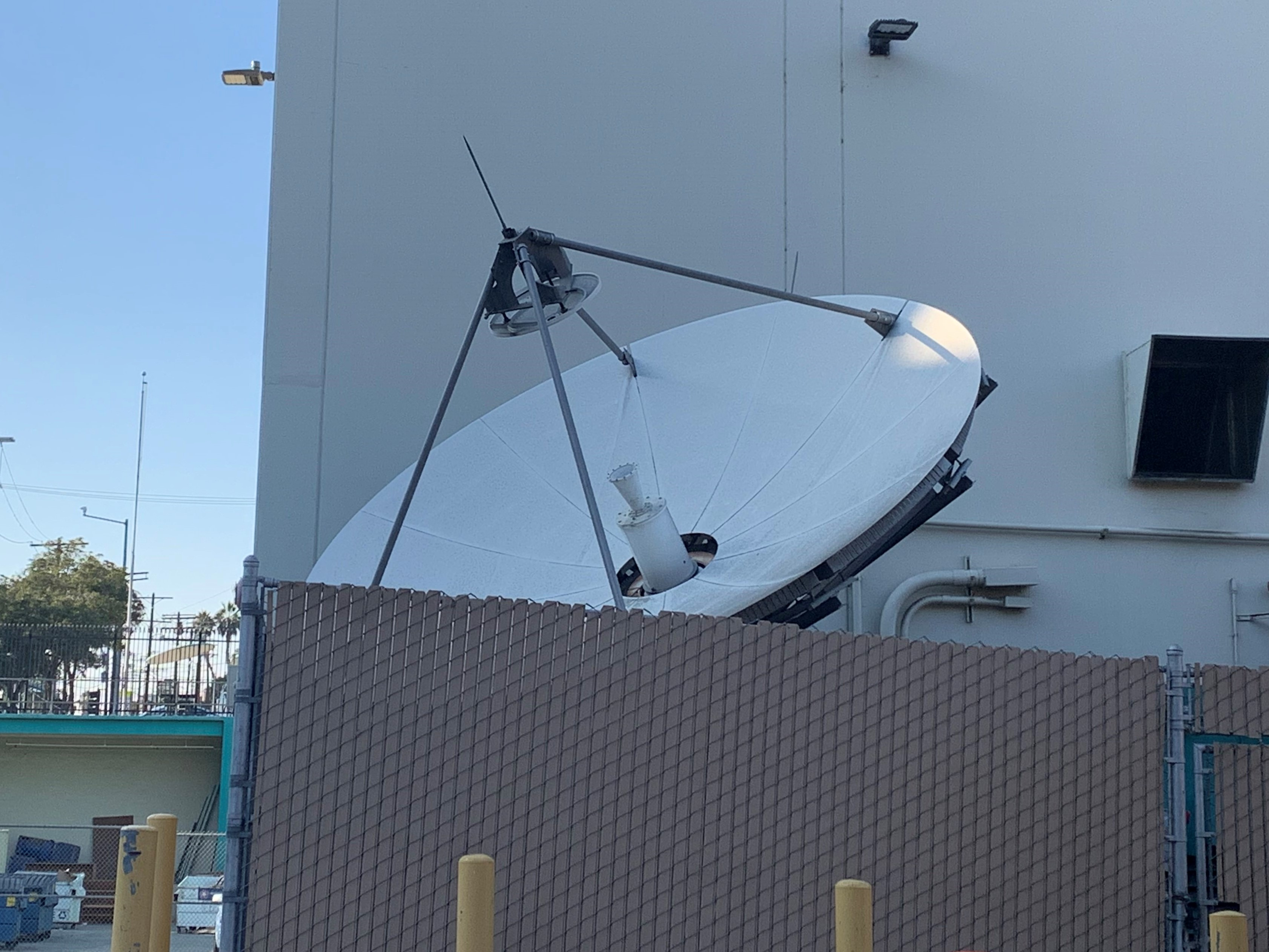
Satellite dish used by KLCS.

The station presently produces more than 700 hours of educational, informational, sports and entertainment programming a year, including live telecourse instruction from the California State University system. It is one of five television stations licensed in the Los Angeles market that continue to utilize their original call signs, alongside KTLA (channel 5), KTTV (channel 11), KCET (channel 28) and KMEX-TV (channel 34).

Since 1984, KLCS has produced Homework Hotline. Created by then general manager Patricia Prescott-Marshall, Homework Hotline is a weekday afterschool call-in program where students receive homework help from LAUSD teachers and other faculty who appear on the show. In its first year, Homework Hotline was featured in a Time magazine article titled "Education: Help from the Hotline", and has won many Los Angeles Area Emmy Awards over the years, including two in 1986 for Best Instructional Program and Creative Technical Crafts.

Unlike most public television stations, KLCS does not hold an annual pledge drive. However, its website lists special premiums and discounts given to subscribers who support the station at various levels, including recognition on-air and in KLCS' monthly viewer magazine. KLCS was slated to begin high definition broadcasting in the autumn of 2014, but remained in standard definition until April 23, 2018, when the station began HD broadcasting at 720p following a reallocation to digital channel 28.

For a period of time, instead of broadcasting a 24-hour program schedule, KLCS signed off at the end of each broadcast day, ceasing programming on some or all of its four subchannels at either 1 or 2 a.m. and resuming its schedule later that morning at either 5 or 6 a.m. One subchannel may continue overnight programming, such as for Create programs or regular meetings of the Los Angeles County Board of Supervisors, while the others have individually signed off. In lieu of a test pattern, an overnight-themed title card is aired reminding viewers to tune in again when programming resumes. This made KLCS one of the largest television stations in the United States by market size to still have traditional sign-on and sign-off procedures. KLCS has since resumed a 24-hour schedule. Its second digital subchannel also broadcasts 24 hours a day and is featured as part of DirecTV's digital programming package.

When Janalyn Glymph retired, Sabrina Fair-Thomas became general manager in July 2012 after being with the station for over 25 years.

Partnering with the Idea To Reality development team, Saul Davis and Joe Regis, KLCS debuted new station IDs in 2015 featuring Los Angeles Mayor Eric Garcetti, Bill Nye, Mark Wahlberg, Moby, Flea, and Joaquin Phoenix, as well as new station taglines including "Live Learn Love LA" and "TV's Force For Good".

As of autumn 2018, KLCS' new general manager is Jaime Jimenez.

== Programming ==
KLCS produces local programming focused on LA Unified.

From 2006 to 2019, KLCS produced the interview show Between the Lines With Barry Kibrick, which was distributed nationally by the National Educational Telecommunications Association. In 2019, the program became an independently produced podcast.

=== History ===
- Homework Hotline
- LAUSD Board Meetings
- On The Record
- LAUSD Memo
- In Their Own Words
- NewsBriefs
- Special event coverage including:
  - Video in the Classroom (VIC) Awards
  - Academic Decathlon SuperQuiz and Banquet
  - Superstars Conference
  - Interscholastic Championships
  - Superintendent's Address to Administrators
  - College Prepared Career Ready
- The Teachers Hour
- The Parent Connection
- Teachers & Their Coaches
- Hollywood Homeroom
- At the Table with Los Angeles Unified

== Technical information ==
=== Subchannels ===
Subchannels of KCET and KLCS
| License | Subchannel | Res. | Short name | Programming |
|---|---|---|---|---|
| KCET | 28.1 | 720p | KCET HD | PBS |
| KCET | 28.2 | 480i | Create | Create |
| KCET | 28.3 | 480i | N H K | NHK World |
| KLCS | 58.1 | 720p | KLCS-HD | PBS |
| KLCS | 58.2 | 480i | KIDS-TV | PBS Kids |
| KLCS | 58.3 | 480i | CREATE | Create |

The Annenberg Channel aired on channel 58.4 until October 1, 2008, when that service was discontinued. MHz WorldView was broadcast from August 2013 until December 29, 2015. FNX was broadcast on 58.4 from December 30, 2015, until April 22, 2018, when the fourth subchannel ceased broadcasting with the switch of the main channel to HD. At one stage, there were subchannels devoted to elementary students (58.2), secondary students (58.3) and teachers' professional development (58.4).

=== Analog-to-digital conversion ===
KLCS shut down its analog signal, over UHF channel 58, at 3 p.m. on June 12, 2009, as part of the federally mandated transition from analog to digital television. The station's digital signal remained on its pre-transition UHF channel 41, using virtual channel 58.

=== Channel sharing ===
In February 2014, KLCS and KJLA were granted special temporary authority by the FCC to conduct trials in partnership with CTIA and the Association of Public Television Stations, which tested the ability and viability of broadcasting two sets of television services within the same 6 MHz channel band, including varying combinations of high and standard definition feeds. These tests came as the FCC was in the process of preparing for a spectrum auction in 2015; broadcasters will be able to voluntarily sell their television spectrum to the government, and then receive profits from its sale to wireless providers. An FCC spokesperson stated that channel sharing would allow broadcasters to "[take] advantage of the incentive auction's once-in-a-lifetime financial opportunity", while still maintaining its ability to run over-the-air television programming. The experiment, which occurred in March 2014, was deemed successful, although certain scenarios (particularly two HD feeds on both channels) were found to affect video quality on more complex content.

On September 10, 2014, KLCS announced that, following negotiations with KCETLink, the owner of educational independent and former PBS station KCET (who would later rejoin PBS in 2019 as a sister station to KOCE-TV), it would partake in a channel-sharing arrangement and sell its existing spectrum during the incentive auction. Both stations will retain separate licenses. In April 2017, KLCS received $130,510,880 in a spectrum auction, yielding its channel 41 physical channel, so it could begin sharing the signal on channel 28 of KCET, as a guest. This sharing change took place in May 2018.
