= Mahealani Cypher =

American historian

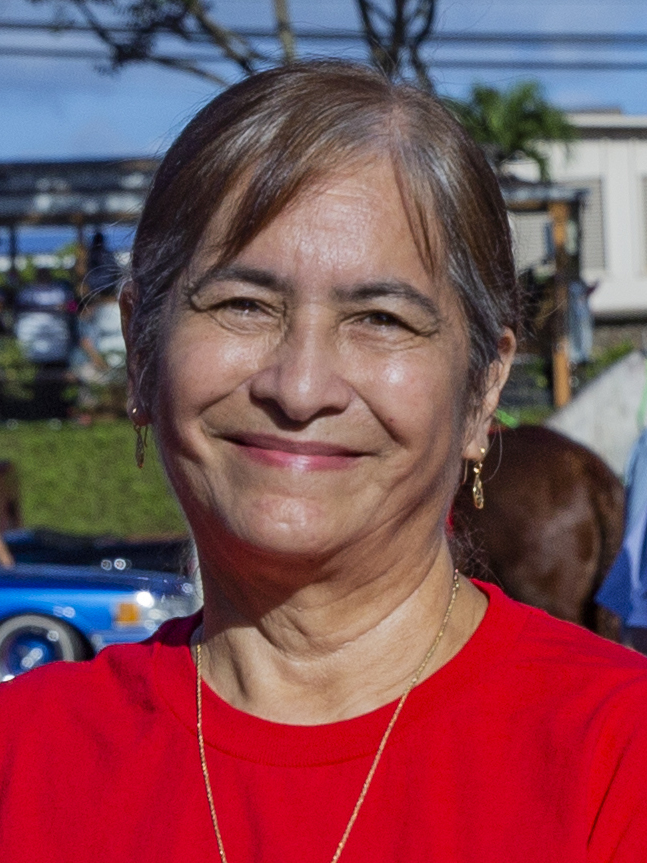
- Cypher in 2018
- Born: Denise Mahealani Cypher DeCosta; July 16, 1946 (age 79)
- Education: Woodbury University; University of Hawaiʻi at Mānoa

Denise Mahealani Cypher DeCosta (born July 16, 1946) is a historian, community advocate, Hawaiian cultural practitioner, and owner of Native Knowledge LLC. Cypher was a former president of the Oʻahu Association of Hawaiian Civic Club, and the Koʻolaupoko Hawaiian Civic Club. She is a born and raised kamaʻāina of Kāneʻohe and has authored Distinguished Kamaʻāina of Kāneʻohe Bay Koʻolaupoko II (2017). Of her recognitions she was awarded the Frank Haines Award for Lifetime Achievement by the Hawaiʻi Historic Foundation (2019). She has helped to create the Ahupuaʻa Boundary Marker project on the island of Oʻahu, and is renowned for her advocacy on the windward side, in particular for native rights, prevention of urban sprawl, and her opposition to the construction of the Interstate Highway known as the H-3.

== Early life ==
Cypher is a kamaʻāina born and raised in Kāneʻohe and comes from a family of civil service. She is a descendant of generations of family who were among the founders, members, and leaders of the Koʻolaupoko Hawaiian Civic Club. Her kūpuna shared with her the stories of old from historical instances such as the bombing of Pearl Harbor by her grandmother to Hawaiian stories that would contribute to her identity and actions later in life. At a young age she recalls traveling with her grandmother and taught the location of the various ahupuaʻa, or traditional Hawaiian land division. According to her, her values toward others and the ʻāina of Hawaiʻi came to her from examples set by her grandparents Elizabeth and George Cypher.

== Politics and education ==
=== Early education (1954–1968) ===
Cypher graduated from St. Andrews Priory in 1964. She attended Woodbury University studying journalism and business and also attended the University of Hawaiʻi at Mānoa, where she studied Journalism. While attending the University of Hawaiʻi at Mānoa she was a reporter and editor of the student newspaper Ka Leo, and worked part time for the University catalogue.

=== Construction of The H-3 (1972–1992) ===
When Cypher returned to living in Kāneʻohe she was hired by the Sun Press community newspapers. In her works as news editor, she would encounter news reports about the controversial proposed construction of the interstate highway known as H-3. After reading all 13 volumes of the EIS and the Socio-economic impact statement, Cypher decided to oppose the project for the urban sprawl it would cause on the windward side of Oʻahu and the adverse impact it would cause to sacred Hawaiian sites including but not limited to: Kūkuiokāne, Kānehekili Heiau, and the Hālawa heiau complex that contained a Hale ʻo Papa, and Luakini, among others. Cypher would then write articles and editorials to inform the community about the impact the H-3 would have. Over the years Cypher volunteered with organizations: Hālawa Coalition, Mālama Kūkuiokane, Stop H-3 Association, Moanalua Gardens Foundation, and helped to establish the Koʻolau Foundation; all of whom actively advocated against the construction of the highway and later advocated for mitigation to meet the needs of the damage caused to sacred sites. It would be in Hālawa where she would assist groups to access the valley to protect culturally significant sites and conduct cultural practices as acts of native resurgence in opposition to the highways construction. With the controversy the H-3 had at the time, Cypher was sure to keep a low profile as she had worked with the Board of Water Supply at the time and could not risk being caught amid the controversy.

While working with the Sun Press newspapers, Cypher would write various articles and editorials regarding development and community concerns in Windward, Oʻahu. ACypher developed her background in advocacy through her experiences working as staff writer for Unity House, where she learned about the values and strength of labor unions under the mentorship of labor leader Arthur Rutledge; as a researcher for the House of Representatives; as a newswriter for KHON TV2 news and a reporter for KHVH Newsradio; as staff and later - after her retirement - as vice chair of the Honolulu Board of Water Supply; and finally as Honolulu City Clerk, where she helped modernize operations of the Clerk's Office and county elections security. As a lifelong Democrat, her support for Mayor Frank Fasi placed her at odds with other Party members during the 1970s intra-party disputes, but she maintained her support for the colorful Mayor until his term ended. She was also an active participant in the Hawaiian initiative for self-determination known as Ka Lahui Hawai`i, serving as communications advisor and grants writer for some time during the early 1990s. Cypher also participated in the 1993 Onipa'a March to the palace marking the centennial of the overthrow of the Hawaiian Kingdom. Cypher would also volunteer much time to the Koʻolaupoko Hawaiian Civic Club which she would later become president of the club, and actively work to support the perpetuation of the Hawaiian Culture.

=== Post-construction and later politics (1992–present) ===
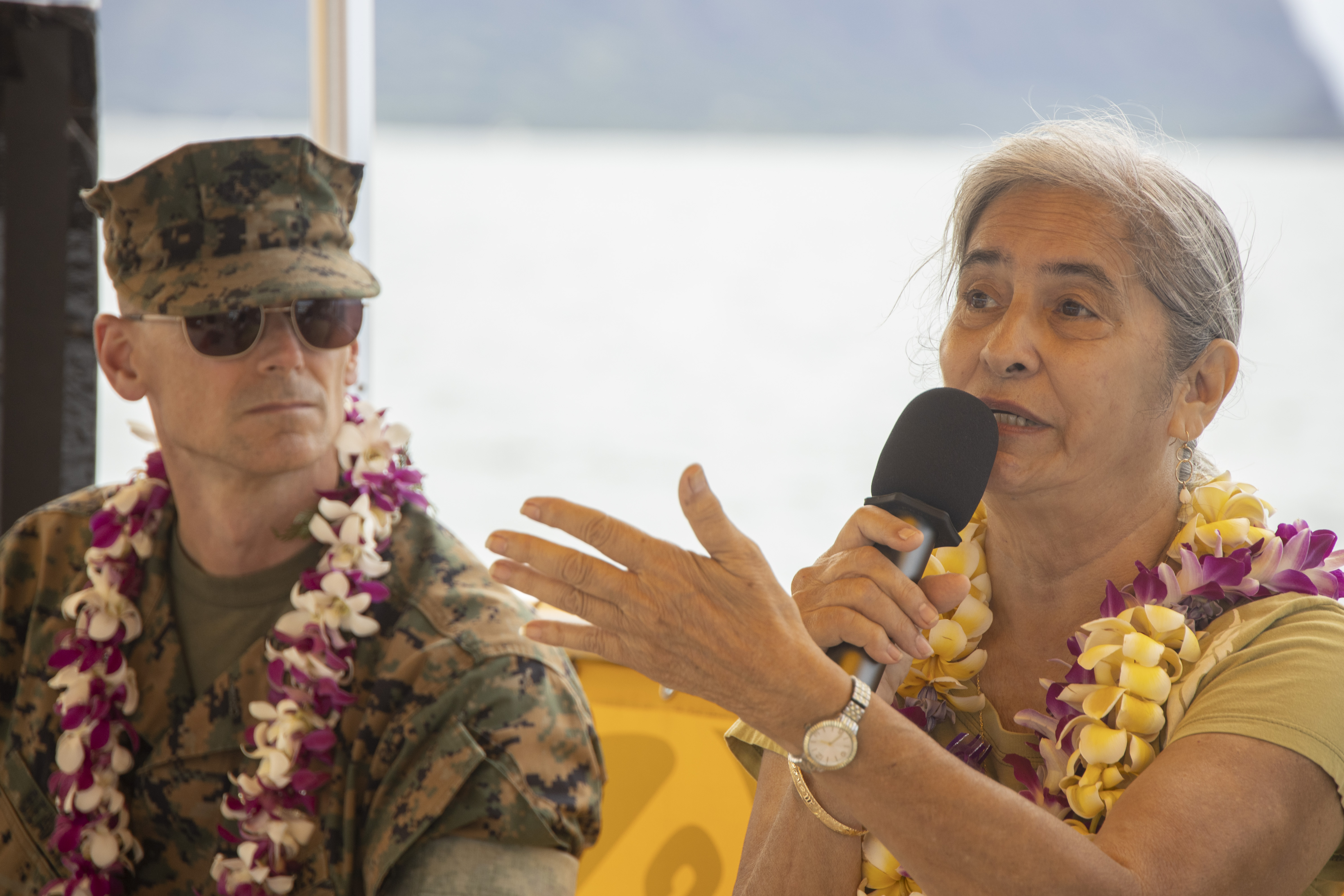
Cyper speaking at the Kaneohe Bay Cultural Orientation Tour in 2023.

Even after the highways completion, Cypher remains firm in her position against the H-3, and she still works to mitigate the adverse impacts of the highway to this day. When the State announced its intended "fun run" to celebrate the opening of the Highway, Cypher and Lilikalā Kameʻeleihiwa were featured on a PSA encouraging others to not participate, out of respect for the Hawaiians sites and burials that had been impacted by the Highway. She personally refuses to use the highway, out of her respect for the sacred sites and burials that she feels were disturbed or destroyed by the building of the road. Cypher is a board member of the Koʻolau Foundation which was formerly known as the Stop H-3 Association, that fought against the highway. She has done various consultations with state agencies to work on mitigating the impacts caused by the highway to culturally significant sites. Along with many other practitioners and board members of the Koʻolau Foundation, she works to establish a cultural preserve in Haʻikū Valley, which was adversely impacted by the highways construction. The cultural preserve includes rehabilitating the OMEGA Station transmitter building into a Koʻolau Museum and Cultural Center to feature information regarding the history of the lands affected by H-3, the Omega station itself, and the highway project

Throughout the early 2000's Cypher would continue her work at the Board of Water Supply and in the community. Among her noted projects was her efforts with the Ko'olaupoko Hawaiian Civic Club to create the Ahupua'a Boundary Marker Project, a first of its kind in contemporary times. This would be to mark the boundaries of traditional Hawaiian land divisions called the Ahupua'a. This effort was expanded from the Ko`olaupoko district to islandwide after Cypher was elected president of the O`ahu Council of the Association of Hawaiian Civic Clubs. The initiative led to similar efforts to mark traditional land boundaries among neighboring islands of Kaua`i, Maui and Hawai`i. Among her other endeavors, Cypher - along with fellow practitioner Leialoha "Rocky" Kaluhiwa - worked to legalize restoration of Native Hawaiian burial practices, an initiative that would be passed into law in 2015. She was also essential in the renaming of Kaneohe Beach Park to the traditional name Nāʻonealaʻa.

== Career ==
Cypher would begin working at the age of 5 selling the newspaper, the Star-Bulletin. From there, journalism had become a part of her life as, in later years, she would go on to serve as city editor for the University of Hawai`i newspaper Ka Leo and later staff writer for the Unity House newspaper of the Hawai`i Teamsters and Hotel Workers unions, newswriter for KHON TV2 news, and reporter for KHVH Newsradio. Her strong advocacy for community developed during her work as news editor for the Sun Press weekly newspapers, which covered news in five Oʻahu communities during the 1970s.

Cypher's passion for serving the community would go on into working within government. As lead researcher for the House of Representatives minority office, she was able to delve deeply into major issues of concern from a statewide perspective; and, while serving as City Clerk for the county of Honolulu, she experienced the broad scope of matters on the county level from land use to elections governance. After retiring in 2003 as community relations chief and spokeswoman for the Honolulu Board of Water Supply, she was appointed in 2009 to serve as a member of the agency's board of directors, where she served as vice chair for several years. She also worked in Hawaii Departments the DLIR & DSSH.

After the construction of the H-3, Cypher would go on with other advocates and cultural practitioners to form the Ko'olau Foundation - a non-profit organization with the intent of caring for the sacred places and spaces. Although their efforts have been primarily focused on sites affected by construction of the H-3 highway, the organization has statewide interest in advocacy for preservation, restoration and support for historic sites and cultural properties. It is the Koʻolau Foundation where Cypher remains as a board member and cultural advisor, working with other board members and volunteers to perpetuate and preserve Hawaiʻi`s rich history and heritage.

== Awards ==
- 11th Annual Frank Haines Award, Historic Hawaiʻi Foundation, May 31, 2019
- Resolution of Appreciation, Honolulu Board of Water Supply, December 15, 2014
- Ka Poʻokela o Kūhio Award, Outstanding Hawaiian Civic Club Member, Association of Hawaiian Civic Clubs 2007
- Helen C. Kane Award Winner, Koʻolaupoko Hawaiian Civic Club, 2014
- Outstanding Member Award, American Water Works Association/Hawaii Section, 1990
- Patriotic American Civilian Award, Federal Executive Board, 1977
- Outstanding Young Women Recognition, Hawaiʻi State Legislature, 1977
