= Bruce Cox =

American photographer

- Born: c. 1918; Clovis, New Mexico, U.S.
- Died: 2004 (age 85-86)
- Education: Woodbury University
- Occupation: Photographer

Bruce Cox (c. 1918 - 2004) was an American photographer who worked for the Los Angeles Times from 1946 to 1980.
