= Alan Leitner =

American painter

Untitled #4, oil wash and alkyd on canvas painting by Alan Leitner, 1998, Honolulu Museum of Art

Alan Leitner (born 1947) is an American abstract painter.

== Biography ==
He was born in 1947 in an ethnically diverse section of Los Angeles. Alan was the middle of three children in a Jewish family.

He received his B.S. in art in 1971 from Woodbury University in Los Angeles, where he met his first wife who wanted to move to Hawaii. Also in 1971, he acquired an art foundry that produced blown glass, sculpture, ceramics and paintings, which contributed greatly to his understanding of art. In 1987, he received a M.F.A. in painting from the University of Hawaii at Manoa.

The graduate program required students to do some teaching, and through this teaching he met Alyn Brownley who at the time headed the art program at Leeward Community College. Brownley requested Alan to teach her art class for one semester while she pursued a move to University of Hawaii at Manoa. After graduation, Dr. John Conner, the department associate dean, offered Alan a full-time teaching position at Leeward Community College, where he is currently a professor. Alan has also taught at Honolulu Community College and University of Hawaii at Manoa.

Leitner's art is abstract, utilizing muted earth tones as the main colors. He often affixes various objects to his canvases. Untitled #4, in the collection of the Honolulu Museum of Art, is typical of his later work.
