= Brittany Diego =

American fashion stylist (born 1994)

- Born: 1994 (age 31–32); Belize
- Education: Downtown Magnets High School; Woodbury University (BFA)
- Occupation: Fashion stylist
- Years active: 2011–present
- Title: Founder of Fashion Mentor

Brittany Diego (born 1994) is an American fashion stylist and founder of Fashion Mentor based in Los Angeles, California. She has worked for Trevor Jackson, Draya Michele, Karen Civil, DaniLeigh and companies including TechStyle Fashion Group, MTV and The CW.

== Biography ==
=== Early life and education ===
Diego was born in Belize before moving to Los Angeles in the early 2000's. Diego wanted to be in the fashion industry since the age of ten and set her sights on becoming a fashion designer. She attended Downtown Magnets High School in the Academy of Fashion Design & Merchandising, and attended Woodbury University where she majored in fashion design and worked on various internships.

=== Career ===
After graduating college, she was disappointed because of her only landing internships but also because of the "toxic mindset in the industry that needed to be corrected." She then landed a job with an employer who, shortly after, laid her off. After that, she spent her time on creating a new company called Fashion Mentor. She struggled when opening the business, saying in an interview, "burnt myself out. I quickly realized, if I wanted Fashion Mentor to grow, I would need help from others who supported my vision, and it was the best decision I ever made." She then started being independent, documenting her works on Instagram where she also gave advice to others like her.

In 2021, she was featured on Forbes' Next 1000.

== Fashion Mentor ==
Fashion Mentor
- Founded: April 2018; 8 years ago in Los Angeles, California
- Founder: Brittney Diego
- Website: www.fashionmentor.co

Fashion Mentor is described as a "career development platform that provides millennials with the tools, resources, and knowledge to lead successful careers in the fashion industry through digital products, workshops, and virtual classes." Diego started the company as a way to have up-and-coming stylists have a successful career with the right resources.

It was originally a blog that documented things she learned before expanding into a digital platform with a podcast, YouTube channel and an online community. It has started classes since March 2019.
