= Mirela Rupic =

American costume and fashion designer (born 1967)

- Born: Mirela Rupic; March 21, 1967 (age 59); Orange County, California, U.S.
- Occupations: Costume designer, Fashion Designer
- Years active: 1999–present

Mirela Rupic (born March 21, 1967) is an American costume and fashion designer. Her costume designing career took off after she was included in a minor TV series, which followed with her involvement in the movie Fight Club in 1999. She is also known for being the lead costume designer in the 2007 TV series Chuck.

== Biography ==
Rupic was born in Orange County, California. She studied fashion design at the Woodbury University in San Diego where she launched her first collection, presenting her personal style. By the age of 26, Rupic was already working as an assistant designer of Milena Canonero, on a dozen of projects.

== Career ==
Rupic ventured into the world of costume design for film and theater as an assistant designer of Milena Canonero. She came to fame through her work as an assistant costume designer on David Fincher's Fight Club. A turning point in her career came when William A. Elliott, the production designer with whom she had worked in Meet the Spartans, introduced her to the Australian film director and scriptwriter Alister Grierson. Rupic and Grierson worked together on several projects starting with Sanctum.

Throughout her career, she has collaborated with a number of colleagues, organizations and galleries. In 2016 she collaborated with RISD students from the costume and fashion design department, as part of an international fashion design workshop.

== Work ==
Rupic has been assistant or lead costume designer on over a dozen films and TV series to date.

Year	Title	Role	Notes
2014-2015	Chicago Fire	Costume Designer	17 Episodes
2013-2014	Inside Amy Schumer	Costume Designer	16 Episodes
2010-2012	Damages	Costume Designer	30 Episodes
2010-2011	Chuck	Costume Designer	23 Episodes
2006	Roscoe Village	Costume Designer	3 Episodes
2011	Sanctum	Costume Designer	
2010	La Rafle	Costume Designer	
2014	X-Men: Days of Future Past	Assistant Costume Designer	
2008	Meet the Spartans	Assistant Costume Designer	
1999	Fight Club	Assistant Costume Designer	
