= Downtown Magnets High School =

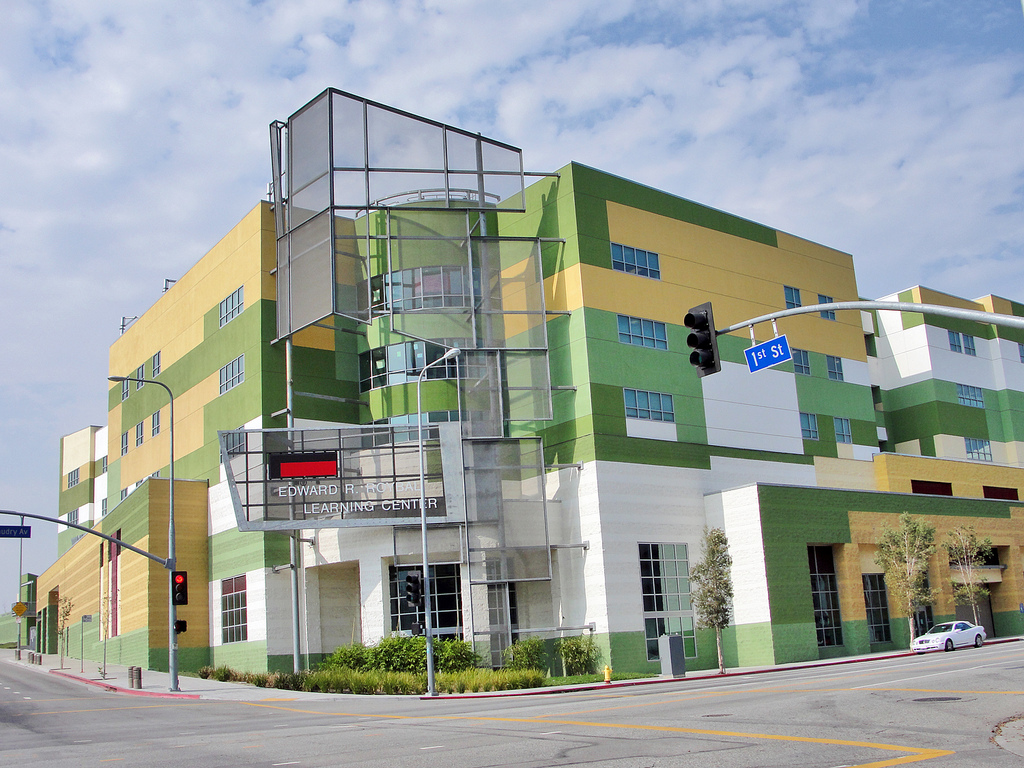
- The Edward R. Roybal Learning Center, where the school resides

Location
- 1200 Colton Street; Los Angeles, California 90026; United States; 34.06172974099776°N 118.25397860025885°W

Information
- Former name: Downtown Business Magnet; Downtown Business High
- Type: Magnet; public
- Motto: "Home of the Suns"
- Established: 1981
- School district: Los Angeles Unified School District
- NCES District ID: 0622710
- NCES School ID: 062271007757
- Principal: Sean Teer
- Teaching staff: 45.51 (on an FTE basis)
- Grades: 9–12
- Gender: Coeducational
- Enrollment: 819 (2024–2025)
  - Grade 9: 228
  - Grade 10: 217
  - Grade 11: 202
  - Grade 12: 172
- Student to teacher ratio: 18.00 (2024–2025)
- Schedule type: Block scheduling
- Colors: Green; Gold
- Athletics conference: CIF Los Angeles City Section
- Mascot: Sun
- Accreditations: WASC, IBO
- USNWR ranking: 194 (national)
- Publication: The Sunrise Press (2022–present)
- Newspaper: The Helios (2016–present)
- Website: www.downtownmagnets.org

Downtown Magnets High School (DMHS) is an alternate magnet high school located in the Temple-Beaudry neighborhood near Downtown Los Angeles. The school belongs to the Downtown/MacArthur Park Community of Schools and houses three magnet programs: Business (DBM), and Electronic Information (EIM), and the International Baccalaureate (IB). The three magnets combined hold a total student population of approximately 1,000 students.

Previously sharing a campus with the television station KLCS on West Temple Street, the school relocated to the Edward R. Roybal Learning Center beginning of the 2022–2023 year.

== History ==
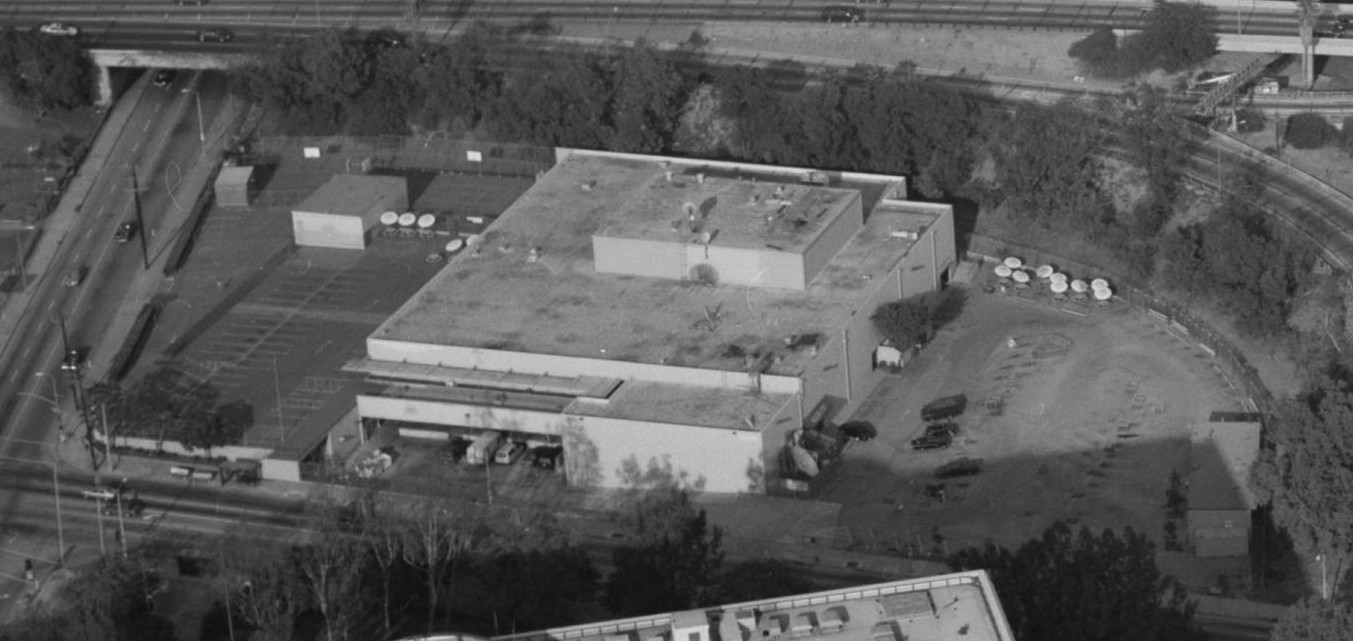
Aerial view of the former campus in 1999

After founding the Los Angeles Center for Enriched Studies in 1977, David Peha founded Downtown Business Magnet in 1981 as a component of LAUSD's expanding voluntary integration program specializing in bushiness training. The school's first class consisted of 55 sophomores from different neighborhoods around Downtown Los Angeles. The first campus was previously a storage room for the textbooks used by LAUSD and shared the area with television station KLCS; before that the area previously being used by Custer Avenue School that was demolished in 1949 to make way for U.S. Route 101. The school was focused on introducing a business program into the curriculum and mimicking a business environment.

In 1994, the Electronic Information Magnet was created for specialization in technology and multimedia. Because of the new magnet, Downtown Business Magnet adopted the name Downtown Magnets to incorporate both.

On June 6, 2022, the school announced that it would be relocating to another campus after 40 years. They moved to the Edward R. Roybal Learning Center in the summer before the 2022–2023 school year.

== Academics and programs ==
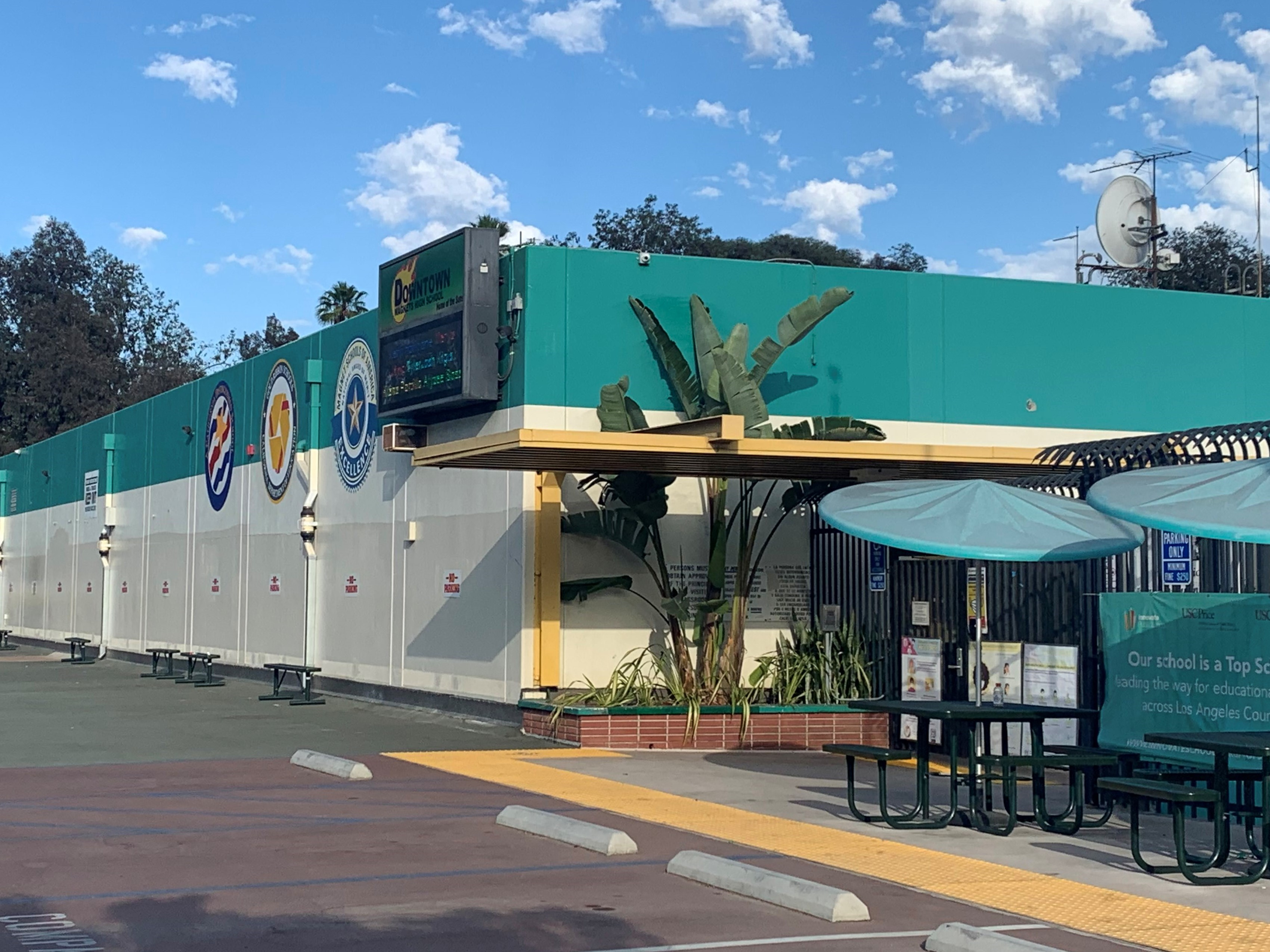
Upper gate at the former campus, 2021

=== Downtown Business Magnet ===
The Downtown Business Magnet was the first magnet program established at DMHS, and is the largest magnet program, with approximately 45% of the school's population. The curriculum includes accounting, business organization, corporate management, sales, entrepreneurship, careers, international relations, and the use of technology in business. It includes the Academy of Finance and the Academy of Fashion Design & Merchandising.

The Academy of Fashion Design & Merchandising was established in 1992 under as the Fashion Careers Center to educate students on the design and fabrication of general clothing apparel. In 2014, the Fashion Careers Center was combined along with the existing Academy of Finance of DBM. It was renamed the "Academy of Fashion" in 2015, and then to "Academy of Fashion Design & Merchandising" in 2017.

=== Electronic Information Magnet ===
The Electronic Information Magnet was established in 1994. It has the second largest student population out of the three magnet programs and includes studies in computer science, computer programming and web design. The magnet program was developed with the Los Angeles Central Library and the UCLA Graduate School of Education in collaboration with several local business leaders and LAUSD board members. The program incorporates technology and STEM into students' high school education.

=== International Baccalaureate ===
DMHS is a part of the International Baccalaureate diploma program, being authorized for the program on October 8, 2014.

=== Grings College Center ===
The Grings College Center was founded to assist students for college by helping with applications, financial aid, and scholarships. Previously known as simply the College Center, it was renamed in 2005 to honor Carol Grings, a college counselor who also served as a math teacher, and coordinator for DMHS from 1982 until 2005, when she died from cancer.

In the 2021–2022 school year, the Los Angeles Times ran a story about the Center and the college counselor, Lynda McGee, and how they helped students from the school rival the college admissions rate of elite private schools.

== Athletics ==
The school participates in sports such as basketball, cross country, softball, baseball, tennis, volleyball, and track and field. Prior to the campus relocation, as they did not have a large enough room for classes, physical education classes would regularly be at school, Elysian Park, Echo Park Lake, or Griffith Park.

In 2012, the boys and girls' tennis teams were introduced, and in the next year, the girls' tennis team won the school's first championship over El Camino Real Charter High School.

== Demographics and rankings ==
Demographics of student body
| Breakdown | 2019 | 2020 | 2021 |
|---|---|---|---|
| Native Americans | <1% | <1% | <1% |
| Hispanic and Latino American | 56% | 58.4% | 55.7% |
| Black | 6% | 5.4% | 5.5% |
| Asian American | 32% | 33.9% | 33.8% |
| Native Hawaiian or other Pacific Islander | <1% | <1% | <1% |
| White | 4% | 1.8% | 2.9% |
| Multiracial Americans | – | 1.8% | 1.7% |
| Female | 47% | 49.1% | 49% |
| Male | 53% | 50.9% | 51% |

For the 2019-2020 school year, DMHS had an enrollment of 1056 students, broken down into 25% freshmen, 27.3% sophomores, 25.4% juniors, and 22.3% seniors. 71.2% of students had English as their second language. 2% were English learners. The school had 83.6% of enrolled students economically disadvantaged in the 2012–2013 school year.

As of 2022, DMHS is ranked 24th in California and 194th nationally according to the U.S. News & World Report. In 2014, the school placed 25th out of 75 in Los Angeles's Challenge Index. In 2015, it placed 84th out of the top 100 on the U.S. News & World Report list.

US News 2022 Rankings

- 2 in Los Angeles Unified School District High Schools
- 8 in Los Angeles metropolitan area High Schools
- 24in California High Schools
- 194 in National Rankings

Academic Performance Index

The Academic Performance Index (API) measures the academic progress of schools across the state of California. Since the 2007-2008 school year, Downtown Magnets has placed number one in Local District 4, thanks to the continual growth of its API Its scores are as follows:

| Year | 2012 | 2011 | 2009 | 2008 | 2007 | 2005 | 2004 | 2003 | 2002 | 2001 | 2000 | 1999 |
| API | 826 | 807 | 746 | 736 | 690 | 655 | 645 | 616 | 606 | 601 | 593 | 595 |

The aforementioned data is provided by the California Department of Education.

== Notable people ==
=== Alumni ===
- Brittany Diego – fashion stylist and founder of Fashion Mentor
- Stephanie Dorsey – co-founder and managing partner of E²JDJ
- Phlo Finister – R&B singer-songwriter (attended, did not graduate)
- Joshua Hong – vocalist for the South Korean boy band Seventeen
- Hayley Hoverter – founder of Sweet (dis)SOLVE and winner of the 2011 National Youth Entrepreneurship Challenge by NFTE

=== Staff ===
- Daniel Jocz – former social studies teacher, 2016 National Teacher of the Year finalist, and 2016 California Teacher of the Year winner
