= OC Channel =

- Huntington Beach, California; United States
- Channels: Digital: KOCE 50.2

Programming
- Affiliations: PBS

Ownership
- Owner: KOCE-TV, Chapman University

History
- Founded: 2007

Links
- Website: www.occhannel.org

OC Channel was an over-the-air, digital broadcast, television news network. The channel is broadcast on a digital sub channel of PBS member station KOCE in Huntington Beach, California. This service is no longer in operation as a secondary lineup of PBS programming is currently carried on channel 50.2, as of May 2017.

== History and programming ==
OC Channel began broadcasting on KOCE's digital sub-channel in 2007. The channel was produced in a partnership between KOCE and Chapman University and secondary partners Cox Communications, Time Warner Cable, and Verizon FIOS, with programming consisting of Orange County news, local events information, weather and traffic. The channel's format consisted of an L-frame shaped area on the screen, which featured live traffic cameras from Caltrans, current temperature/time and a news headlines crawl on the bottom of the screen. The remaining and larger portion of the screen provided viewers with local public affairs/news programs and documentaries. The channel could be viewed in Orange County, Los Angeles County, Ventura County and portions of San Bernardino County & Riverside County to viewers able to receive digital broadcasts. The channel was also available on Cox Communications in Orange County.

== See also ==
- KOCE
