= Annie Chu =

Chinese-American architect

- Born: Hong Kong, c.1960
- Education: Columbia University, M.S. Building Design, (1988-1989)
- Occupation: Architect
- Practice: Architect, interior designer and educator
- Buildings: MOCA, Hammer Museum, The Huntington, Autry Museum of the American West, Studio Museum in Harlem, Southern California Public Radio, Los Angeles Philharmonic Association
- Projects: Founding principal of the Chu-Gooding

Annie Chu is a Chinese-American architect, interior designer, and academic. She was a founding principal of the Chu-Gooding architecture firm in Los Angeles.

== Early life and education ==
Annie Chu was born in Hong Kong around 1960. At the age of 16, she relocated to the United States.

Chu received her Bachelor's degree in Architecture from SCI-Arc and a Master of Science in Building Science from Columbia University.

== Career ==
Her early career includes working with Tod Williams Billie Tsien Architects. She is the founding principal of the Los Angeles-based design firm Chu-Gooding. Her work encompasses exhibition designs and architectural projects for institutions such as Museum of Contemporary Art (MOCA), Hammer Museum, Getty Center, the Huntington Library, Autry Museum of the American West, Studio Museum in Harlem and Los Angeles Philharmonic Association. She has taught at the University of Southern California School of Architecture, and has been an educator for over 30 years.

She is a professor of interior architecture at Woodbury University.

== Recognition ==
Chu fuses art and design in her work as an architect. As an educator working across the U.S. and abroad, Chu was recognized as a 2016 Presidential Honoree of the Los Angeles chapter of the American Institute of Architects (AIA) Distinguished Educator Award. Chu was later appointed Vice President of the International Interior Design Association (IIDA) Board of Directors.

Chu is a Fellow of the American Institute of Architects. She is the co-principal with Rick Gooding and partner to Michael Matteucci at Chu + Gooding Architects, a Los Angeles-based design firm.
