= Stephanie Thomas (fashion designer) =

American disability activist

Stephanie Thomas (born in Chicago, Illinois) is an American disability fashion stylist, public speaker, voice actor, and professor.

According to People magazine, while she was working at a radio station, WVKL-FM (95.7), in Norfolk, Virginia, Thomas wore pajamas for a year as part of the "PJ Deejay" campaign and discussed the limited clothing options for people with physical disabilities on-air every day. Thomas noted that she felt isolated by the stress of going out in public dressed in pajamas.

Thomas has worked in disability fashion styling for 30 years, developing and trademarking the Disability Fashion Styling System, which has been featured by Vogue, The Guardian, Refinery29, Highsnobiety, Paper and The New Yorker.

== Early life and education ==
Thomas is a congenital amputee who has no right thumb and is missing three toes. In a TEDx talk, she said she was not expected to be able to walk. Thomas graduated from high school in 1987 and studied for a Master of Arts in fashion journalism at Academy of Art University.

== Career ==
In an interview with The Guardian, Thomas said she noticed in 2006 that "we have more clothing in stores for dogs than we do for people with disabilities". Between 1992 and 2003, Thomas researched disability fashion and trademarked her Disability Fashion Styling System, which she established in 2004.

Thomas has worked as a voice actor and jingle singer since 1997. She has recorded voiceovers for Disney, Hilton, Macy's, Toyota, Martini and Rossi, McDonald's, and Netflix.

Thomas is also an adjunct professor at Woodbury University in Burbank, California, where she teaches fashion marketing.

In 2010, Thomas launched a blog about disability fashion that has become a business. Thomas also hosts a podcast on disability issues.

To mark the 75th anniversary of Disability Employment Awareness Month and Dwarfism Awareness Month in October 2020, Thomas produced and hosted a two-day online event called "The Power of Personal Style". Speakers included Jameela Jamil.

=== Notable work ===
Thomas regularly works with 2019 Independent Spirit Awards–nominated actor and disability influencer Lauren "Lolo" Spencer, who has ALS. Spencer has modeled for Tommy Hilfiger adaptive, and was styled by Thomas for the Give Me Liberty film premiere at the Sundance and the film's screening at the Cannes Film Festival in 2019.

== Honors ==
In 2016, Thomas spoke on "Dressing with Disabilities" at Canada's third-largest TEDx event. In 2018, Thomas was recognized as a Distinguished Alumni Award Recipient by Academy of Art University. In 2019, the Business of Fashion website included Thomas on its "BoF 500" list of "People Shaping the Global Fashion Industry".

In 2020, Thomas received an Ed Roberts Award for her work as a disability fashion styling expert, and as founder and CEO of Cur8able, a business dedicated to fashion for people with disabilities.

== See also ==
- Fashion in the United States
