= Lola Abiola-Edewor =

Nigerian politician

- Born: May 10, 1961 (age 64)
- Occupation: Politician
- Father: Moshood Abiola

Lola Abiola-Edewor (born May 10, 1961) is a Nigerian politician from Ogun state. She is the first daughter of late Moshood Abiola.

== Education ==
She holds a B.Sc in accounting from the American University London and MBA in marketing from Woodsbury University, California.

== Career ==
She worked with Crescent high insurance brokers from 1990 to 1999

Abiola-Edewor represented Lagos Apapa federal constituency in the national assembly for two terms from 1999 to 2007, first under the platform of Alliance for Democracy for four years then under the Peoples Democratic Party for another four years.

She served as Executive Director National deposit insurance corporation (NDIC) for two terms, confirmation for her second and final five year term by the Senate , came in 2019.
