= KOCE-TV =

Television station in Huntington Beach, California

- Logo used since February 6, 2024 (Note: The PBS logo has been in use since November 4, 2019, and the "SoCal" portion has been in use since January 2021.)

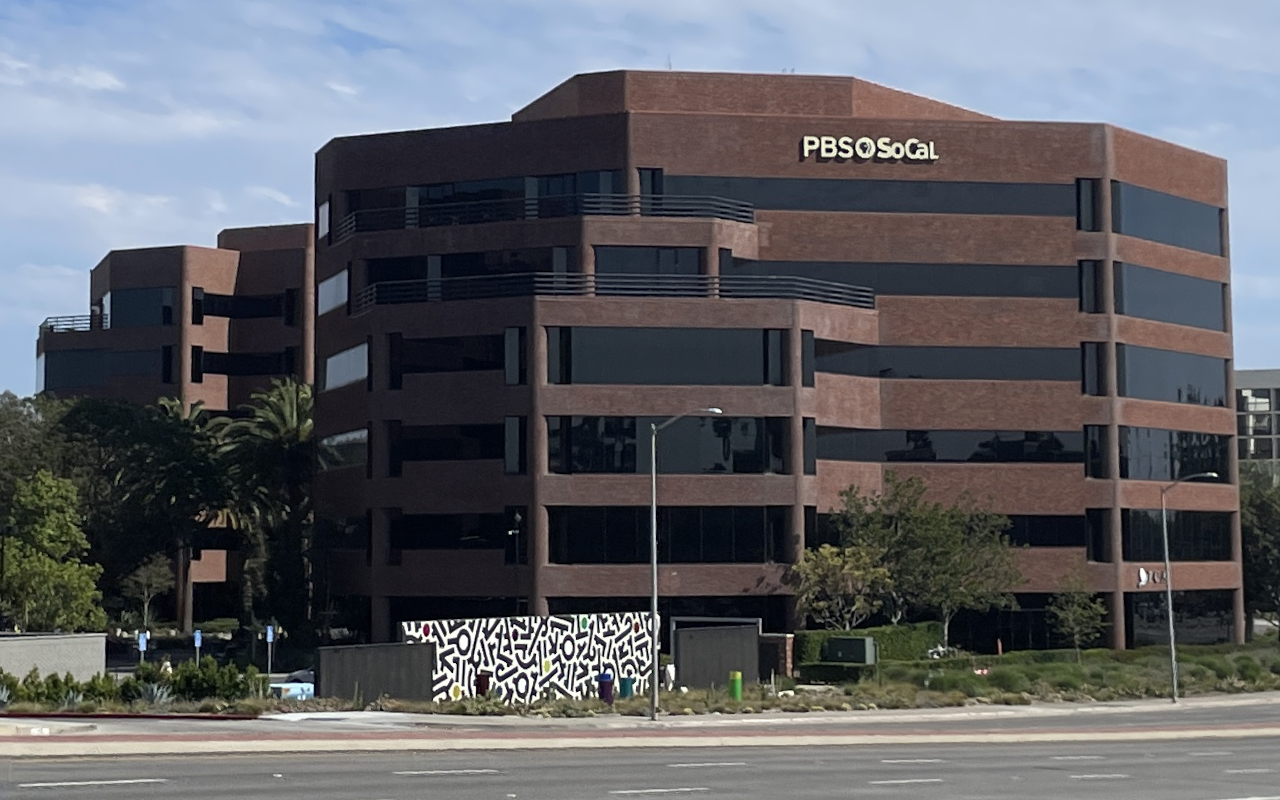
- Huntington Beach–Los Angeles, California; United States
- City: Huntington Beach, California
- Channels: Digital: 18 (UHF), shared with KSCI; Virtual: 50
- Branding: PBS SoCal

Programming
- Affiliations: 50.1: PBS; for others, see § Subchannels

Ownership
- Owner: Public Media Group of Southern California
- Sister stations: KCET

History
- First air date: November 20, 1972
- Former channel numbers: Analog: 50 (UHF, 1972–2009); Digital: 48 (UHF, 2001–2018)
- Call sign meaning: "Orange County Education"

Technical information
- Licensing authority: FCC
- Facility ID: 4328
- ERP: 700 kW
- HAAT: 899 m (2,949 ft)
- Transmitter coordinates: 34°12′47.9″N 118°3′44.3″W
- Translator(s): see § Translators

Links
- Public license information: Public file; LMS
- Website: pbssocal.org

KOCE-TV (channel 50), is a PBS member television station licensed to Huntington Beach, California, United States, serving the Los Angeles area. It is owned by the Public Media Group of Southern California alongside the market's secondary PBS member, KCET (channel 28). The two stations share studios at The Pointe (on West Alameda Avenue and Bob Hope Drive, between The Burbank Studios and Walt Disney Studios complexes) in Burbank; KOCE-TV maintains a secondary studio at the South Coast Corporate Center (in the South Coast Metro area) in Costa Mesa and shares transmitter facilities with KSCI (channel 18) atop Mount Wilson. Since 2011, the station has been branded as PBS SoCal.

KOCE-TV and KCET are two of four PBS member stations serving Greater Los Angeles (the others being San Bernardino–based KVCR-DT [channel 24], which mainly serves the Inland Empire, and the Los Angeles Unified School District–run KLCS [channel 58]).

== History ==
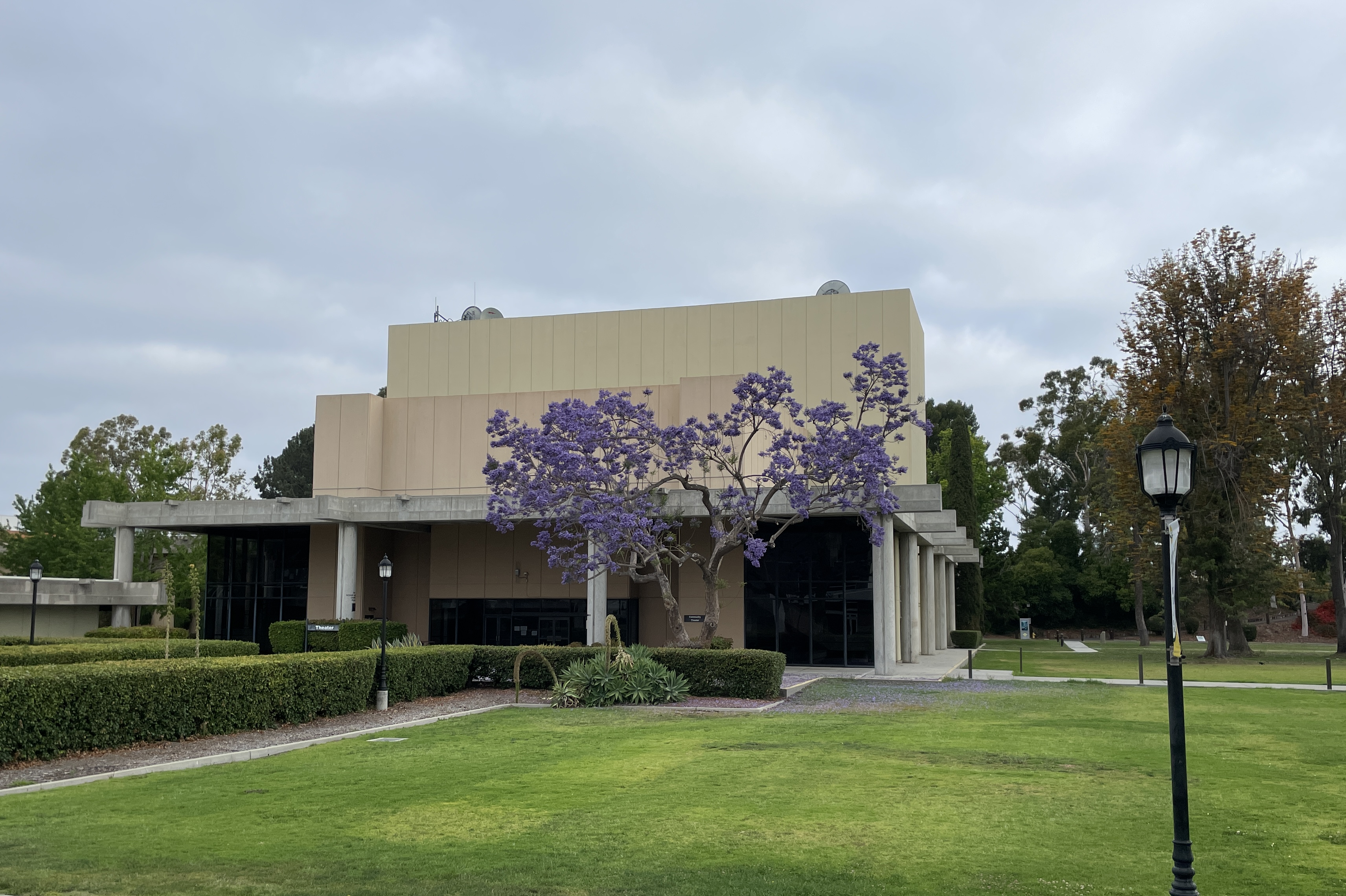
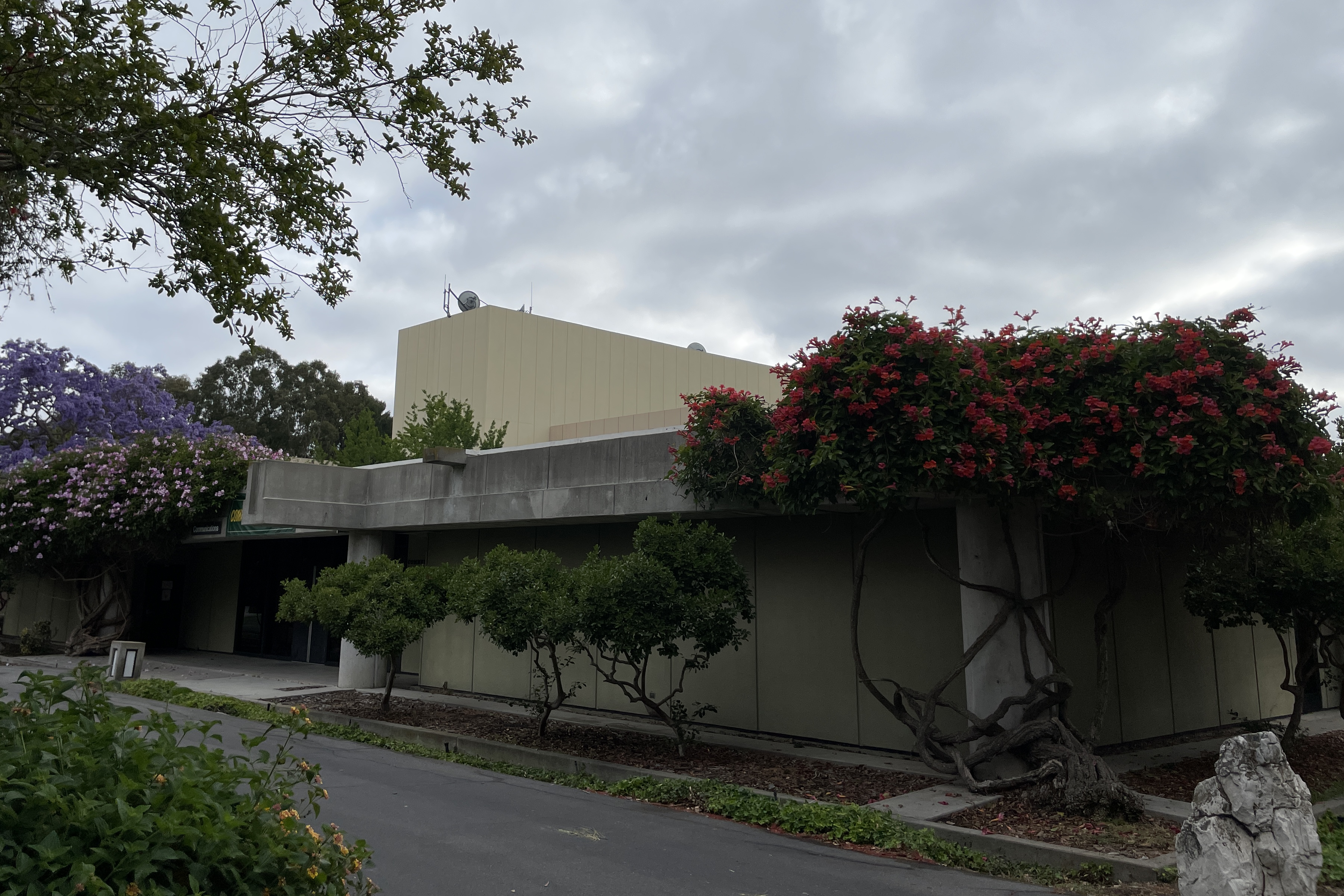
Former station headquarters of KOCE-TV at Golden West College in Huntington Beach, California, pictured in 2022

The station first signed on the air on November 20, 1972, as the first television station licensed to Orange County, initially airing four hours of programming per day. It broadcast its first telecourse in 1973. It was originally owned by the Coast Community College District. The station was originally based from studios at Golden West College in Huntington Beach. For most of its history, KOCE-TV was a "beta" or secondary PBS station, airing only 25 percent of the national PBS schedule.

=== KOCE-TV Foundation vs. Daystar ===
In 2002, the Coast Community College District offered KOCE for sale to raise revenue for other programs. A bidding war ensued between the religious broadcaster Daystar Television Network and members of the community who wanted to continue membership with PBS. In 2004, the station was sold to the KOCE-TV Foundation, an organization made up of civic and business leaders who wanted to keep KOCE-TV as an educational station, for $25.5 million, reduced from an initial bid of $32 million (with $8 million paid up front and the rest paid in 25 equal installments without interest beginning in 2009). The foundation outbid Daystar by $500,000; the religious broadcaster placed a bid of $25 million, which it intended to compensate in an all-cash payment.

Daystar sued in state court, stating that under the terms of the auction, its all-cash bid should have been accepted. A lower court ruled in favor of the college district and the foundation; but on June 23, 2005, the California Court of Appeals ruled that the sale of KOCE-TV was illegal, since the offer was modified after the end of bidding and because the value of the bid was not expressed in net present value terms. Both sides appealed this decision. On November 22, 2005, a state appeals panel reheard arguments in the case following a petition from KOCE, the KOCE Foundation, the Coast Community College District, and Daystar. On May 25, 2006, the appeals court reaffirmed its decision, again ruling the sale illegal.

At the same time, Daystar also filed a federal lawsuit, alleging religious discrimination, civil rights violations, and racketeering. On May 1, 2006, the District Court dismissed the racketeering claim, but not the civil rights portion of the lawsuit.

In June 2006, a state assembly bill that had previously been approved was changed to allow the Coast Community College District to sell KOCE below fair market value to keep it a PBS station. The new bill was passed by the assembly, but Governor Arnold Schwarzenegger vetoed it, citing concerns about serving the public interest in the sale of public property and the unresolved legal challenges to the type of sale that the bill would have authorized.

In June 2007, an agreement was reached in which the KOCE-TV Foundation would keep the station, provided that Daystar would be allowed to broadcast over one of KOCE's digital subchannels. As a result, KOCE-DT3 is reserved to broadcast Daystar's national schedule without any local deviation.

=== OC Channel ===
In 2007, KOCE and Chapman University launched OC Channel, an Orange County-focused news channel.

=== Becoming Los Angeles' primary PBS station ===
KOCE became the Los Angeles market's primary PBS station on January 1, 2011, when the area's longtime original primary member station of the network, KCET (channel 28), ended its association with PBS after 40 years due to an increase in costs to carry PBS programming—leading to its switch to an independent public television station.

After KCET left PBS, KOCE entered into a broadcast agreement with KLCS and KVCR to form "PBS SoCal" effective January 1, 2011. The PBS programming originally carried on KCET is now shared between the three stations. As a consequence, on December 31, 2010, KOCE expanded its cable coverage into Santa Barbara, and later expanded to Palm Springs. Both San Luis Obispo and Santa Maria (who were previously served by KCET), however, were not included in the cable coverage, as those communities are now served by San Francisco PBS member KQED via cable (Palm Springs is also served by KVCR-DT, while Bakersfield, which was also served by KCET, is now served via cable and over-the-air through Fresno PBS member KVPT).

In the spring of 2011, KOCE moved its administrative offices to a modern facility in Costa Mesa.

KOCE was available in the Palm Springs area and the Coachella Valley on cable and over the air since the late 1990s, formerly on K55FI and later K35LA, now a KCET translator since 2011, when KOCE became the major PBS station for Southern California.

=== Public Media Group of Southern California ===
The logo of PBS SoCal KOCE before changing to magenta color in 2024.

On April 25, 2018, KCETLink Media Group and the KOCE-TV Foundation announced that they would merge, effective by the end of the first half of 2018. KOCE remains Los Angeles' primary PBS station but relocated its operations to KCET's facility in Burbank (maintaining its Costa Mesa location as a secondary facility). The two stations continue to carry their existing programming, but KCET returned to PBS. The merger was completed on October 1, 2018, with the combined company branded as Public Media Group of Southern California.

In January 2024, PBS SoCal announced plans to rebrand KCET as PBS SoCal Plus starting on February 6.

== Programming ==
In addition to PBS programs, KOCE features programming focused on the communities of Orange County. It also broadcasts several college telecourses by the Coast Community College District, which was the station's original owner. Programming produced by KOCE includes Variety Studio: Actors on Actors.

=== News operation ===
KOCE produced and broadcast the only Orange County-focused nightly newscast in the Los Angeles market, Real Orange, with a concentration on human interest and public service stories. The program was co-anchored by former longtime KTLA (channel 5) news/sports anchor Ed Arnold, and Ann Pulice. KOCE partnered with the Orange County Register for newsgathering resources for the station's newscasts, the newspaper also served as a sponsor for the program. The program aired five nights a week until 2009, when only two episodes a week were produced (with rebroadcasts the other three weeknights). The program ended in 2013 due to funding constraints.

KOCE also operated a Weather Center stationed in La Habra Heights, located about 20 miles (32 km) north of the Huntington Beach studios. This weather station, which only consists of a weather camera, was shown live during the weather segments of Real Orange on Monday, Wednesday and Friday evenings. Weather radar imagery and other forecast data were gathered from other weather sources (such as the National Weather Service), as KOCE did not employ its own weather radar.

== Technical information ==
Subchannels of KSCI and KOCE-TV
License	Subchannel	Res.	Short name	Programming
KSCI	18.1	720p	LA18	Shop LC
KSCI	18.2	480i	SBS	SBS (Korean)
KSCI	18.3	480i	MBCD	MBC-D (Korean)
KSCI	18.4	480i	YTV	Yonhap News TV (Korean news)
KOCE-TV	50.1	1080i	PBS-HD	PBS
KOCE-TV	50.2	480i	PBS-2	PBS SoCal Encore
KOCE-TV	50.3	480i	Daystar	Daystar
KOCE-TV	50.4	480i	PBSwrld	World
KOCE-TV	50.5	480i	PBSkids	PBS Kids

On January 1, 2011, World Channel moved from KCET-DT4 to KOCE-DT4.

=== Analog-to-digital conversion ===
KOCE-TV shut down its analog signal, over UHF channel 50, at 11:30 p.m. on June 12, 2009, as part of the federally mandated transition from analog to digital television. The station's digital signal remained on its pre-transition UHF channel 48, using virtual channel 50.

=== Spectrum reallocation ===
On April 13, 2017, KOCE-TV announced it had sold its over-the-air spectrum in the FCC's spectrum reallocation auction, reaping $49 million, which the station said it would use to invest in programming and other services. As a result of its spectrum sale, KOCE-TV entered into a channel sharing arrangement with multicultural independent station KSCI (channel 18). KOCE completed the move to UHF 18 on the morning of June 19, 2018, with all five programming streams appearing in the virtual channel table with the same numbering.

=== Translators ===
- KODG-LD 17 Palm Springs
- KBAB-LD 50 Santa Barbara

== See also ==
- Maria Hall-Brown
