= List of California women architects =

The following is a list of women architects in California by region – notable women who are well known for their work in the field of architecture, landscape architecture, urban design, and preservation.

== Northern California ==
Northern California includes San Jose, San Francisco, Oakland, Sacramento, and Metropolitan Fresno.

- Helen Findlay Aycrigg
- Esther Baum Born
- Elizabeth Boyter
- Lilian Bridgman
- Ella Castelhun
- Louise Clever
- Edna Deakin
- Audrey Durland Emmons
- Anne Fougeron
- Helen French
- Arabelle Hufbauer
- Vera Jansone
- Grace Jewett
- Lois Kartwold
- Michelle Kaufmann
- Evelyn Kosmak
- Katherine Lambert
- Lois Wilson Langhorst
- Roslyn Lindheim
- Julia Morgan
- Gertrude Comfort Morrow
- Hilde Reiss
- Sally Bould Stan
- Rebecca Wood Esherick Watkin
- Beverly Willis

== Southern California ==
Southern California can include the counties of Imperial, Kern, Los Angeles, Orange, Riverside, San Bernardino, San Diego, San Luis Obispo, Santa Barbara, and Ventura.

- Katherine Bashford
- Barbara Bestor
- Ingalill Wahlroos-Ritter
- Cory Buckner
- Jeanine Centuori
- Olive K. Chadeayne
- Annie Chu
- Mary Colter
- Isabelle Duvuvier
- Ray Eames
- Dora Epstein-Jones
- Greta Grossman
- Helen Liu Fong
- Mia Lehrer
- Mehrnoosh Mojallali
- Edith Northman
- Iris Anna Regn
- Lilian Rice
- Lutah Maria Riggs
- Ruth Shellhorn
- Paulette Singley
- Norma Merrick Sklarek
- Hazel Wood
- Florence Yoch
- Liane Zimbler
- Anne Zimmerman
- Jennifer Siegal
- Julie Eizenberg
