= Association for Women in Architecture + Design =

American women's professional association for architecture

- Founded: 1915; 111 years ago Washington University in St. Louis
- Type: Professional
- Affiliation: Independent
- Status: Active
- Emphasis: Architecture
- Scope: National
- Colors: Until 2012, Blue and Gold
- Chapters: 1 national, 11 chartered
- Former name: Alpha Alpha Gamma
- Headquarters: 2807 Oregon Court, Unit F 6/7; Torrance, California 90503; United States
- Website: www.awaplusd.org

The Association for Women in Architecture + Design is a nonprofit professional association based in Los Angeles, California. The organization aims to support women working in the fields of architecture and design through educational programming, networking, and mentoring. The history the association dates back to a Alpha Alpha Gamma, a collegiate organization established at Washington University in St. Louis.

== History ==
=== Alpha Alpha Gamma ===
In 1915 four female architect students from Washington University in St. Louis were rejected from the male architectural fraternity. These women, Helen Milius, Henrietta May Steinmesch, Jane Pelton, and Angela Burdeau created an architectural sorority called La Confrerie Alongine. La Confrerie Alongine later became Alpha Alpha Gamma. The four found started other chapters of Alpha Alpha Gamma. On January 28, 1922, Alpha Alpha Gamma became an official national sorority supporting female architectural students. Starting in 1924, it established professional chapters for graduates in the field.

The name Alpha Alpha Gamma was chosen from the first letters of the greek phrase meaning "Advancement in Architecture Among women"

=== Association of Women in Architecture ===
In 1948 at a convention in San Francisco, Alpha Alpha Gamma voted to name its professional chapters the Association for Women in Architecture and Allied Arts. This name change helped support women in the fields of architecture, interior design, and engineering and artists of various principles.

By 1950, there were around twenty professional and student chapters across the United States. The association published a newsletter called Keystone and held a national annual convention. Because of the pressure of conventions and keeping a newsletter, the national organization ultimately decided to dissolve in 1964. Though both student and professional chapters continued to operate as location organizations in universities and cities across the United States.

=== Association for Women in Architecture + Design ===
The Los Angeles chapter soon became the sole survivor of AWA, calling itself AWA-LA. In 1975, AWA-LA expanded its membership to include others interested in supporting women. This expansion in membership included men, thus the "of women" portion of the name was changed to "for women" to represent the introduction of men into the organization with the ideal to support women in the profession.

In 2012, AWA-LA changed its name to the Association for Women in Architecture + Design to support architects, contractors, interior designers, engineers, urban planners, designers, and artists in similar fields and students of these fields. The Association for Women in Architecture + Design is a not-for-profit organization.

The organization's archives are held at the University Libraries at Virginia Tech in the International Archive of Women in Architecture (IAWA).

== Symbols ==
The colors of Alpha Alpha Gamma were blue and gold. Its publication was The Keystone.

== Chapters ==
=== Alpha Alpha Gamma chapters ===
The collegiate chapters of Alpha Alpha Gamma included:

| Chapter | Charter date | Institution | Location | Statues | Ref. |
|---|---|---|---|---|---|
| Alpha | 1922 | Washington University in St. Louis | St. Louis, Missouri | Inactive | |
| Beta | 1922 | University of Minnesota | Minneapolis Minnesota | Inactive | |
| Gamma | 1922 | University of Texas | Austin, Texas | Inactive | |
| Delta | 1922 | University of California, Berkeley | Berkeley, California | Inactive | |
| Epsilon | 1925 | University of Illinois | Champaign, Illinois | Inactive | |
| Zeta | 1928 | University of Michigan | Ann Arbor, Michigan | Inactive | |
| Eta | 1935 | Cornell University | Ithaca, New York | Inactive | |
| Theta | 1950 | Kansas State University | Manhattan, Kansas | Inactive | |
| Iota | 1956 | Auburn University | Auburn, Alabama | Inactive | |
| Kappa | 1957 | University of California, Los Angeles | Los Angeles, California | Inactive | |
| Lambda | 1966 | University of Kansas | Lawrence, Kansas | Inactive | |

== Notable members ==
- Georgia Louise Harris Brown, architect
- Jeanine Centuori, architect
- Rose Connor, architect
- Wanda Dalla Costa, architect and professor
- Katherine Diamond, architect
- Elsa Leviseur, landscape architect
- Eleanor Pepper, interior designer
- Dimity Reed, architect and academic
- Norma Sklarek, architect
- Henrietta May Steinmesch, architect and association co-founder
- Virginia Tanzmann, architect
- Silja Tillner, architect
- Liane Zimbler, architect
