= Lake Street Fire Station =

- U.S. National Register of Historic Places
- U.S. Historic district – Contributing property
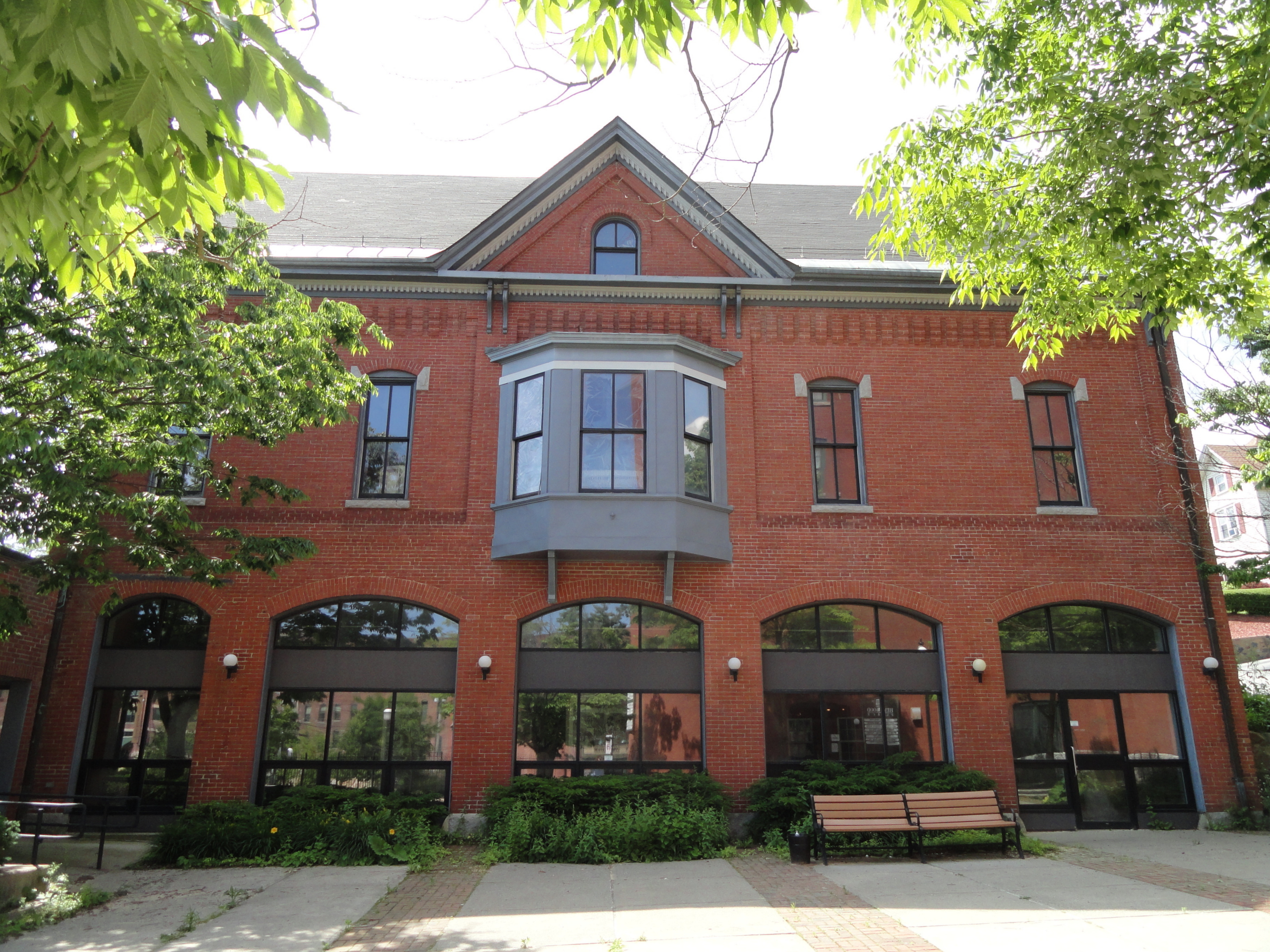

- Location within Massachusetts Location within the United States
- Location: 2 Lake Street, Gardner, Massachusetts
- Coordinates: 42°34′37″N 71°59′42″W
- Built: 1884
- Architectural style: Italianate
- Part of: West Gardner Square Historic District (ID85003185)
- NRHP reference No.: 80001676

Significant dates
- Added to NRHP: March 25, 1980
- Designated CP: December 30, 1985

The Lake Street Fire Station is an historic fire station in Gardner, Massachusetts. Built in 1884 to house a school and a fire company, it served as a school for just a few years, and as a fire station until the 1980s. It is architecturally distinguished as a good local example of late Victorian architecture. The building was listed on the National Register of Historic Places in 1980, and included in the West Gardner Square Historic District in 1985.

== Description and history ==
The former Lake Street Fire Station is located in downtown Gardner, occupying a parcel of land between Richmond and Central Streets, facing east toward a plaza that was once part of Lake Street, and the former Heywood-Wakefield Company Complex. It is a 2-1/2 story masonry structure, built out of red brick and covered by a gabled roof. Its ground floor main facade has four former equipment bays, now filled with large multipane windows and the building's current main entrance, and a former pedestrian entrance at the left. Each of these openings has a segmented-arch top, formed out of soldier bricks. The center bay has a projecting wood-frame oriel window, with a gable in the roof line above. The flanking windows are narrower, with segmented-arch openings that have shoulders and lintels of stone, and arches of soldier bricks.

The fire station was built in 1884, and originally housed a school on the second floor, which moved out in 1890. It also had a small lockup in the basement, which was later converted to a boiler room. The station originally had four bays for firetrucks, and a tower for drying hoses. The tower has been removed, and a modern addition added three truck bays to its left side (now housing the local visitors center).

== See also ==
- National Register of Historic Places listings in Worcester County, Massachusetts
