= Rose Connor =

American architect

- Rose Connor in 1948
- Born: March 4, 1892; Des Moines, Iowa
- Died: December 29, 1970 (aged 78); Claremont, California
- Occupation: Architect
- Years active: 1923 – 64

Rose Connor AIA (March 4, 1892 – December 29, 1970) was an American architect. Called "one of the earliest and most successful women architects of the 20th century", her architectural work was largely residential projects in Southern California, but she also did work for the U.S. military and Fuller Theological Seminary.

== Biography ==
Connor was born in Des Moines, Iowa in 1892. She was the daughter of William Connor and Eva Gatch. Her father was a lawyer and "prominent citizen and jurist" in Des Moines who had served in the American Civil War. He had been born in Ireland and came to the United States as a boy. She had three sisters, Elizabeth, Marjorie, and Dorothy. Connor's father died at age 58 when she was a child.

=== Education ===
Connor attended Des Moines public schools until eleventh grade and then continued her education abroad. She studied art & jewelry at the Académie Colarossi in Paris and attended the Birmingham School of Art in Birmingham, England. Connor then moved back to the U.S. and studied interior decoration at the Parsons School of Design (then known as New York School of Fine and Applied Art). She also attended Cooper Union.

Starting in 1923, Connor made her living as a drafter for a series of architects, including T. Beverly Keim in Los Angeles, Allen & Collens in Boston, Soule & Murphy in Santa Barbara, and Reginald D. Johnson, W. L. Risley and Allison & Allison, all in Los Angeles. During this period (from 1925 to 1930) she studied architecture at the Pasadena Atelier of the Beaux-Arts Institute of Design.

=== Career as an architect ===
Connor was licensed to practice architecture in California in 1936 and opened her own firm in Pasadena in October of that year. She became a member of the American Institute of Architects (AIA) in 1944. Her practice was mainly residential commissions for professional women. From 1946 to 1950 she also designed several small housing projects (from 16 to 74 houses) in Lakewood, Downey, and Anaheim.

The Rev. Charles E. Fuller was a major patron of Connor's work. He and his wife Grace commissioned eight separate houses from Connor for their own use or as rental properties at various times. Connor also worked as an associate architect with the firm of Orr, Strange & Inslee on the project to build Fuller Theological Seminary in 1953.

Connor suspended her practice from February 1942 to April 1946 due to World War II. During this time she worked for the United States Army Corps of Engineers working on camouflage and "other work."

Connor often employed the landscape architects Florence Yoch and Lucile Council on her projects. Another architect she worked with was John Byers with whom she designed an adobe house in San Gabriel in 1946.

=== Women in architecture ===
At the time Connor began her practice, women architects were rare. Connor was only the sixth woman to be admitted to AIA from California. In 1948 Connor was one of only 10 women architects in California who had their own firms, according to the Los Angeles Times. That same year, Architectural Record documented 1,119 women who had trained as architects but found that only 108 were actually practicing. The two-part article showcased the work of 18 of them, including Connor.

Connor was a member of Union Internationale des Femmes Architectes (UIFA) and was elected to the national board of Association for Women in Architecture in 1958. That year Connor researched the records of architects in all the U.S. states and found that at that time, there were only 320 women registered architects; there were seven states which had no women architects registered at all, and women represented about one percent of all the registered architects in the United States in her survey.

=== Personal life ===
Connor never married. She was involved in charitable groups outside architecture including the Pasadena chapter of Zonta International and was a charter member of the Women's City Club of Pasadena.

In 1964 Connor lost vision in her left eye due to temporal arteritis, and gave up her practice on the advice of her physicians. She moved to Claremont, California that year and became an emeritus member of AIA in 1965. She died on December 29, 1970, in Claremont and was buried in the family plot in Woodland Cemetery in her hometown of Des Moines.

The Art, Design & Architecture Museum has a collection of her drawings. The Schlesinger Library has papers related to UIFA donated by Connor.

== List of works ==
All of Connor's known architectural work was in California; here is a partial list:

- Beardsley House, Eagle Rock (1937)
- Hickman House, Los Angeles (1938)
- Ransome Beach House, Three Arch Bay (1938)
- Marshall Triplex, Los Angeles (1939)
- Grace Fuller Rental Houses, South Pasadena (1940)
- Caldwell House, Hollywood (1942)
- Marshall Duplex, Monterey (1946)
- Sturtevant House, Balboa (1947)
- Brown House, Laguna (1948)
- Brown-Mountain House, Seven Oaks (1950)
- Fuller House, Newport Beach (1950)
- Nightingale Mountain Cabin, Sky Forest (1952)
- Fuller House, San Marino (1952)
- Young Women's Christian Association (NRHP listed) (28 North Marengo Avenue, Pasadena) (1952, 1956) alterations
- Fuller Theological Seminary, Pasadena (1952-1953)

== See also ==
- Edith Northman, another early woman California architect
- Women in architecture
