= Heywood-Wakefield Company =

American furniture manufacturer

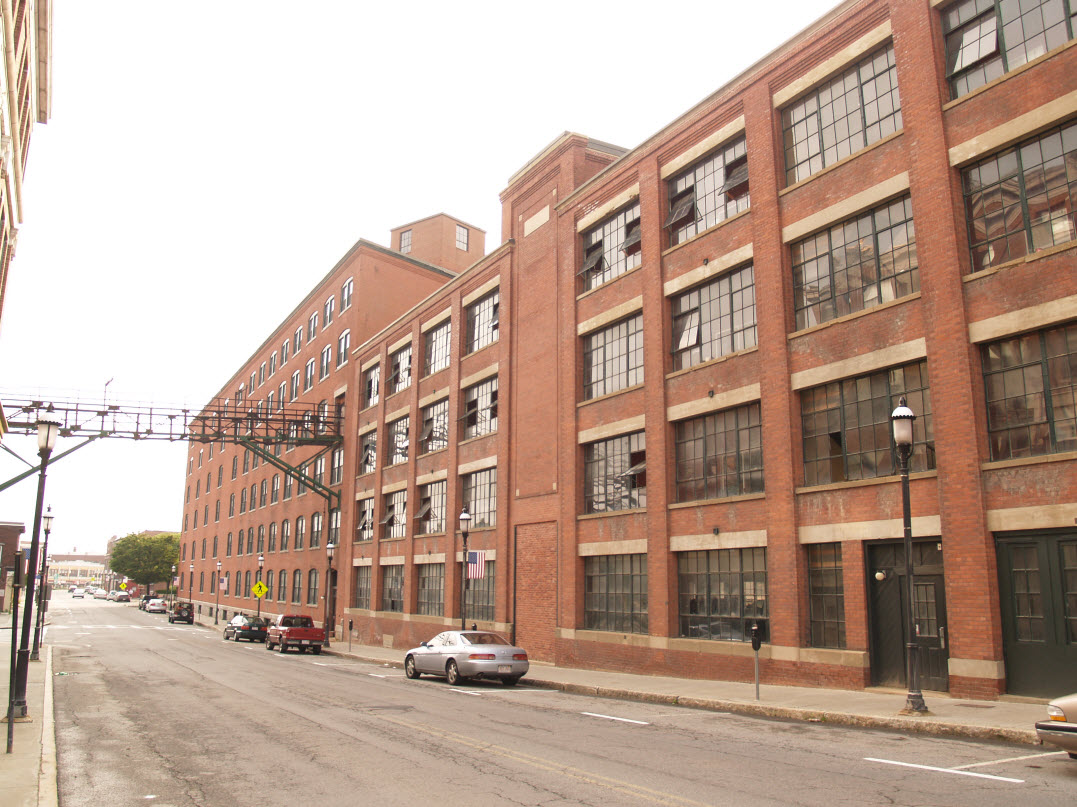
Heywood-Wakefield Company Complex at 206 Central Street in Gardner, Massachusetts

The Heywood-Wakefield Company is an American furniture manufacturer established in 1897. It went on to become a major presence in the US. Its older products are considered collectibles and have been featured on Antiques Roadshow.

== History ==
Heywood Brothers was established in 1826 and Wakefield Company was established in 1855. Both firms produced wicker and rattan furniture and, as these products became increasingly popular towards the end of the century, they became serious rivals. In 1897, the companies merged as Heywood Brothers & Wakefield Company (this name was changed to Heywood-Wakefield Company in 1921). The new company subsequently purchased Washburn-Heywood Chair Company in 1916, Oregon Chair Company in 1920, and Lloyd Manufacturing Company in 1921. Marshall Lloyd had developed a process for making woven furniture, such as wicker baby buggies.

As was the case for so many American manufacturers, Heywood-Wakefield succumbed to rising costs and competition from manufacturers abroad and was forced to shutter its operations in 1979. In 1982, Heywood-Wakefield sold the former Lloyd Manufacturing Company facilities to Flanders Industries. This company, now known as Lloyd Flanders, still makes outdoor furniture in Menominee, Michigan. The Heywood-Wakefield Company Complex in Gardner, Massachusetts was added to the National Historic Register in 1983.

The South Beach Furniture Company acquired the rights to the Heywood-Wakefield name in 1992. Upon discovering the demand for vintage pieces, the company began manufacturing new pieces in the style of vintage Heywood-Wakefield furniture. In 2022, the company changed its name and officially became Heywood-Wakefield Co. The company is now run by third-generation furniture maker Tom Belletete and all furniture is made in Winchendon, Massachusetts.

== Products ==
Both founding companies produced wicker and rattan furniture in the late 19th century. Wakefield initiated its mechanized production. The wicker styles drew on the Aesthetic Movement and Japanese influences; simpler designs arose in the wake of the Arts and Crafts Movement. The merged entity stayed abreast of wicker furniture trends by hiring designers such as Paul Frankl and Donald Deskey during the 1920s. The 1920s saw the company move into installing seating in movie palaces. Its furniture was exhibited at the 1933 Century of Progress exhibition and at the 1964 New York World's Fair.

During the 1930s and 1940s, Heywood-Wakefield began producing furniture using sleek designs based on French Art Deco. In fact, many well-known and influential designers contributed to Heywood-Wakefield during this time period; these included Gilbert Rohde, Russel Wright, Alexis de Sakhnoffsky, and W. Joseph Carr.

Long-haul bus companies began focusing on passenger comfort in the 1920s. Heywood-Wakefield's bucket seats proved successful and rail companies began to follow suit. Together with the Association of American Railroads' Mechanical Division, Heywood-Wakefield became involved in the quest for more luxurious seat design. Through a grant from Heywood-Wakefield, the Association employed a Harvard professor of anthropology, E. A. Hooton, to research rail passenger seat preferences in 1945. Heywood-Wakefield's resulting Sleepy Hollow seat came into wide use.
