= Ella Castelhun =

American architect

- Born: October 31, 1868; St. Louis, Missouri
- Died: December 30, 1961 (aged 93); San Francisco, California
- Occupation(s): Architect, educator
- Relatives: Paulus Roetter (grandfather)

Ella Castelhun (October 31, 1868 – December 30, 1961) was an American architect who operated primarily in San Francisco in the early 20th century.

== Early life and education ==
Castelhun was born in St. Louis, Missouri, one of the ten children of Friedrich Carl (known as Fred, or Charley) Castelhun and Lydia Paulina Roetter Castelhun. Her father was a physician and poet, born in Germany, and her maternal grandfather Paulus Roetter was a noted scientific illustrator, also born in Germany.

Castelhun became certified to teach second grade in 1888. She studied at the Mark Hopkins Institute of Art in San Francisco in the 1890s. In 1893, at the age of 25, Castelhun enrolled for the fall semester at the University of California, Berkeley. She graduated with a bachelor's degree in 1898, and in 1903 became certified to teach high school. However, she continued her graduate studies in architecture and was licensed in 1905. In 1907 she went to Paris for further education.

== Career ==
In 1905, one year after Julia Morgan was licensed, Castelhun became the second woman to be registered as an architect in the state of California. Only three buildings are specifically known to have been designed by Castelhun, three houses built for different women who were likely known to Castelhun. These include:

- Olander House at 265-67 Lexington Street, San Francisco, built for Mathilda Olander;
- 48-50 Merritt Street (now 3054-56 Market Street), built for Winifred McKeown;
- Another house, built at 68 Palm Street, San Francisco, for Margaret Doyle.

She sold a ranch in Petaluma and bought a block of apartments in San Francisco in 1917. Likely due to difficulties in finding clients in the aftermath of World War I, Castelhun gave up her architecture license in 1921. In addition to her career as an architect, Castelhun was also an artist,

Castelhun taught German and Latin in San Francisco-area schools from about 1890 to 1939. She directed a production of As You Like It in 1898, at Patterson Ranch. In 1915 she co-directed a student production of Schiller's Der Neffe als Onkel at Girls' High School.

== Personal life ==
Castelhun died in 1961, in San Francisco, at the age of 93. Her grave is in Mountain View Cemetery in Oakland.

== See also ==
- List of California women architects
