= Henrietta May Steinmesch =

American architect

- Born: May 9, 1893; Philadelphia
- Died: May 21, 1979 (aged 86); Pasadena
- Occupation: Architect
- Known for: Association of Women in Architecture (AWA)

Henrietta May Steinmesch (1893 – 1979) (Note: Allaback provides her name as Mae, while the archive spells it May. Many sources use May Steinmesch) was an American architect most notable as a founding member and later the first national president of the Association of Women Architects.

== Early life and education ==
Henrietta May Steinmesch was born in University City, Philadelphia, Pennsylvania to a poultry and feed merchant. At least one source says she was born May 9, 1893, in St. Louis.

Steinmesch obtained a bachelor of architecture from Washington University in St. Louis in 1915. She was known as May, and used H. May Steinmesch as her professional name.

== Association of Women in Architecture ==
In her last year at university, she was one of four founding members of the Association of Women in Architecture (AWA). One of their first activities was "La Confrerie Alonginv" (vignola backwards), in 1921, they sent letters to other schools and chapters were started in the University of Minnesota, University of Texas, and University of California Berkeley. The association aimed to encourage contact among women architects at other universities; its Greek name Alpha Alpha Gamma derives from the phrase "advancement of architecture among women".

From 1928 until 1930 she was the first president of the national organization. In 1930, she saw the need to create a public archive for the association's collection. The national organization dissolved in 1964, with local chapters such as the one in Los Angeles remaining. The AWA has been known under several names: in 1975, the Association for Women in Architecture, 1948, The Association of Women in Architecture and Allied Arts, and 2012, Association for Women in Architecture + Design (AWA+D). In 1999 the organization became nonprofit, providing scholarships for female students.

== Career ==
Initially, Steinmesch worked on government projects for the City Plan Commission, U.S. Engineers, and U.S. Airforce's Aeronautical Chart Plant in St. Louis. In San Francisco, she worked for the Western Division of USO Building Services in as Associate Building Director during World War II. Later she worked on residential projects for Arts and Crafts architect Henry Higby Gutterson (1884-1954), San Francisco's Redevelopment Agency, and established her own Pasadena office in 1953.

Steinmesch continued her studies with university extension courses and by teaching. She worked into her 60s.

Some of Steinmesch's papers are located in the "Association of Women in Architecture Papers, 1928-1992" held by the International Archive of Women in Architecture at the University libraries of Virginia Polytechnic Institute and State College in Blacksburg, Virginia. Other papers may be located at the AWA in Los Angeles. she died on May 21, 1979 of congestive heart failure at 86

== Works ==
- 1964 Junior College (proposal), California
- c1930 Facilities at Scott Air Force Base
