= West Gardner Square Historic District =

Historic district in Massachusetts, United States

- U.S. National Register of Historic Places
- U.S. Historic district
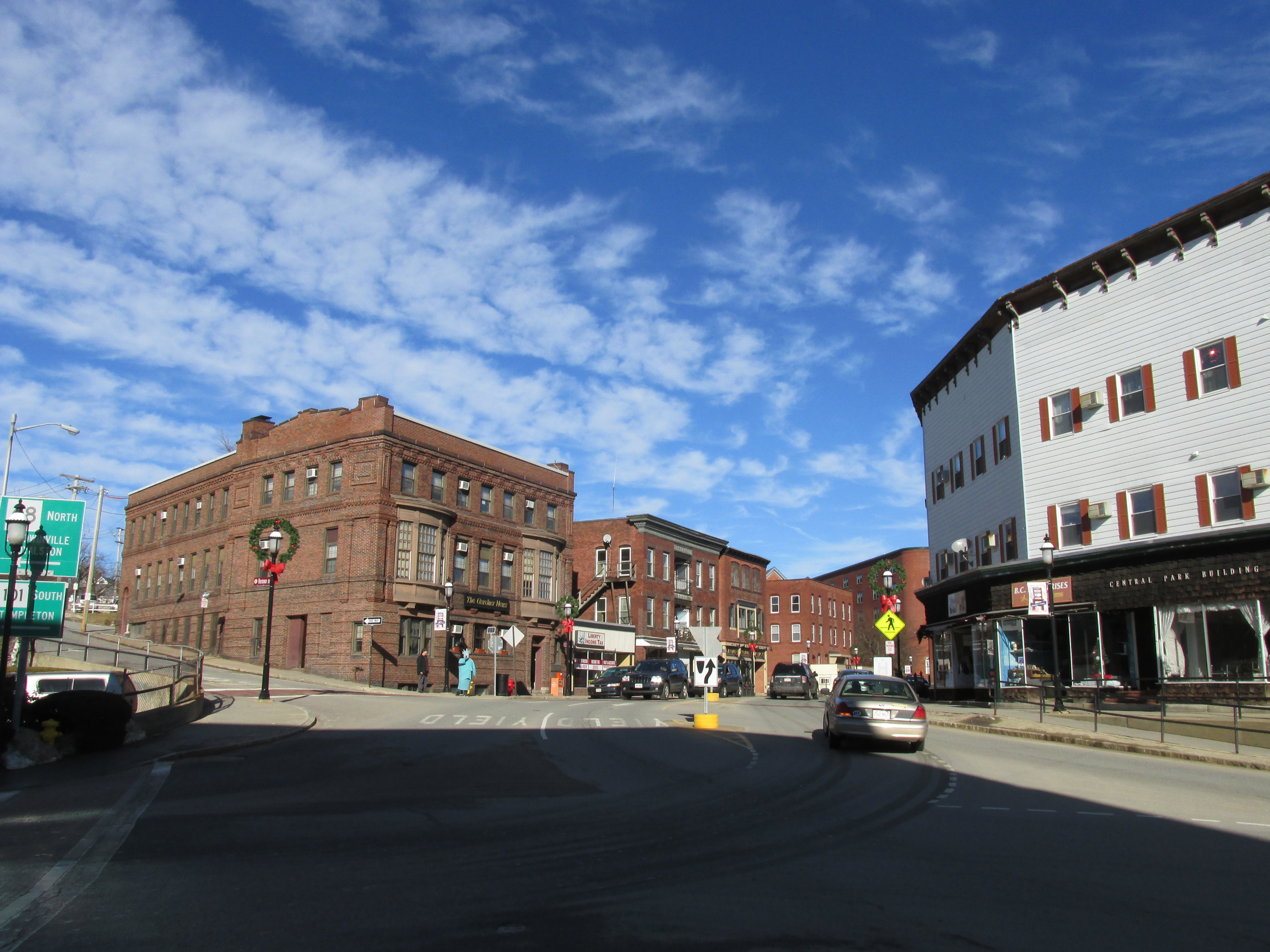
- Central Street

- Location within Massachusetts Location within the United States
- Location: Downtown Gardner, Massachusetts
- Coordinates: 42°34′29″N 71°59′43″W
- Area: 340 acres (140 ha)
- Architect: Multiple
- Architectural style: Late 19th and 20th Century Revivals, Greek Revival, Late Victorian
- NRHP reference No.: 85003185
- Added to NRHP: December 30, 1985

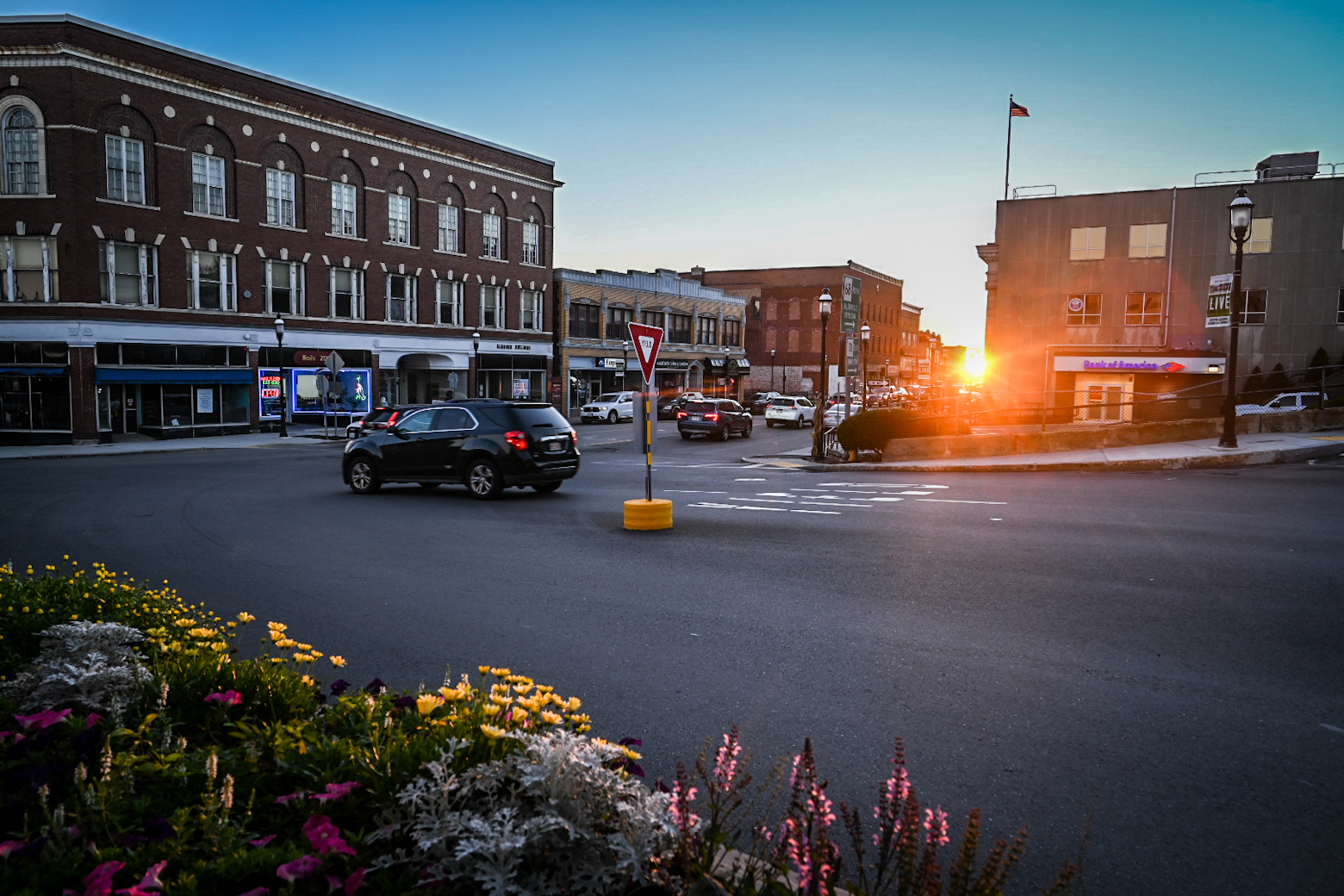
West Gardner Square Historic District now known as the Center of Gardner MA at sunset

The West Gardner Square Historic District encompasses the historic commercial, civic and industrial downtown area of Gardner, Massachusetts. Developed industrially beginning in the early 19th century, the area now boasts a concentration of late 19th and early 20th century commercial, civic, and industrial architecture. It was listed on the National Register of Historic Places in 1985.

== Description and history ==
The town of Gardner was incorporated in 1785 out of parts of surrounding towns, with its original town center located northeast of the present commercial downtown. It developed beginning in the early 19th century as a center for the manufacture of furniture, in particular chairs, powered by waters of local streams. By the 1840s the town was an acknowledged leader in chair making, employing some 350 people in that trade. The town's civic focus shifted from the original center to be nearer the industrial area. The arrival of railroads in 1847 and 1871 spurred increased growth.

The historic district encompasses most of downtown Gardner's historic civic, commercial, and industrial buildings. It is centered around the five-way intersection of Vernon, Parker, Central, Main, and West Lynde Streets. Commercial and civic resources radiate mainly west and south from there, with three large surviving mill complexes to the east. Most of the commercial buildings range in height from one to four stories, while buildings in the industrial mill complexes range up to six stories in height. There are only a few wood-frame residential structures in the area, which typically predate the late 19th-century development period. The district includes the town's major civic buildings, including its town hall, public library, and post office. Buildings individually listed on the National Register include the Garbose Building, the Gardner News Building, the Lake Street Fire Station, and the Heywood-Wakefield Company Complex.

== See also ==
- National Register of Historic Places listings in northern Worcester County, Massachusetts
