= Barbara Bestor =

American architect

- Born: 1966
- Education: Harvard University; Southern California Institute of Architecture
- Occupation: Architect
- Known for: Beats Electronics, Intelligentsia Coffee & Tea
- Spouse(s): Tom Stern (divorced); Adam Silverman (divorced)
- Children: 2

Barbara Bestor (born 1966) is an American architect based in Los Angeles, California. She is the principal of Bestor Architecture, founded in 1992. Examples of her work include the Beats Electronics Headquarters in Culver City, Blackbirds, small lot housing in Los Angeles, Intelligentsia Coffee & Tea in Los Angeles, the revitalization of Silvertop, originally designed by John Lautner and the Toro Canyon House in Santa Barbara. In 2017 she was elected to the AIA's College of Fellows.

== Early life ==
Barbara Bestor grew up in Cambridge, Massachusetts, where her father was an anthropologist and her mother was a college administrator. She interned for Cambridge Seven Associates through college, with a study-abroad year at the Architectural Association School of Architecture in London, eventually graduating from Harvard University in 1987. She then received a master's degree in architecture from the Southern California Institute of Architecture in Los Angeles in 1992.

== Career ==
Bestor began her architectural practice in Los Angeles in 1992. In her early career, she renovated many private residences in the Los Angeles area. She also designed the Actors' Gang theater in Hollywood with fellow architect Norman Millar. In 2001, she taught architecture at the Harvard Graduate School of Design. She returned to Los Angeles a year later, in 2002. She has taught architecture at the University of California, Los Angeles.

Bestor has taught at the Woodbury University School of Architecture in Burbank, California, where she is also the executive director of the Julius Shulman Institute. She was the founding Chair of the Graduate program. In 2014, with Catherine Gudis, Thomas Kracauer, and Shannon Starkey, she curated an exhibition about the environmental graphic designer Deborah Sussman at Woodbury. She has been a TEDx speaker. In 2017 the exhibition Albert Frey and Lina Bo Bardi: A Search for Living Architecture, designed by Bestor Architecture, opened at the Palm Springs Art Museum.

Bestor has designed private residences in Echo Park, Pacific Palisades, Mount Washington, Silverlake, Los Feliz, Topanga Canyon, and Santa Barbara. She has also designed stores and restaurants in Los Angeles, New York City, and Tokyo. In 2011, she was the recipient of the LA Restaurant Design Award from the American Institute of Architects for her design of the Pitfire Pizza in LA. She was also nominated for the James Beard Foundation Award for the same restaurant that year. The Floating Bungalow house in Venice, CA was featured in MOCA's 2013 survey of contemporary Los Angeles architecture. In 2015, the Beats By Dre Headquarters was recognized with a National AIA Honor Award for Interior Architecture. In 2017 two new projects opened, the Ashes & Diamonds Winery and Event Center and the Silverlake Conservatory of Music. Since the opening of Blackbirds Bestor has explored a variety of housing solutions for Los Angeles, ultimately receiving second place in the city's Low Rise competition.

== Personal life ==
She has two daughters from a previous marriage.

== Bibliography ==
- Barbara Bestor. Bohemian Modern: Living in Silver Lake. New York City: HarperCollins. 2006. 272 pages.

== See also ==
- List of California women architects
