= Ernest Fleischmann =

German-born American impresario

- Blanche Gerstman (left) and Ernest Fleischmann (right) in conducting class in 1947
- Born: December 7, 1924; Frankfurt am Main, Germany
- Died: June 13, 2010 (aged 85); Los Angeles, United States
- Education: University of the Witwatersrand, University of Cape Town
- Occupation: Impresario
- Spouse: Elsa Leviseur

Ernest Martin Fleischmann (December 7, 1924 – June 13, 2010) was a German-born American impresario who served for 30 years as executive director of the Los Angeles Philharmonic, which he upgraded to become a top-ranked orchestra. A talented musician, he chose a career on the business aspect of music, rather than a life as a conductor.

== Early life and education ==
Fleischmann was born in Frankfurt am Main on December 7, 1924, to Gustav and Toni (née Koch). His Jewish family fled Nazi Germany and emigrated to South Africa. There he learned music as a teenager and made his debut as a professional conductor in 1942, when he was only 17 years old. He earned an undergraduate degree in accounting from the University of the Witwatersrand and received a degree in music from the University of Cape Town. He organized music for the Johannesburg Festival starting in 1956, for which he commissioned William Walton to create the Johannesburg Festival Overture in honor of the city's 70th anniversary. He married Elsa Leviseur in 1953, who practiced as an architect in South Africa, US and England.

== Career ==
In 1959, he took a position as general manager of the London Symphony Orchestra, spurning an offer from the Cape Town Symphony Orchestra. In London, he arranged for the orchestra to perform an annual season at Carnegie Hall in New York City and commissioned works by Richard Rodney Bennett and Sir Arthur Bliss, in addition to exchange concerts with the Israel Philharmonic Orchestra. He left the LSO in 1967 and worked for a short time as the European director of CBS Masterworks Records.

When he became executive director of the Los Angeles Philharmonic in 1969, Zubin Mehta was conductor at the distinguished Dorothy Chandler Pavilion, but the musicians in the orchestra were not paid what they were worth. During his tenure in Los Angeles, Fleischmann more than doubled the pay for musicians and added a summer season at the Hollywood Bowl.

In addition to improving the orchestra's financial condition, a $50 million donation from Lillian Disney that went towards the construction of the Frank Gehry-designed Walt Disney Concert Hall meant the philharmonic played in a hall with acoustics far superior to their former venue. He brought in Carlo Maria Giulini as conductor from 1978 to 1985, who was replaced by André Previn. Previn, who had an ongoing feud with Fleischmann, left abruptly at the end of the 1989 season and would later call Fleischmann "an untrustworthy, scheming bastard".

Fleischmann brought in Finn Esa-Pekka Salonen in 1992, who The Wall Street Journal credited with transforming the orchestra into a "lean, disciplined machine". Venezuelan Gustavo Dudamel was hired in 2009 to succeed Salonen. Fleischmann had identified Dudamel as a prodigy when he won the inaugural Gustav Mahler Conducting Competition in 2004, where Fleischmann and Salonen had been among the judges. Reviewer Mark Swed of the Los Angeles Times credited Fleischmann with having "transformed a provincial second-rank orchestra into one of the world's best".

Named as general administrator and artistic director of the Paris Opera in November 1985, Fleischmann turned down the post just days later.

== Later life and legacy ==
Described by The New York Times as "a taskmaster and an office tyrant", Fleischmann was once described by an employee as "egocentric, completely unprincipled and yet incredibly brilliant monomaniac in music". Fleischmann also had a long-standing feud with Los Angeles Times music critic Martin Bernheimer, whose backbiting criticism had a negative effect on morale in the orchestra. Bernheimer, who won a Pulitzer Prize for Criticism in 1982, called Fleischmann "ruthless, a manipulator, and very smart and very progressive".

Fleischmann died at age 85 on June 13, 2010, in Los Angeles. He was survived by two daughters and a son.
