= Garbose Building =

- U.S. National Register of Historic Places
- U.S. Historic district – Contributing property
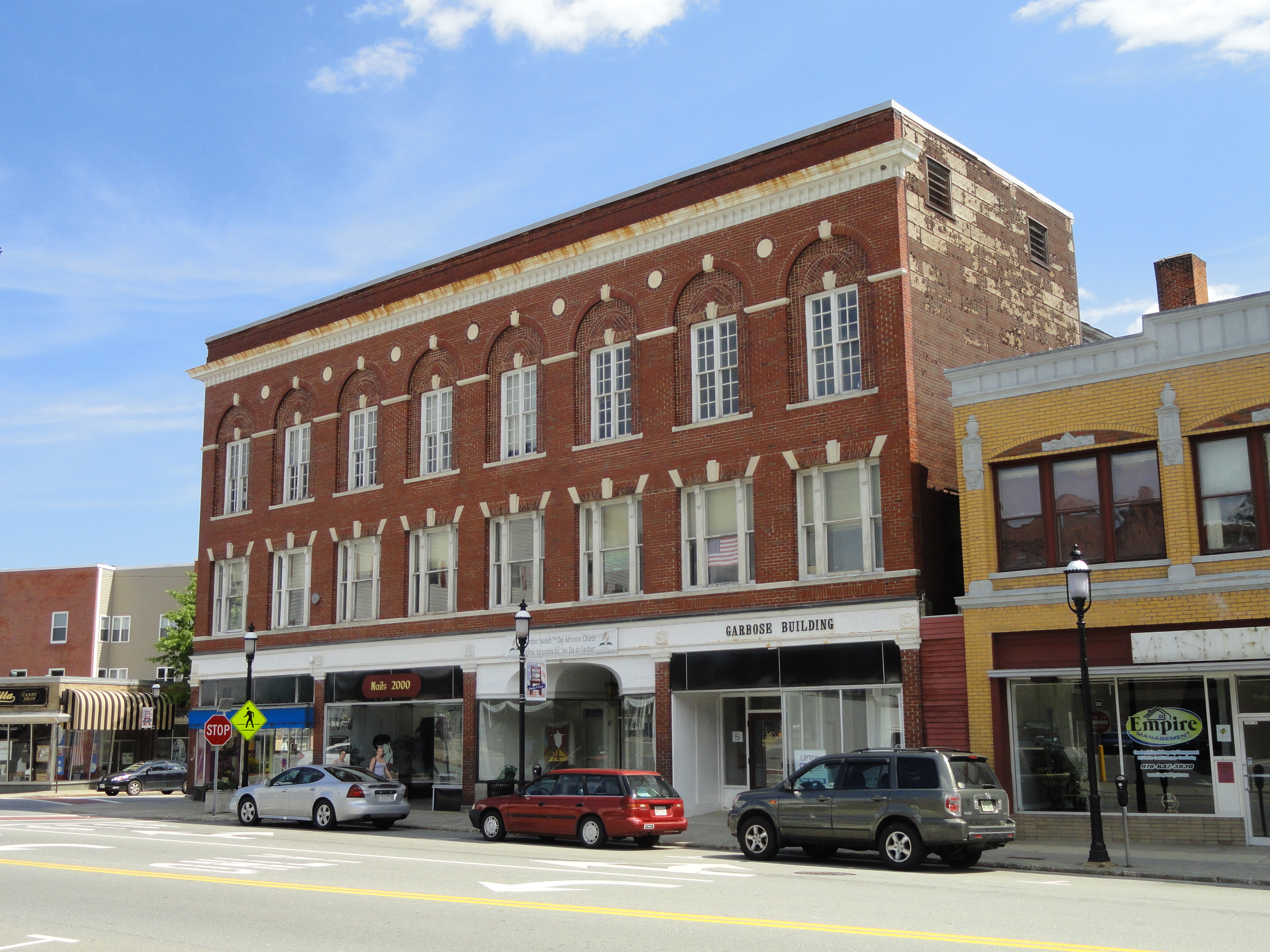

- Location within Massachusetts Location within the United States
- Location: 4-12 Pleasant Street, Gardner, Massachusetts
- Coordinates: 42°34′33″N 71°59′46″W
- Area: less than one acre
- Built: c. 1883
- Architectural style: Classical Revival
- Part of: West Gardner Square Historic District (ID85003185)
- NRHP reference No.: 83000609

Significant dates
- Added to NRHP: April 12, 1983
- Designated CP: December 30, 1985

The Garbose Building is a historic commercial building located at 4-12 Pleasant Street in Gardner, Massachusetts. Built in the mid-1880s, it was extensively restyled in the 1910s, and now stands as one of the city's finest examples of Colonial Revival architecture. The building was listed on the National Register of Historic Places on April 12, 1983, and included in the West Gardner Square Historic District on December 30, 1985.

== Description and history ==
The Garbose Building is prominently located in the commercial heart of downtown Gardner, at the southwest corner of Parker and Pleasant Streets in West Gardner Square. It is a three-story masonry structure, built with a wood frame and finished with red brick with marble trim. Its ground floor has three storefronts and the main building entrance facing Pleasant Street, each section separated from the other by a brick pilaster with marble capitals. A frieze band separates the first and second floors. Second-floor windows are three-part, with marble keystones and springers. Third-floor windows are set in recessed round-arch panels, with both the rectangular window opening and arch top having marble keystones. A decorative cornice is topped by a low parapet and flat roof.

When built in the mid-1880s, the building was in the then-popular Second Empire style, with clapboarded exterior and mansarded tower at the corner. It was built by Guy Garland, and provided stores on the ground floor, offices on the second, and an auditorium on the third. The building went through a succession of names, taken from the succession of owners between its construction and the 1920s, when it was purchased by Abe and Samuel Garbose, who ran a clothing store as tenants. Its transformation from Second Empire to Colonial Revival styling took place during the ownership of the Ryan Brothers, sometime between 1907 and 1921.

== See also ==
- National Register of Historic Places listings in Worcester County, Massachusetts
