= Olive Chadeayne =

American architect

Olive Kingsley Chadeayne
- Born: February 9, 1904; Ossining, New York, U.S.
- Died: February 23, 2001 (aged 97); Tracy, California, U.S.
- Education: University of California, Berkeley
- Occupation: Architect
- Practice: Pierpoint and Walter S. Davis; Lilian Rice; Olive Chadeayne; Daniel, Mann, Johnson, and Mendenhall; Jones and Emmons
- Projects: U.S. Consulate in Singapore; Bank of America Headquarters

Olive Kingsley Chadeayne (February 9, 1904 - February 23, 2001) was an American architect who worked primarily in California from 1927 to 1970.

== Early life and education ==
Though born in New York, at the age of eleven Chadeayne moved with her family to Van Nuys in southern California. She began studying architecture in 1922 at UCLA, but transferred to the University of California, Berkeley in 1923 after the program at UCLA was discontinued. She graduated in 1926 with her B.A., after which she continued with post-graduate studies for one year, receiving her master's in 1927.

== Career ==
Following her graduation, Chadeayne sought work at a number of Los Angeles-based firms, but found that few would consider hiring a woman. Eventually she was able to find work as a draftsperson at the firm of Pierpoint and Walter S. Davis. After their office closed during the Depression, she was able to find work in the mid-1930s with the architect and fellow UC Berkeley alumna Lilian Jeannette Rice. Based in the Rancho Santa Fe area, she specialized in residences and civic buildings in the Spanish Colonial Revival style. Following Rice's death from ovarian cancer in late 1938, Chadeayne completed several of her unfinished projects and closed the firm's office soon thereafter. She began to teach a House Planning course at Cornell University as part of the Home Economics curriculum, but returned to Burbank, California in 1942, where she worked as a production illustrator for the Lockheed Corporation for the rest of World War II.

Chadeayne resumed her own practice following the war, while contracting with other firms. In 1951, she took a job with the large firm David, Mann, Johnson, and Mendenhall where she became experienced in writing specifications, which developed into her specialty for the remainder of her career. She retired in 1970, but continued to work on a part-time basis and shared her expertise through organizations like the Association for Women Architects and the American Institute of Architects.

== Notable projects ==
=== Building designs ===
All in California, in Los Angeles unless otherwise noted:

- Pasadena Civic Auditorium entrance lobby, Pasadena (1932)
- Burroughs Residence, La Jolla (1938)
- Cramer Residence (1945)
- Stratton Store (1946)
- Bevis Residence, Patterson (1949 - 1953)
- Theis Residence (1950 - 1951)
- Schiebel Residence (1956)

=== Buildings specifications ===
- U.S. Consulate in Singapore
- Bank of America Headquarters, San Francisco, California (1966 - 1970)

== See also ==
- Lilian Jeannette Rice
- List of women architects
- The International Archive of Women in Architecture
- List of California women architects
