= Elizabeth Boyter =

American architect (1896-1958)

- Born: October 21, 1896; Alameda, California, U.S.
- Died: June 24, 1958 (aged 61); San Francisco, California, U.S.
- Education: University of California, Berkeley
- Occupations: Architect, draftswoman
- Years active: 1917-1958
- Employer(s): Julia Morgan, Ernest Born, Architectural Forum

Elizabeth "Bess" Boyter was an American architect and draftswoman.

== Early life and education ==
Boyter was born to John and Catherine Boyter (nee Connell); her father John was a bank clerk and rancher. Before matriculating at Berkeley, she worked as a junior draftsman for Smith O'Brien, Architect, and the U.S. Bureau of Public Roads as a highway draftsman. She attended the University of California, Berkeley, from 1921 to 1925, earning a B.A. in Architecture. While a student she became a member of the California chapter of Alpha Alpha Gamma, a national sorority for women architectural students that eventually became the Association for Women in Architecture + Design (AWA+D). After taking her degree she worked in the office of Julia Morgan, until she left in 1929 to find work in New York.

== Mid-to-late career and death ==
In New York Boyter worked at an architectural office for eight months and at the Otis Elevator Company, designing layouts for escalators, for two years. During the height of the Depression she attempted to find work teaching architectural design and drafting. One of her typewritten manuals on drafting, most likely written in the early 1930s, still exists as part of the AWA+D Records at the International Archive of Women in Architecture at Virginia Tech.

Although she earned her license to practice architecture in New York in 1935, she returned to California shortly thereafter, where she found work at Ernest Born's office in San Francisco. She applied for and received her license to practice in California in 1937, and was noted at the time for being only the 11th woman to be licensed in Northern California.

During the Second World War she took courses on structural engineering aspects of civilian air raid protection, advanced personnel management, and industrial psychology at the Stanford University Engineering Science and Management War Training program. She became the 10th California woman admitted to the ranks of the American Institute of Architects in 1945.

Diagnosed with acute monoblastic leukemia in September 1957, Boyter was admitted to the University of California Hospital in San Francisco in June 1958, where she died of a brain hemorrhage (a complication from her leukemia). Ample evidence of her lifelong ailments and injuries can be found among her papers and diaries at the Bancroft Library.

== Built projects ==
- Van Meter Residence, Edwards Ave., Sausalito, CA, 1927
- Eakin Residence, Cragmont Ave., Berkeley, CA, 1950
