= Ashes & Diamonds Winery =

Winery in Napa Valley, CA, US

Coordinates: 38.344309°N 122.326294°W

Ashes & Diamonds Winery is a winery located in the Oak Knoll district of Napa Valley. Wine production began in 2014, and a tasting room was opened in October 2017. Ashes & Diamonds is known for producing wines which are influenced by ‘60s and ‘70s Napa wine-making techniques, and are lower-than-average in alcohol content, as well as for its mid-century modern architecture by Barbara Bestor.

The property includes a 5,500-square-foot hospitality space and a 17,250-square-foot vineyard which is planted to 38 acres of primarily Merlot and Cabernet Franc. Some Syrah and Chardonnay are also grown and sold to other producers.

== History ==
Ashes & Diamonds was founded and is owned by former multimedia and advertising executive Kashy Khaledi. Dan Petroski and Steve Matthiasson were the winemakers for the initial vintages; from 2015 on, Diana Snowden Seysses replaced Petroski. The executive chef is Ethan Speizer.

== Production ==
Ashes & Diamonds produces 6,000 cases of wine annually. In addition to those grown on the estate, grapes are also sourced from winegrowers Bart and Daphne Araujo (Red Hen Vineyard, Rancho Pequeño Vineyard) and Lisa Chu (Saffron Vineyard). Labels for the bottles were created by graphic designer Brian Roettinger, known for designing Jay-Z’s Magna Carta Holy Grail album cover.
