= Grace Jewett =

American architect

Grace Jewett (1876–1946) was an American architect in the early 20th century. She was one of the pioneer women in architecture, and successfully developed her career in San Francisco after the devastation caused by the earthquake and fire in 1906. Jewett studied at the Pratt Institute in New York from 1900 to 1902, and her career spanned from 1902 to 1943.She is most well known for her success in designing apartment buildings, but she also worked on various industrial facilities. In 1913, Jewett opened her own practice in downtown San Francisco. She also often collaborated with Italian architect Italo Zanolini.

Some of Jewett's most significant industrial designs include a factory for American Machine Works, a warehouse on 8th street, and a garage on Bush street. She is also known for her design of the Women's Club of San Mateo in the early 1920s.

After moving to Los Angeles in 1923, it is unknown if Jewett continued her career in architecture because of a lack of records. In 1945, she officially retired as an architect. Ms. Jewett was partially crippled, and in her later life relied on the help of her longtime friend and partner, Erskine Hathaway. On April 12, 1946, Grace Jewett committed suicide, and the news reached the Oakland Tribune, but there was no mention of her achievements in architecture.

== See also ==
- List of California women architects
