= Johannesburg Festival Overture =

1956 orchestral composition by William Walton

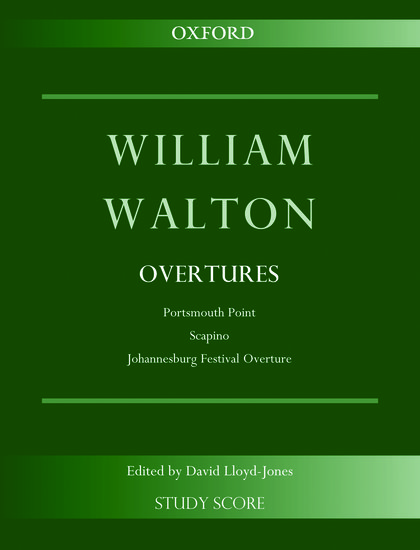
Cover of published score

Johannesburg Festival Overture is a composition for orchestra by the English composer William Walton, commissioned to mark the seventieth anniversary of Johannesburg in 1956. It is a short, lively piece, fast-moving throughout.

== Background ==
In 1956, to celebrate the seventieth anniversary of the founding of Johannesburg, the city organised a festival. Leading performers were engaged including Margot Fonteyn, the La Scala company, the London Symphony Orchestra (LSO), and as soloists Yehudi Menuhin, Andrés Segovia and Pierre Fournier and as conductors Sir Malcolm Sargent and Guido Cantelli. Among the works the LSO scheduled for its five concerts was Walton's First Symphony, but Ernest Fleischmann, the musical director of the festival, also wanted a new Walton piece for the opening concert. He approached the composer in January 1956 with a commission for an orchestral work. He suggested that the piece should include some African themes, and sent Walton some Bantu melodies. Walton sent for recordings of African music from the African Music Society, and worked on the piece at his home in Ischia from February until the end of May 1956. He incorporated the main theme from Jean Bosco Mwenda's "Masanga", which had been released on record earlier in the decade. Also included was a theme from Ruanda-Urundi, "Nimuze".

Walton described the overture to his publisher as "a non-stop gallop ... slightly crazy, hilarious and vulgar". Walton's biographer Michael Kennedy calls it "a seven-minute Rossinian romp".

== First performances ==
Sargent conducted the South African Broadcasting Corporation Symphony Orchestra on 25 September 1956 at Johannesburg City Hall in the concert that opened the festival. Efrem Kurtz introduced the work to Britain in a Liverpool Philharmonic concert on 13 November 1956 at the Philharmonic Hall. Sargent conducted the first London performance, with the BBC Symphony Orchestra at the Royal Festival Hall on 23 January 1957. The American premiere was given by the Boston Symphony Orchestra conducted by Charles Munch on 15 March 1957.

== Score ==
The work is scored for three flutes (third doubling piccolo), two oboes, cor anglais, three clarinets in A, three bassoons (third doubling contrabassoon) – four horns in F, three trumpets in B-flat, three trombones, tuba – timpani, three or four percussion (side drum, cymbals, suspended cymbal, bass drum, xylophone, tambourine, triangle, tenor drum, maracas, rumba sticks, castanets, glockenspiel) – harp – strings.

The work is a rondo, fast-paced throughout. Its first tempo marking is presto capriccio; after a very small ritardando the tempo becomes vivacissimo, which accelerates into a prestissimo. The key is D.

== Publication ==
Oxford University Press published an 84 page study score in 1958. The score, edited by David Lloyd-Jones, is included in the William Walton Edition, in volume 14, "Overtures". Vilém Tauský arranged a reduced orchestra version in 1957.

== Recordings ==
The composer recorded the work with the Philharmonia Orchestra on 26 March 1957. Later recordings:

Orchestra	Conductor	Release date
New York Philharmonic	Andre Kostelanetz	1961
National Youth Orchestra of New Zealand	Ashley Heenan	1967
Royal Liverpool Philharmonic	Sir Charles Groves	1969
London Philharmonic	Bryden Thomson	1991
Radio-Sinfonieorchester Basel	Erich Schmid	1996
English Northern Philharmonia	Paul Daniel	1996

== Sources ==
- Howes, Frank (1973). The Music of William Walton (second ed.). London: Oxford University Press. ISBN 978-0-19-315431-5.
- Kennedy, Michael (1989). Portrait of Walton. Oxford: Oxford University Press. ISBN 978-0-19-816705-1.
- Lloyd, Stephen (2001). William Walton: Muse of Fire. Boydell Press. ISBN 978-0851158037.
- Morrison, Richard (2004). Orchestra: The LSO: A Century of Triumph and Turbulence. London: Faber and Faber. ISBN 978-0-57-121584-3.

== External links: music videos ==
- Johannesburg Festival Overture - Walton (Full Orchestral Score Video) on YouTube. Video duration 7m 49s. Uploader Adam Schreiber Music, 2021.
- William Walton - Johannesburg Festival Overture (Bundesjugendorchester, Alexander Shelley) on YouTube. Video duration 8m 25s. Uploader EuroArtsChannel, 2021.
