= Gardner News Building =

- U.S. National Register of Historic Places
- U.S. Historic district – Contributing property
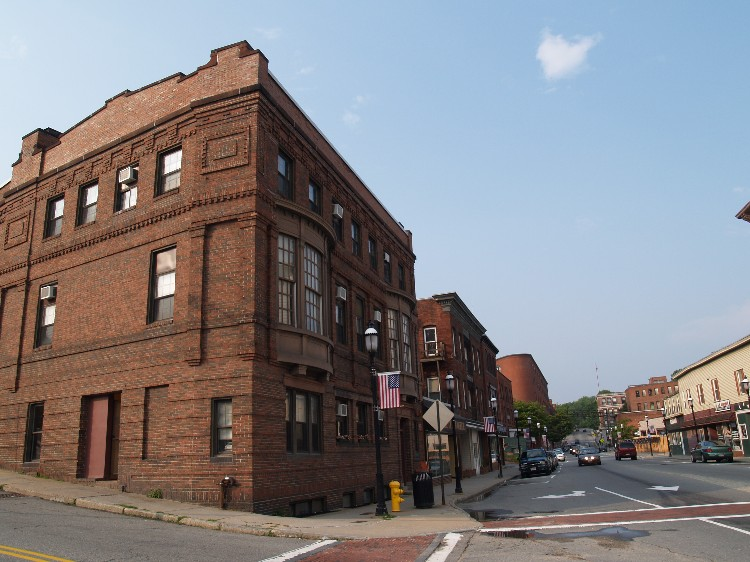

- Location within Massachusetts Location within the United States
- Location: 309 Central St., Gardner, Massachusetts
- Coordinates: 42°34′35″N 71°59′44″W
- Area: less than one acre
- Built: 1906
- Architect: Fox & Gale
- Part of: West Gardner Square Historic District (ID85003185)
- NRHP reference No.: 79000373

Significant dates
- Added to NRHP: November 14, 1979
- Designated CP: December 30, 1985

The Gardner News Building is a historic commercial building located at 309 Central Street in Gardner, Massachusetts. Built in 1906, it has served since its construction as the home of the Gardner News, a mainstay of the local news industry. The building was listed on the National Register of Historic Places on November 14, 1979, and included in the West Gardner Square Historic District on December 30, 1985.

== Description and history ==
The Gardner News Building anchors the northern end of Gardner's downtown commercial district, occupying a corner lot facing south at Vernon and Central Streets. It is a three-story brick structure, roughly trapezoidal in shape due to its lot configuration, and is adorned with sandstone and brick trim. Its main facade faces roughly south toward Central Street, and is roughly divided into three sections. The outer sections have two bays of windows on the third floor, and projecting bay windows on the second floor. The right section has the main building entrance, while that on the left has a three-part window with stone lintel. The center section of the building has three window bays on each level. There are courses of corbelled brickwork above and below the third floor, and the building is crowned by a brick parapet.

The Gardner News was founded in 1869 by A.G. Bushnell, a native of nearby Templeton. It was published weekly until 1897, when it merged with the Gardner Daily. This building was constructed for the newspaper in 1906. It was designed by the Boston firm of Fox and Gale to resemble and old English printing shop.

== See also ==
- National Register of Historic Places listings in northern Worcester County, Massachusetts
