= Lilian Jeannette Rice =

American architect

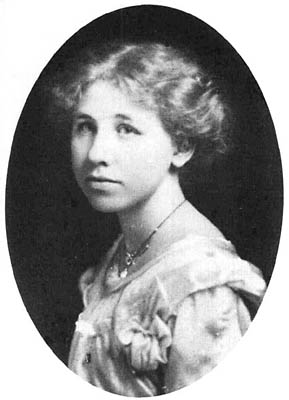
- Rice c. 1910
- Born: June 12, 1889; National City, California, United States
- Died: December 22, 1938 (aged 49); Rancho Santa Fe, California, United States
- Occupation: architect
- Design: Rancho Santa Fe, California
- Website: lilianjrice.com

Lilian Jeannette Rice (June 12, 1889 – December 22, 1938) was an eco-conscious, early 20th-century American architect working primarily in the California Spanish Colonial Revival style. Several of her works are listed on the U.S. National Register of Historic Places under spelling variation Lilian Jenette Rice.

== Biography ==
Rice was the daughter of Julius Augustus Rice (1854–1933) and Laura (Steele) Rice (1854–1939) and was born in National City, California, ten miles north of the Mexican border in South Bay, San Diego County. She was a direct patrilineal descendant of Edmund Rice, an early immigrant to the Massachusetts Bay Colony. (Note: The descendancy of Lilian Jeannette Rice from Edmund Rice is as follows: Edmund Rice (1594–1663); Thomas Rice (1626–1681); Elisha Rice (1679–1761); Zebulon Rice (1725–1799); Eliakim Rice (1785–1834); Luther Rice (1799–1876); Azro Aritis Allen Rice (1828–1916); Julius Augustus Rice (1854–1933); Lilian Jeannette Rice (1896–1938).) In 1906, she entered the University of California and successfully completed her Bachelor of Letters Degree in Social Science with a major in architecture in 1910. In 1911 she completed a course in teaching there. She returned to National City, where she worked for several years in the office of San Diego architect Hazel Wood Waterman. She later taught geometric drawing at Russ High School (now San Diego High School) and then at San Diego State Teacher's College (now San Diego State University).

In 1921, Rice was chosen by Richard Requa, of the firm of Requa and Jackson, to be the lead planner on the new development at Rancho Santa Fe in San Diego County. From 1922 until 1927 this project consumed much of her time. After her association with Requa and Jackson, Rice opened her own architectural firm in 1928, and would receive her architect's license the following year. In 1931 she became a member of the San Diego Chapter of the American Institute of Architecture, one of only a few women admitted up to that time. She hired other women to work with her, including fellow Berkeley alumna Olive Chadeayne, who worked with Rice until her death.

In July 1938 Rice was diagnosed with ovarian cancer by La Jolla physician Ross Paull, and on December 22 of the same year she died of the disease. At the time she was a permanent resident of Rancho Santa Fe. She was cremated and her remains were interred at La Vista Memorial Park Cemetery in National City. In later years the Rice family headstones were vandalized, but well-meaning volunteers replaced the violated headstones. It was at this time that Lilian J. Rice's birth date was incorrectly assigned. However, sponsored by Miriam W. Sellgren, a then living relative by marriage, of Rice's, the headstone was replaced, etched with her correct birth year. Contemporaneous birth announcements in the National City Record and the San Diego Union, plus Lilian Rice's birth certificate, prove unequivocally that she was born on June 12, 1889.

The Lilian J. Rice Elementary School in Chula Vista, California is named for her.

A number of her buildings, especially in Rancho Santa Fe, are on the National Register of Historic Places (NRHP).

"She insisted on three things in her designs: restraint in decoration, high-quality craftsmanship and harmony between a home and its site." read a New York Times obituary, written many years after her death as part of the "Overlooked" project.

In 2018, noted the Times, she was included in Pioneering Women of American Architecture, a website featuring 50 women born before 1940 who made important contributions to architecture. While Spanish Colonial Revival was not uncommon at the time, Rice was significant in making it a widespread style in California, said Mary McLeod, a professor of architecture at Columbia University Graduate School of Architecture and an editor of the website project.

“She was designing and working as an independent architect and was so productive,” McLeod said in an interview. “I have wondered if California offered women more options, if there was more freedom there.”

Rice designed at least 60 homes in Rancho Santa Fe, according to author of "Lilian J. Rice, Architect of Rancho Santa Fe, California" [Schiffer Publishing], Diane Y. Welch, Rice's official biographer. And while many have been greatly remodeled since they were built, Rice’s name still carries weight. “People cherish and value a Lilian Rice home,” she said.

== Partial list of buildings ==
=== Rancho Santa Fe, CA ===
- Charles A. Shaffer House, 5610 La Crescenta (NRHP listed)
- Claude and Florence Terwilliger House, 5880 San Elijo (NRHP listed)
- George A. C. Christiancy House, 17078 El Mirador (NRHP listed)
- Inn at Rancho Santa Fe (1922)
- Lilian Jenette Rice House, 16780 La Gracia (NRHP listed)
- Norman and Florence B. Carmichael House, 6855 La Valle Plateada (NRHP listed)
- Pearl Baker Row House (1926), 6122 Paseo Delicias (NRHP listed)
- Village Gas and Service Station (1926), Rancho Santa Fe Civic Center
- Rancho Santa Fe Garden Club (1937)
- Rancho Santa Fe Land and Improvement Company Office, 16915 Avenida de Acacias (NRHP listed)
- Reginald M. and Constance Clotfelter Row House (1926), 6112 Paseo Delicias (NRHP listed)
- Samuel Bingham House, 6427 La Plateada (NRHP listed)

=== Other sites ===
- Robinson house (1929), La Jolla, CA
- D.L. Fairchild Home, Rancho Santa Fe
- Fleet-Rice-Hoyt House (1936–1937)
- Martha Kinsey House, 1624 Ludington Ln., La Jolla, CA (1936; NRHP listed)
- ZLAC Rowing Club clubhouse, Mission Bay, CA (1932) [Rice was a member of the club and its president in 1915–1916.]

== See also ==
- List of California women architects
