= Cory Buckner =

American architect

- Education: Chouinard Art Institute (BFA); UCLA (M.Arch)
- Occupations: Architect; Author; Preservationist
- Style: Mid-century Modernism, California Modernism
- Awards: Los Angeles Conservancy Preservation Award (2002); L.A. Preservation Award (2002)
- Practice: Cory Buckner, Architect
- Buildings: Crestwood Hills Mutual Housing Association restorations
- Projects: Yerba Buena III
- Website: www.corybuckner.com

Cory Buckner is an American architect. Buckner's focus has been on restoration architecture. She received a B.F.A. from the Chouinard Art Institute and a M.Arch. from the University of California, Los Angeles.

Buckner is noted for her architectural and restoration projects in the Crestwood Hills section of Los Angeles.^{[1]}^{[2]}^{[3]}

Working with her husband, Nick Roberts, they both restored a home that was purchased in Crestwood Hills, but after restoring the house, they both led a preservation movement in the neighborhood. This was a part of a housing cooperative called Mutual Housing Association. Fifteen of the 30 remaining houses are considered Historic/Cultural Monuments in Los Angeles.

In 2002, she was awarded the L.A. Preservation Award, “For the inspiring effort to protect and restore the original Mutual Housing Association homes in Crestwood Hills, preserving important examples of Southern California Modernism, and enhancing the sense of community in a unique neighborhood.”

Los Angeles Magazine named Buckner one of "6 Women who Changed The Face of L.A. Architecture."^{[4]} She is the recipient of the 2002 Los Angeles Conservancy Award.^{[3]}

== See also ==
- List of California women architects
