= Hilde Reiss =

American architect (1909–2002)

Hilde Reiss (1909–2002) was a German-born American architect and designer. She was the first curator of design at the Walker Art Center in Minneapolis, Minnesota. She founded the Everyday Art Gallery in 1946.

== Life and work ==
Born in Berlin in 1909, Reiss, a Bauhaus-educated (1930–1932) architect and designer, emigrated to the United States in 1933 and found work with industrial designers such as Norman Bel Geddes and Gilbert Rohde. She taught design with Rohde at the WPA-sponsored Design Laboratory, a modernist art school that operated from 1935 to 1939 in New York City. She met architect William Friedman at the laboratory and relocated with him to the Walker Art Center where he assumed the role of Assistant Director of Exhibitions. In 1945, she became the first design curator at the Walker Art Center and in 1947, she became the founding curator of the Everyday Art Gallery which, as a continuation of MoMA's Good Design program, promoted mass-produced modernist designs to the public in an interactive space that doubled as an educational resource room and showroom. Reiss described the mission of the gallery as helping to "build a better daily environment for modern living." In addition to exhibitions, the gallery had retail gift shows that featured products from local shops and department stores selected by Reiss.

The Walker Art Center was the first museum in the United States to dedicate permanent exhibition space to contemporary architecture and design, and its Idea House program, begun in 1939 by Director Daniel S. Defenbacher, predated other design programs such as Arts and Architecture's Case Study House program. After Friedman and Reiss' arrival, the Walker constructed its second "Idea House". Friedman and Reiss designed Idea House II with Malcolm E. Lein, one of the architects for the original Idea House I. Intended for a family of four, House II was not meant to be a prototype, but a house of ideas meant to address the housing shortage in the post-war years. Constructed of economical materials such as steel and plywood, it had inventive common areas that still afforded privacy to each member of the family. Its flexible spaces were also designed to take advantage of solar for heat and natural light. Idea House II was furnished with progressive designs by Herman Miller and Knoll and received national exposure and publicity in major magazines and newspapers such as The New York Times Magazine and McCall's. Idea House II was often used in retailers' promotional advertisements for products featured in the house.

While at the Walker Art Center, Reiss also served as editor for Everyday Art Quarterly: A Guide to Well Designed Products which was published between 1946 and 1953 and contained photography by John Szarkowski. In the magazine, Reiss blended design updates, exhibition news, product reviews, and tracked press coverage for modern architects, artists, and industrial designers. It featured work by Charles and Ray Eames, Eero Saarinen, Harry Bertoia, Paul McCobb, Robin and Lucienne Day, and Eva Zeisel. In 1954, it was continued by Design Quarterly which ceased its affiliation with the Walker in 1993.

Reiss took a leave of absence in 1950 from the Walker Art Center and moved to California, where she worked with the Housing Authority of Vallejo and co-founded the influential store House of Today in Palo Alto in 1952.

She died in Capitola, California, in 2002.
