= Virginia Tanzmann =

American architect

- Born: New York City, United States
- Education: Syracuse University
- Occupation: Architect

Virginia Tanzmann is an American architect. She was inducted into the American Institute of Architects College of Fellows in 1992.

== Education ==
She received her Bachelor of Architecture from Syracuse University in 1969.

== Career ==
In 1978, Tanzmann founded Tanzmann Associates. She is currently the vice president of WSP | Parsons Brinckerhoff.

== Positions ==
From 1987 to 1988, Tanzmann served as president of the Association of Women in Architecture (AWA).

== Significant buildings ==
- North Hollywood station, 2000.
- Los Angeles Mission, 303 East 5th Street, Los Angeles, CA 90013
- Anaheim Regional Transportation Intermodal Center (ARTIC), 2014
- Kaleidoscope Dreams (part of North Hollywood station), 2000

== See also ==
- Elsa Leviseur

== Additional References ==
1. Virginia Tanzmann ’68, G’69 | Los Angeles (syr.edu)
2. Virginia Tanzmann | 211LA
3. Kaleidoscope Dreams – Art (metro.net)
