= Roslyn Lindheim =

American architect

Roslyn Lindheim (1921 – May 5, 1987) was an American architect and a professor at the University of California, Berkeley, who was best known for designing hospitals.

== Life and career ==
Lindheim was born in New York City and attended Radcliffe College followed by Columbia University School of Architecture. She moved to California in the 1950s, splitting her work between California and New York. She joined the faculty of the University of California, Berkeley, in 1963, where she advocated for the admission of black and Hispanic students to the Department of Architecture.

Lindheim specialized in healthcare architecture, and aimed to create "healthy and humane" environments when designing healthcare facilities. She was heavily involved with the non-profit organization Planetree, which promotes patient-centered care, and developed a set of design principles that were used at all Planetree facilities. She designed Montefiore Medical Center in the Bronx, Lucile Packard Children's Hospital at Stanford University, and the Planetree ward of California Pacific Medical Center in San Francisco.

In the 1970s, Lindheim was the principal investigator for a National Institute of Mental Health program examining the relationship between the physical environment and individuals' cultural and behavioral factors. She also conducted research for the Gerontological Society of America into environments catering for the elderly, and co-authored a book titled Environments for Sick Children. She was elected to the National Academy of Medicine in 1972, and was the first architect to receive this honor.

Her husband was Richard Lindheim, with whom she had two children. She died from cancer on May 5, 1987, at her Berkeley home.
