= Greta Magnusson-Grossman =

Swedish architect and designer (1906–1999)

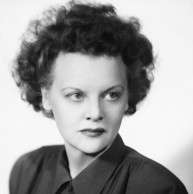
Magnusson-Grossman in the 1950s

Greta Magnusson-Grossman (July 21, 1906 – August 1999) was a Swedish furniture designer, interior designer, and architect. She was one of the few female designers to gain prominence during the mid-20th century architectural scene in Los Angeles. Her early exposure to European Modernism deeply influenced her later architectural work, seen as a synthesis of European ideals and the culture and lifestyle of Southern California.

== Early life and education ==
Magnusson-Grossman was born Greta Magnusson on July 21, 1906 in Helsingborg, Sweden.

Magnusson descended from a family of Swedish cabinetmakers, and was a woodworking apprentice at furniture manufacturer, Kärnans in Helsingborg after she graduated from Ebba Lundbergs Högre. During her apprenticeship in Helsingborg, she was the only female in the workshop. Grossman recognized the drawbacks of being a female artist and stated that she felt she had, "to be a step ahead or else". In 1928, Magnusson went on to study Furniture Design at Konstfack in Stockholm. She later studied architecture at the Royal Academy of Technology in Stockholm.

In 1933, she won the Furniture Design award from the Swedish Society of Industrial Design, becoming the first woman to win the award. That same year, she married the British jazz musician and band leader Billy Grossman in 1933. They had no children.

== Career ==
She was briefly employed by Westerberg's on Kungsgatan in Stockholm.

In 1933, Grossman was awarded second prize in the "Combination Furniture" category of a furniture competition sponsored by the Stockholm Craft Association and become the first woman ever to win in the competition.

Greta Magnusson Grossman established in the early 1930s her own firm "Studio" at Stureplan in Stockholm. There, she designed and produced furniture and accessories.

She can be heard as a contestant on the 12th November 1952 edition of You Bet Your Life.

== Los Angeles Modernism ==
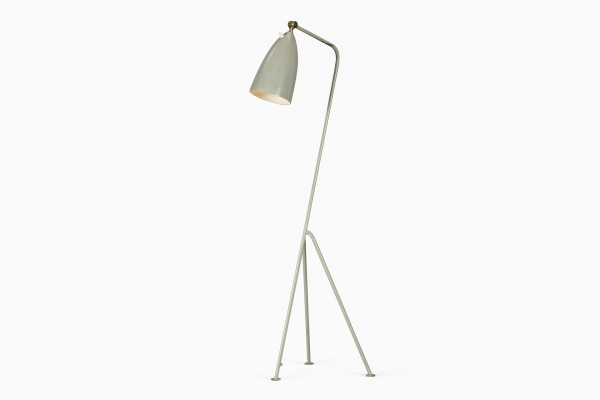
Grasshopper floorlamp 1947.

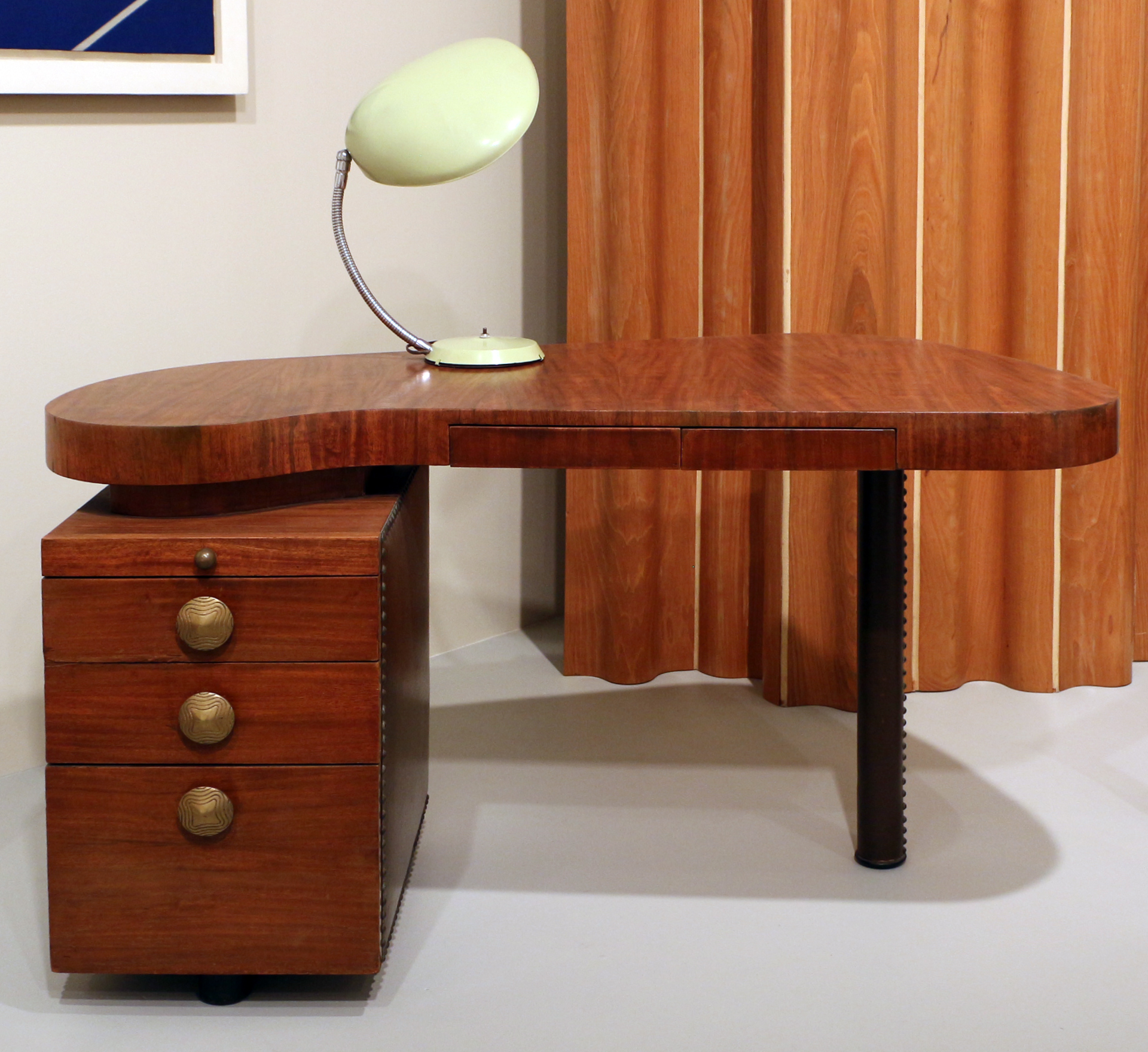
Cobra desk lamp, designed 1948–49, was awarded the Good Design Award 1950 (pictured desk by Gilbert Rohde)

In 1940, in the midst of World War II, she left Sweden and moved with her husband to Los Angeles where they opened the Magnussen-Grossman Studio on Rodeo Drive. The studio focused on furniture and lighting design and sold to several well-known furniture companies such as Sherman Bertram, Martin Brattrud, Cal-Mode and Barker Brothers' Modern Shop. Her furniture is characterized by its unique mixture of materials and slender proportions. Her work attracted Hollywood clientele, and she designed interiors for stars such as Greta Garbo and Ingrid Bergman.

Through the 1960s, she was a prominent figure in the experimental architecture world, and was influenced by European Modernists and the Bauhaus, including Walter Gropius and Ludwig Mies van der Rohe. In 1943, her split-level house in Beverly Hills was the first project that allowed Grossman to act as both interior designer and architect. The house was a major breakthrough for her as an architect and was featured in John Entenza's influential magazine Arts & Architecture. Her houses were on the smaller side, around 1,500 square feet, and were carefully crafted using materials like wood and glass. Her work reflected both the International Style of fellow European emigres such as Rudolph Schindler and Richard Neutra, with the airy, open-plan housing of the Case Study program architects, such as Craig Ellwood, the Eameses, and Pierre Koenig. Between 1949 and 1959 she designed fourteen houses in Los Angeles. Grossman became known for building homes on "difficult plots", lots under 1,500 square feet with difficult landscapes on hillsides. She later worked with influential Southern California designers such as Garrett Eckbo.

Of her sixteen built projects, fourteen of the houses were located in Los Angeles, one was in San Francisco and one was in her native Sweden.

In 1950, MoMa awarded Grossman with the Good Design award for her Cobra lamp.

Grossman was a professor and lecturer at UCLA in Furniture Design between 1957 and 1963.

== Final years ==
In 1966, Grossman retired from the architectural scene in Los Angeles and moved with her husband to a house she designed in Encinitas, just north of San Diego. She spent the last 30 years of her life living in relative obscurity and painting landscapes.

She died in August 1999.

== Legacy ==
Many of the homes she designed have been demolished, although approximately ten still remain, including the Hurley House, the Frances Nelson houses and the Jim Backus House.

In 1999, the R 20th Century design gallery in New York (now R & Company) was working on a catalogue of Grossman's work. The Los Angeles architect Pierre Koenig learned of the company's interest and sent the number of the famed architectural photographer Julius Shulman, who had taken photographs of Grossman's work during the height of her fame in the 1940s and 1950s. The company tracked and recorded much of Grossman's work following the discovery of this collection.

In 2010, an exhibition of her work appeared in Stockholm and a 2012 exhibition in Pasadena was the first career retrospective of her work.

In 2012, one of Grossman's aluminum and brass lamps sold for $37,500 at an auction, a record for her furniture pieces.

== Works cited ==
- Greta Magnusson Grossman: A Car and Some Shorts. Stockholm, Sweden: Arktekturmuseet. 2010. ISBN 978-91-85460-80-9.
- Greta Magnusson Grossman. New York, New York: R20th Century Design. September 26, 2000. ISBN 0-9704608-0-5.
