= Elsa Leviseur =

South African landscape architect

- Born: 1931; South Africa
- Died: 23 March 2023 (aged 91–92); Los Angeles, USA
- Education: University of Cape Town School of Architecture, University of California at Los Angeles
- Occupation: Architect
- Spouse: Ernest Fleischmann
- Practice: Architect, Landscape Architect

Elsa Leviseur (1931—March 23, 2023) was a South African architect specializing in landscape and ecology. She practiced in South Africa and later in England and the US.

== Early life and education ==
Leviseur was born in Pretoria, South Africa in 1931. Her mother was Beryl Iris Basson (1897–1970) and her father was doctor Ernest Alfred Leviseur (1890–1976). She married conductor Ernest Fleischmann in 1953 at the age of 22. Motivated by her friends and her keen interest in forestry, she joined architecture and earned a B.Arch. degree at the University of Cape Town School of Architecture in 1954.

== Career ==
Leviseur started a small office in South Africa and worked on designing hospitals, housing complexes and commercial projects. However, the political and social conditions in her home town were difficult due to apartheid. In 1959, when her husband got an opportunity to work as director at the London Symphony Orchestra, they decided to move to England. There, she gave birth to two daughters and a son (Stephanie, Martin and Jessica) to whom she devoted much of her time. She also started working on landscape projects as a freelance architect.

Soon her husband got another prestigious job offer, as the executive director of the Los Angeles Philharmonic, and the family moved to Los Angeles in 1969. The relocation was not easy for Leviseur, but she continued to work on small projects. She received her M.A. in Architecture and Urban Planning from the University of California at Los Angeles in 1980. She worked as project manager at Tanzmann Associates from 1980 to 1983. She registered as an architect in California in 1983 and founded the firm Leviseur Architects. She then continued with graphic and interior design for the Hollywood Bowl and the Los Angeles Philharmonic. She won first place in the competition for the design of the Wilshire Boulevard in Santa Monica. She was also the principal at Architerra in Los Angeles from 1986 to 1989.

Leviseur taught History of Landscape and the Environment at the University of California, Los Angeles from 1984 to 1989 and Landscape and Ecology at the Southern California Institute of Architecture between 1979 and 1987. She taught at the master's program at the Institute of Architecture at the University of Southern California: Art As Environment, which was established by her in 1995. She also taught at Manchester Polytechnic in the early 1990s.

Leviseur served as president of the Association for Women in Architecture plus Design from 1978 to 1979 and was a founding member of Architects/Designers/Planners for Social Responsibility. Some of her work can be found at the International Archive of Women of Architecture website. She was a member of the advisory committee for the Hudson River Coastal Front, which is committed to making proposals to revitalize the area and protect the area's memory.

== Career ==
- Manchester Polytechnic Department of Architecture and Landscape Architecture, Manchester, England (U.K.)
- Leviseur Architects, Santa Monica, CA. Principal, January 1, 1983
- Architerra, Principal, Los Angeles, CA. 1986–1989
- The Tanzmann Associates, Project Manager, Los Angeles, CA. 1980–1983
- Independent Architect, England (U.K.), 1960–1969.
- Independent Architect, South Africa, 1954–1959.

== Featured publications ==
- Voices of Experience, The Architectural Review, Volume: 218, Issue: 1303, Date Published: January 1, 2005.
- Landart, The Architectural Review, Date Published: January 1, 1991.
- Using Water with Sense and Sensibility, Rachel S. Cox, Landscape architecture, Volume: 81, Issue: 10, Page: 79–83, Date Published: January 1, 1991.
