= Paulus Roetter =

German-American botanical artist (1806–1894)

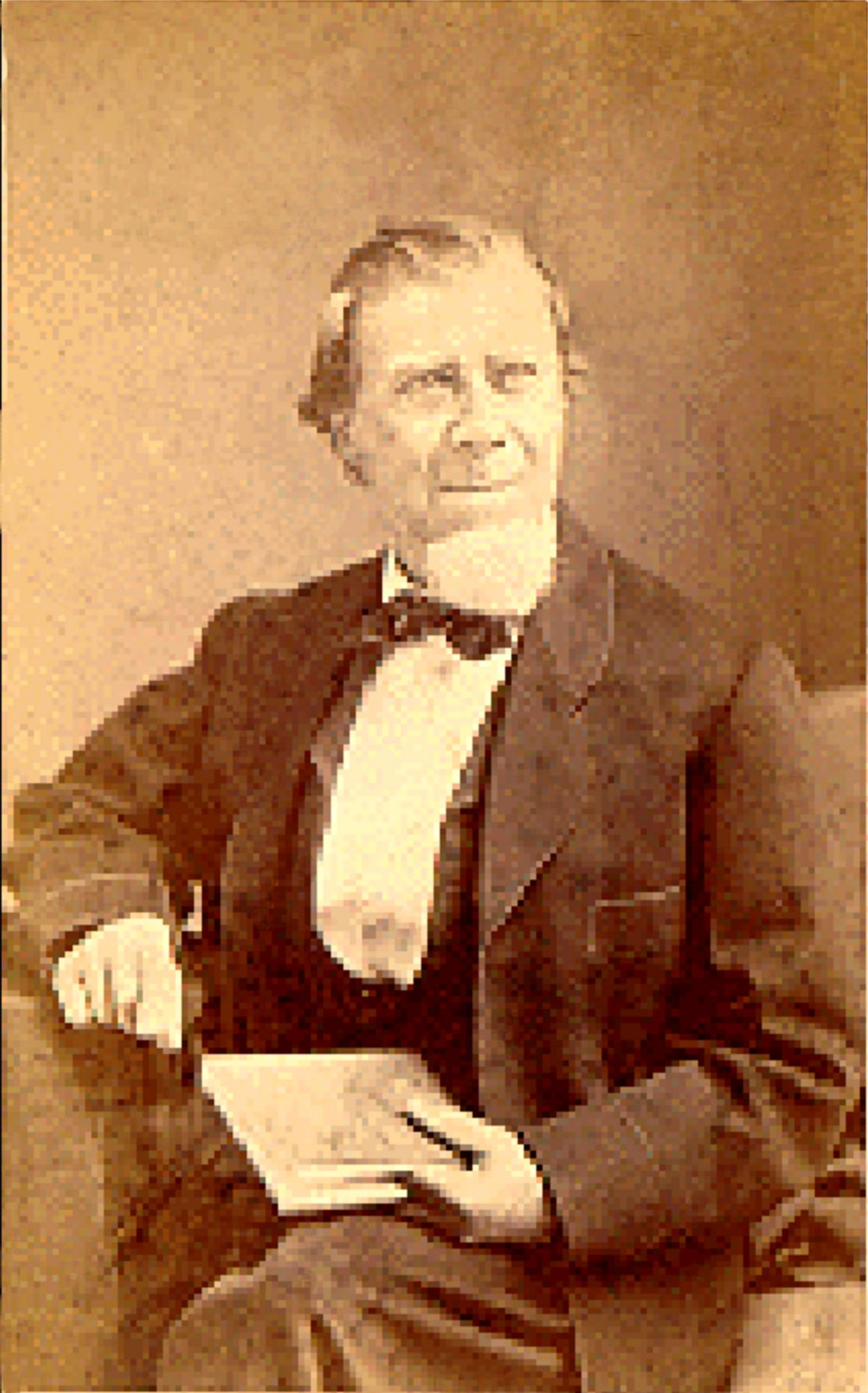

Paulus Roetter (Paulus Rötter) (4 January/July 1806 Nuremberg – 11 November 1894 St. Louis) was an American landscape painter who became a prominent botanical and ichthyological artist at Washington University and Harvard University.

== Early years ==
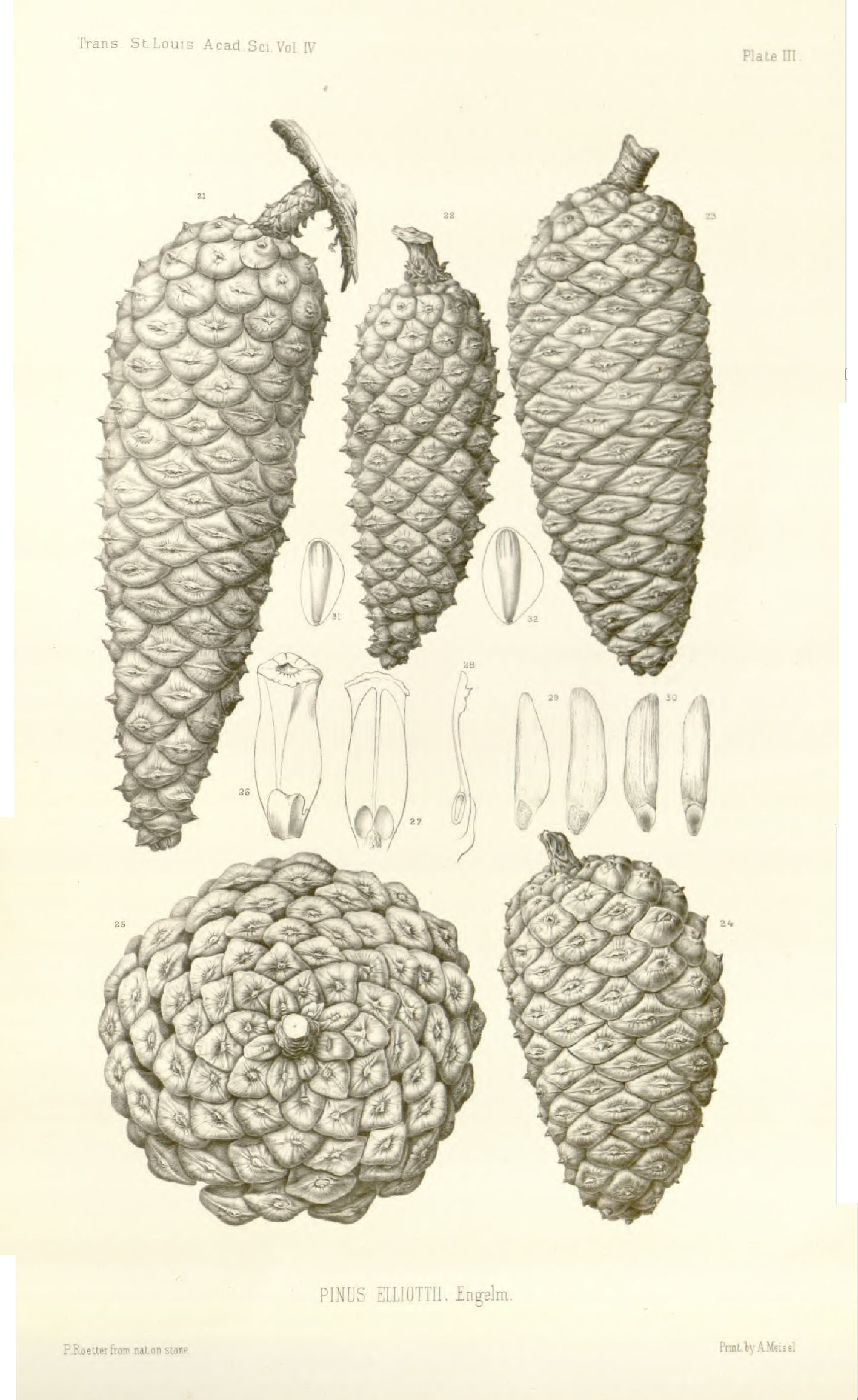
Pencil sketch of Pinus elliottii cones

Roetter was the son of a Lutheran minister and attended art classes in Düsseldorf, Munich and Nuremberg, working briefly in Paris, and in 1825 settled at Thun and Interlaken in Switzerland. Here he became a well-known landscape painter, teaching in various schools for some twenty years. He married Sophia Berner (1809–1841) and had 3 children.

== Immigration to the United States ==
Having become involved in the church, he emigrated to the United States in 1845 accompanied by family and friends, intending to found a religious settlement. For various reasons the project failed and Roetter established himself in St. Louis, becoming an art teacher at Central High School and pastor at St. Mark's Evangelical Church from 1845 to 1853.

In the US census of 1850 for St. Louis, Roetter is listed as being 44 years old, with his second wife Anna Muehleman 25 years old, and children Arnold (15), Gert (12), Anna (9), Lydia (4), Salome (2), and twins of 2 months. They were further recorded as lodging with a tailor named Albert Sanderloper, aged 40, also born in Germany.

With the founding of Washington University on 22 February 1853, Roetter became a faculty member, teaching modern languages and drawing at a salary of $500 per year. Here he met up with another German American George Engelmann, a physician and botanist and advisor to Henry Shaw on the planning of the Missouri Botanical Garden. Through Engelmann Roetter became interested in natural history, and produced a large number of drawings of biological specimens. Some of Roetter's original drawings are in Shaw's Museum and "recognized by authorities as being among the finest ever made."

== Expedition artist ==
In 1853-1854 Roetter accompanied a government expedition that explored the region from the Mississippi River to the Pacific Ocean, making detailed drawings of natural history specimens. The aim of the expedition was to find a workable railroad passage from the Mississippi to the West Coast.

In the field Roetter created sketches showing botanical details for Engelmann's descriptions of cacti and pines. Engelmann's The Cactaceae of the Boundary appeared in 1858, illustrated by 61 of Roetter's drawings. In recognition of Roetter's artistic contributions, Engelmann named a natural hybrid cactus Echinocereus × roetteri in his honour, noting, "I take great pleasure to acknowledge my indebtedness to the modest and faithful artist, Mr. Paulus Roetter who has adorned this memoir by his skillful pencil".

On 11 May 1859 the Mary Institute for girls was established with Roetter a drawing teacher. In the 1860 census in St. Louis, Paulus Roetter is recorded as 54 years old, with wife Anna of 36, born in Canton, Bern, Switzerland. Their children are listed as Anna (18), Lydia (13), Salome (11), Simon (11), Josua (8), and Benjamin (1 1/2).

== Civil War ==
The onset of the Civil War in 1861 led to a decreased number of students and in June of the same year Washington University laid him off for financial reasons. Roetter now eked out his income by selling illustrations touching on the War to Harper's Weekly magazine. "Residence and Headquarters of General Fremont" appeared in the 31 August 1861 issue, "General Fremont's Army on the March -- Scene Near Warsaw, Missouri" in the 16 November 1861 issue, "Indian Scouts in General Lane's Camp" and a portrait of General Lane in the 23 November 1861 issue and "General Fremont's Camp at Jefferson City, Missouri". Roetter was a member of the Home Guard during the War and for a short while in the late 1860s was in the service of the US Geological Survey.

== Later years ==
Roetter relocated to Cambridge, Massachusetts in 1867, working with biologist Louis Agassiz of Harvard University and teaching botanical and ichthyological drawing at Agassiz's Anderson School of Natural History on Penikese Island. In 1884 he returned to St. Louis and stayed there.

He died after suffering a broken hip on his daily walk to Forest Park in St. Louis.
