= Gilbert Rohde =

American furniture and industrial designer (1894–1944)

Gilbert Rohde (1894–1944), whose career as a furniture and industrial designer helped to define American modernism during its first phase from the late 1920s to World War II, is best known today for inaugurating modern design at Herman Miller Inc.

== Background ==
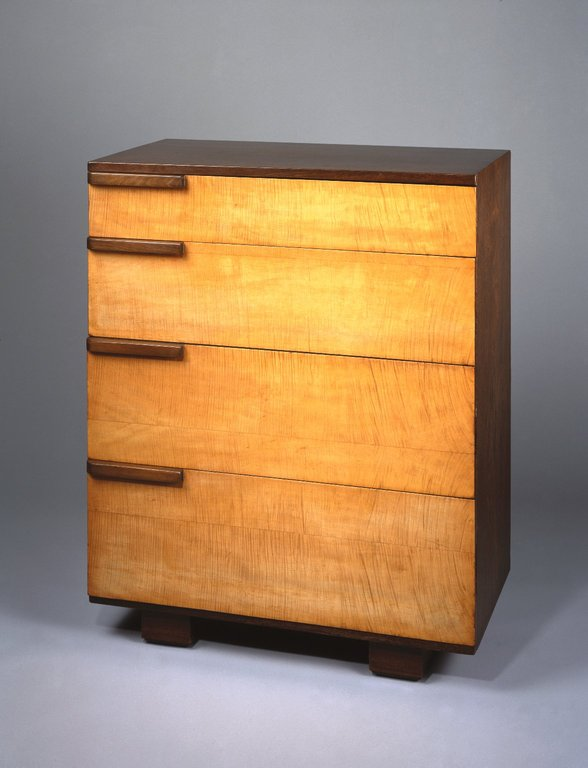
Bureau, 1933-1934 Brooklyn Museum

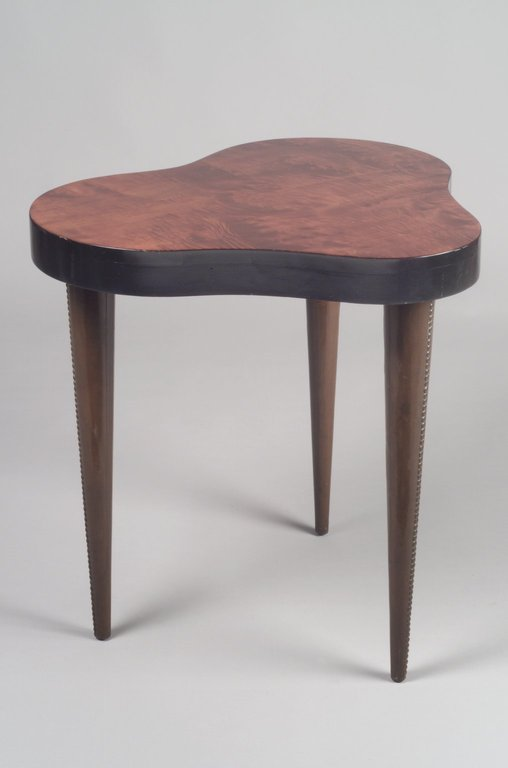
Occasional Table, 1937-1941 Brooklyn Museum

Beginning in 1932, and continuing up to the time of his death in 1944, Rohde advised Herman Miller's president, Dirk Jan De Pree on design, marketing, and production. Herman Miller was one of a dozen furniture manufacturers where Rohde initiated modern design, among them the Heywood-Wakefield Company, the Widdicomb Company, and the Troy Sunshade Company.

Rohde lived in New York City and its environs throughout his life. He was educated in New York City public schools, graduating in 1913 from Stuyvesant High School, which was known at the time for its rigorous vocational studies program. Post-high school studies included classes at the Art Students League and the Grand Central School of Art. A 1927 trip to France and Germany was the prelude to his career in design, and marked the transition from his work in advertising illustration to design. His work reflected American Streamline Moderne design, as well as trends in European art and design (he made two additional trips to Europe in 1931 and 1937), including French moderne, the International Design style associated with the Bauhaus, and later, Surrealism. His biomorphic tables and desks, made by Herman Miller, were the first examples of biomorphic furniture manufactured in America, anticipating forms that would define mid-century modernism.

== Career ==
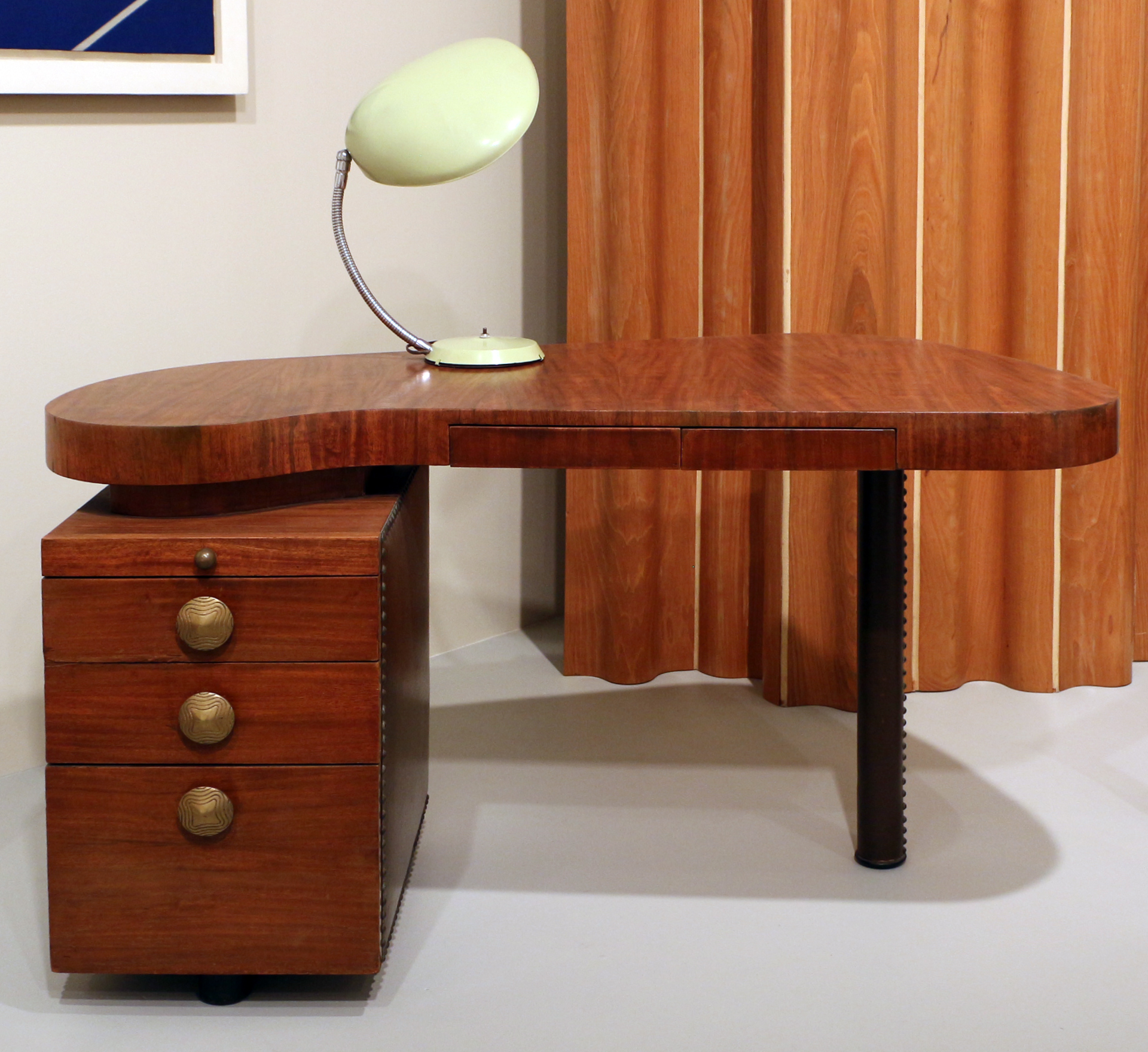
Desk model 4106 for Herman Miller (c. 1940) with Cobra desk lamp by Greta Magnusson-Grossman (1948-1949)

Rohde was a tireless advocate for modern furniture and interiors in American homes, apartments, offices, and commercial and institutional settings. He designed many lines of modular furniture, promoted for its flexibility, functionality, and suitability for apartments and small homes. He became known for experimenting with industrial materials in furniture and interiors, including Plexiglas, Lucite, Bakelite, and Fabrikoid (a leather-like fabric made by DuPont). One of his most innovative designs was a molded Plexiglas chair made in 1939, and shown at the Rohm and Haas display at the 1939 New York World's Fair. Of the two prototypes of this chair, one was acquired by the Museum of Modern Art in 2000. Rohde's work is included in major museum collections among them: the Brooklyn Museum, the Wolfsonian, the Minneapolis Institute of Art, the Metropolitan Museum of Art, the San Francisco Museum of Modern Art, The Henry Ford, the Newark Museum of Art, the Los Angeles County Museum of Art, and the Dallas Museum of Art. In Europe his work is owned by the Victoria and Albert Museum and the Vitra Design Museum.

His Executive Office Group (EOG) line, launched in 1942 by Herman Miller, was the earliest example of a systems approach to office furniture. The line's 137 individual elements—drawers, drawer pedestals, tabletops, and other items—could be configured according to individual work requirements. It became the standard approach to high-end office furniture.

In addition to his design work, Rohde taught industrial design, first at the Design Laboratory (1935–37), a New Deal program in New York City sponsored by the Works Progress Administration, where he also served as director. He subsequently taught at New York University, and was a visiting lecturer at the University of Washington in Seattle. He participated in the founding of the Society of Industrial Designers (now IDSA).

Rohde's work was publicized through hundreds of articles in design and architecture magazines, newspapers, and in popular magazines such as House Beautiful. His work was featured at several fairs of the 1930s, including the Century of Progress Exposition in Chicago in 1933 and 1934, and in the Decorative Arts Pavilion at San Francisco's 1939 Golden Gate International Exposition. Consumers could purchase his furniture at upscale department stores in New York (Bloomingdale's), Washington (Woodward & Lothrop), Philadelphia (Wanamaker's), Cleveland (Halle Brothers Co.), and elsewhere.

By focusing on design for mass production, Rohde hoped to make modern design the national style of America and to bring modern design to the greatest number of consumers.

As part of its "Pioneers of American Industrial Design" series, the United States Postal Service issued on August 25, 2011, a commemorative first-class "forever" stamp featuring a Rohde-designed clock.

== Sources ==
- Gilbert Rohde: Modern Design for Modern Living by Phyllis Ross (Yale University Press, 2009) ISBN 0-300-12064-8; ISBN 978-0-300-12064-6
- "A Bridge to Postwar American Design: Gilbert Rohde and the 1937 Paris Exposition," by Phyllis Ross in Paris-New York: Design Fashion Culture 1925-1940 by Donald Albrecht, ed. (The Monacelli Press, 2008) ISBN 1-58093-211-8; ISBN 978-1-58093-211-0
- "Merchandising the Modern: Gilbert Rohde at Herman Miller" by Phyllis Ross, Journal of Design History 2004 17(4): 359-376
