= Jeanine Centuori =

American architect

Jeanine Centuori (born 1959 in Newark, New Jersey) is an American architect, public artist, educator and principal and founding partner of the firm UrbanRock Design in Los Angeles, CA.

She received a Master of Architecture degree from Cranbrook Academy of Art in 1991, and a Bachelor of Architecture from Cooper Union in 1983. As director of the Agency for Civic Engagement at Woodbury University, Centuori has been honored for her work in “…helping students find ways to build a better world” through direct engagement with projects of social relevancy.

== Academics ==
Centuori has taught at Woodbury University since 1998. She has served as Chair of the Undergraduate School of Architecture, and, in 2011, she became the director of Woodbury University's Agency for Civic Engagement (ACE), a program that “connects students and faculty with non-profit and governmental organizations that are dedicated to helping underserved communities”. ACE's design/build work has included housing for the homeless on LA's Skid Row, garden sheds for non-profit organization Take the Reins, and multi-use structures for a non-profit equine therapy program.

In 2016, Centuori was elevated to a Fellowship in the American Institute of Architects for her work with ACE; a “significant contribution to architecture and society” which has “inspired over five hundred architecture students and impacted over thirty communities with built projects, programs, and visions for their growth.”

== Architecture and public art ==
UrbanRock Design was founded in 2000 as a partnership between architect Centuori and designer Russell Rock. As a principal/partner in the firm, Centuori has completed many “integrated public art projects, spatial environments, and public art plans for urban centers around the US and Canada”. Her work in service of non-profits has included a public art educational project and an art demonstration project for TreePeople in Los Angeles. UrbanRock Design projects have been recognized as significant with awards by entities such as the AIA California Council, Architecture Magazine (Progressive Architecture Awards), and Metropolis Magazine. Her work has been exhibited at the Pacific Design Center as part of the Association for Women in Architecture show and at the Architecture and Design Museum in Los Angeles as part of the “NEW BLOOD: Next Gen” exhibit.

== See also ==
- List of California women architects
