= Liane Zimbler =

American architect

- Portrait of Liane Zimbler
- Born: Juliana Fischer; May 31, 1892; Přerov, Moravia
- Died: November 11, 1987 (aged 95); Los Angeles
- Education: Arts School, Vienna
- Occupation: Architect
- Known for: Interior Design
- Spouse: Otto Zimbler
- Children: Eva Zimbler

Liane Zimbler, née Juliana Fischer, (31 May 1892, Přerov, Moravia – 11 November 1987, Los Angeles) is said to be the first European woman to obtain an architecture degree, although a number of Finns, including Signe Hornborg, graduated much earlier. After running a highly successful business in Vienna, Zimbler emigrated to the United States in 1938 where she specialized in interior design.

== Biography ==
Zimbler first studied graphics, then architecture at the Arts School in Vienna. While still studying, she worked as an illustrator and designer for Emilie Flöge's salon. In 1916, she married the lawyer Otto Zimbler with whom she had a daughter, Eva. The same year, she began to work for the Bamberger furniture factory in Vienna. Towards the end of the First World War, she joined the Rosenberger design studio in Vienna as an architect. In the early 1920s, she started her own firm, specializing in conversion, renovation and interior decoration work. By 1928, as a result of her prospering business, Zimbler was able to open a second studio in Prague managed by her associate Annie Herrnheiser. She also began to lecture in Vienna while participating in various organisations in support of working women. She became known for her one-room apartments and studios, an expanding niche market for the middle classes. Notable projects in Vienna included a villa in Silbergasse, refurbishment of the Ephrussi Bank and several interior decoration projects. She also served as chairman of the Austrian board of the International Housing Society and lectured on the sociological and artistic aspects of housing.

In February 1938, Zimbler became the first woman in Austria to be granted a civil architect's licence. Very shortly afterwards, thanks to Otto Zimbler's influential contacts, the family was able to leave for the Netherlands and London before the German Anschluss in March. That autumn they were able to emigrate to the United States. Thanks to the involvement of Ada Gomperz, wife of the philosopher Heinrich Gomperz, Zimbler then settled in Los Angeles, where she worked on interior design at Anita Toor's office. After her husband died in an accident and Anita Toor herself died, Zimbler took over the firm around 1941, again concentrating on conversion and decoration projects. She also designed a number of new buildings and regularly took part in exhibitions. Zimbler frequently lectured and wrote articles on interior design for architecture and design periodicals as well as for newspapers including the Los Angeles Times. Her daughter, Eva, who joined her as an apprentice in 1958, became her associate. Zimbler, who had a stroke at age 86, continued to work until age 90. She died in Los Angeles in November, 1987 at the age of 95.

Zimbler was a member of the American Institute of Interior Designers and the Association of Women in Architecture.

== Projects ==
(List is incomplete)

- Gnadenwald House, 1934-1938
- Toch residence, Santa Monica, CA, 1941
- Panzer residence, Beverly Hills, CA, 1942
- Boswell residence, Los Angeles, CA, 1944
- Dahlberg residence, Beverly Hills, CA, 1945
- Foster bedroom & bath, Beverly Hills, CA, 1950
- Barbas residence, Beverly Hills, CA, 1951
- Dr. J. Brody residence, Beverly Hills, CA, 1952
- Moore residence, Los Angeles, CA, 1955
- Stewart residence, Beverly Hills, CA, 1955
- Feldman kitchen, Los Angeles, CA, 1956
- Schwartz residence, Camarillo, CA, 1956-1957
- Huebscher residence, Los Angeles, CA, 1959-1960
- Elliot Evans Company Reception Room, Los Angeles, CA, 1960
- Candianides residence, Venture, CA, 1961
- Silverberg apartment, Los Angeles, CA, 1962
- Barasch residence, Los Angeles, CA, 1960-1965, 1975
- Engelman residence, Los Angeles, CA, 1965
- Levy residence, Los Angeles, CA, 1965
- Wasserman residence (foyer), Los Angeles, CA, 1968
- Recycled House, Beverly Hills, CA, 1974

== Literature ==
- Zacek, Patricia: Frauen in Der Technik Von 1900 bis 2000, Vienna, ARGE Architektinnen und Ingenieurkonsulentinnen, 1999. (in German)
