= Edith Northman =

American architect

- Born: Edith Mortensen; 1893; Denmark
- Died: 1956 (aged 62–63); Salt Lake City, Utah, U.S.A.
- Occupation: Architect

Edith Northman (1893–1956) was one of Southern California's first woman architects, and the first woman registered architect in Los Angeles. She worked on a wide range of buildings in the region, ranging from residential to commercial.

== Early life and education ==
Edith Mortensen Northman was born October 8, 1893, in Denmark to a Danish father and a Swedish mother. The family moved to Norway when she was nine and remained there through her high school years. She moved to Copenhagen to study art at the Studio School of Arts. The family immigrated to the United States in 1914, and a couple of years later Northman moved to Brigham City, Utah, where she worked as a librarian. She became interested in architecture and in 1918 moved to Salt Lake City, where she got work as an architectural draftsman for Eugene R. Wheelon.

For health reasons, Northman moved to Los Angeles in 1920, where she found work with the architect Clarence J. Smale and rose to the position of his chief draftsman. She opened her own firm in 1926 but then almost immediately enrolled at the University of Southern California to study architecture. She received her degree from USC in 1930 and her state architectural license the following year.

== Career ==
In a career that started during the Great Depression and lasted a quarter century, the prolific Northman designed well over a hundred buildings in a wide range of types: single-family homes, multi-family dwellings and hotels, a church, a synagogue, factories, gas stations, and other commercial buildings. She designed residential buildings all over southern California, including in Beverly Hills, Hancock Park, Wilshire Park, Los Feliz, Los Angeles, and Palm Springs. Stylistically, her work is eclectic, with elements of European traditional styles (e.g. in her Danish Lutheran Church and Normandie Mar Apartment Hotel) and American Minimal Traditional modernism melded with Streamline Moderne.

Some of her clients were connected with the film industry, including actor Jean Hersholt. She also served as an adviser on the film Woman Chases Man, in which the heroine is an architect. One of her biggest contracts was with the Union Oil Company, for which she designed over 50 gas stations along the west coast from San Diego to Vancouver. The company received two patents for her gas station designs in 1934.

Northman's two-story Normandie Mar Apartment Hotel in Fresno was inspired by French chateaux and features a steeply pitched roof, multi-paned windows with muntins, and decorative turrets and plaster reliefs. It is the only known work by Northman in the San Joaquin Valley.

During World War II, Northman worked on fortifications, hospitals, latrines, and other building-related projects for the United States Army Corps of Engineers. After the war she went back to private practice, specializing in large apartment buildings and hotels in Los Angeles and Palm Springs.

In the early 1950s, Northman developed Parkinson's disease and, unable to hold a pencil, was forced into retirement. She died in 1956 in Salt Lake City.

The Washington, D.C–based columnist Jack Anderson was Northman's nephew.

== Partial list of buildings ==
- Fernwood Arms apartments, Los Angeles (1929)
- Sir Francis Drake Apartments, Los Angeles (1929)
- Home Gardens Ward LDS Chapel, 9722 San Antonio Ave., South Gate (1928)
- Berger Winston Apartment Building, Los Angeles (1937)
- Danish Lutheran Church, Los Angeles (1937)
- Insley House, Los Angeles (1940)
- Normandie Mar Apartment Hotel, Fresno (1939)
- Villa Sevilla apartments, West Hollywood (1931)
- Laurel Manor Apartments, West Hollywood (1940)

== Publications ==
- "The Small Concrete House of Today". California Arts and Architecture, vols. 55–56, 1939.

== See also ==
- List of California women architects
