= Heywood-Wakefield Company Complex =

- U.S. National Register of Historic Places
- U.S. Historic district – Contributing property
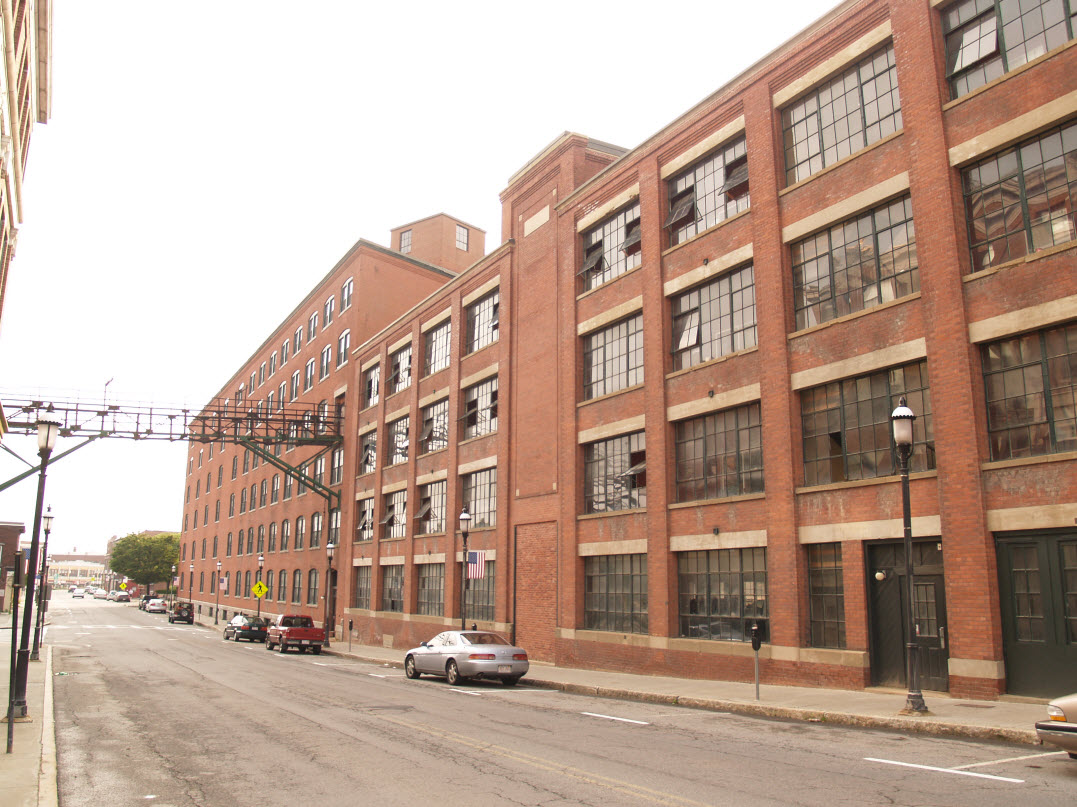

- Location within Massachusetts Location within the United States
- Location: 206 Central St., Gardner, Massachusetts
- Coordinates: 42°34′35″N 71°59′27″W
- Area: 12.5 acres (5.1 ha)
- Built: 1863
- Part of: West Gardner Square Historic District (ID85003185)
- NRHP reference No.: 83000610

Significant dates
- Added to NRHP: September 15, 1983
- Designated CP: December 30, 1985

The Heywood-Wakefield Company Complex is a historic factory complex at 206 Central Street in Gardner, Massachusetts. The complex, located at the corner of Central and Elm in West Gardner, has its origins in a chair manufacturing business established in 1826 by the Heywood brothers. The current brick factory buildings date to the later decades of the 19th century. The property was listed on the National Register of Historic Places in 1983.

== Description and history ==
Gardner's long history as a center of chair manufacturing began in 1806, when James Comee began making them with hand tools in 1805. Walter Heywood was an apprentice of his, and with his brother William opened their own shops in the 1820s. Their shop, located near the historic town center, burned in 1834. Levi Heywood, another brother, built a replacement shop on the site of the present surviving factory buildings the following year. This move, and the subsequent economic success of the Heywoods, resulted in a major shift of the town's economic center to West Gardner, where it remains today.

The surviving company complex stands on 12.5 acres (5.1 ha) on the east side of downtown Gardner, running from Lake Street in the north to Cross Street in the south. Central Street cuts diagonally across the complex in its northern third. No structures survive from the site's 1835 beginning, which was largely destroyed by fire in 1860. The only building to survive from the rebuilding program that followed is the 1863 building 5; subsequent expansion and building programs transformed the site into the one that survives today. In 1897 the Heywood company merged with the Wakefield Rattan Company, resulting in another expansion. The company suffered from competition and labor problems in the 20th century, and closed its doors in 1978. The surviving buildings have since been repurposed to other uses.

== See also ==
- National Register of Historic Places listings in Worcester County, Massachusetts
