= Kappe =

Kappe may refer to:

== Places ==
- Kappe, the former German name of Kępa, Czarnków-Trzcianka County, Greater Poland Voivodeship, in west-central Poland
- Kappe (Hinterland), a hill in Hesse, Germany

== People ==
- Nicklas Kappe (born 1996), German politician
- Ray Kappe (1927-2019), American architect and educator
- Sandro Kappe (born 1985), German politician
- Shelly Kappe (1928-2025), American architectural historian
- Walter Kappe (1904-1944), a leader of the Free Society of Teutonia
- Kappe (illustrator) (born 1995),/ Japanese animator, illustrator, and character designer
- Kappe Arabhatta (8th century), Chalukya warrior

== Other uses ==
- Kappe Residence, Los Angeles, California

== See also ==
- Kappes, a surname
