= Hernán Diaz =

Hernán Diaz or Hernán Díaz may refer to:

- Hernán Díaz, Argentine footballer
- Hernan Diaz (writer), Argentine writer raised in Sweden and living in the United States
- Hernan Diaz Alonso, Argentine-American architect
- Hernán Díaz Arrieta, Chilean writer, film critic and memoirist
