= Eyster =

Eyster is a given name and surname. Notable persons with that name include:

Surname:

- Christian S. Eyster (1814–1886), associate justice of the Colorado Territorial Supreme Court
- Jeffrey Eyster (born 1970), American architect
- Kevin Eyster, American poker player
- Nellie Blessing Eyster (1836–1922), American journalist, writer, lecturer, and social reformer
- Trevor Eyster, American actor

First/middle name:

- Henry Eyster Jacobs (1844–1932), American educator and theologian
