= Georgina Huljich =

Argentine-American architect and educator

- Born: January 30, 1974; Rosario, Argentina
- Occupations: Architect, Educator
- Spouse: Marcelo Spina
- Children: 2

Georgina Huljich (born January 30, 1974) is an Argentine-American architect and educator. She is a partner in PATTERNS, a Los Angeles-based architecture firm. She has been teaching at the Department of Architecture and Urban Design at UCLA as an associate professor since 2006.

== Early life and education ==
She received her B.Arch. from the National University of Rosario, Argentina in 1998. She later earned her Master of Architecture from the Department of Architecture and Urban Design at UCLA in 2003.

== Career ==
Before joining PATTERNS, Huljich had worked at the Guggenheim Museum and Dean/Wolf Architects in New York, Banchini + Spina Arquitectos in Rosario, Argentina and at Morphosis Architects in Los Angeles. She was the Director of AUD Summer Programs at UCLA AUD from 2012 to 2016. She has been on the executive board at the Center for the Arts of Performance at UCLA since 2015. She has served on national juries including the AIA Awards and the American Academy in Rome. Among others, she has been a visiting professor at the University of Pennsylvania, Syracuse University, Tokyo Institute of Technology, Berkeley, and Di Tella. At the Yale University of Architecture, she was the Louis I. Kahn Visiting assistant professor in 2013.

Huljich co-authored PATTERNS Embedded (ACDCU, 2010) and Mute Icons and other Dichotomies of the Real in Architecture (Actar, 2020). With Marcelo Spina, she was the co-curator of the group show Matters of Sensation at Artist Space in New York (2008).

== Projects ==
- Snake-Rice Sculpture, Icheon, South Korea
- Jujuy Redux Apartment, Rosario, Argentina
- Zhixin Hybrid Office Building, Chengdu, China
- Prism Gallery in Los Angeles, CA
- FyF Residence in Rosario, Argentina
- Jujuy 2056 Apartment in Rosario, Argentina
- League of Shadows Event Structure, SCI-Arc, Los Angeles, CA
- MOCA Textile Room Pavilion, Los Angeles, CA
- The White Album Performance, New York, NY & Los Angeles, CA

== Awards and recognition ==
2003: First Prize, 21st Century Park Competition / Graham Foundation, Chicago. Graduation with Distinctions, UCLA.

2005: Maybeck Fellow, Department of Architecture, UC Berkeley

2006: First Prize, Vertical Garden Invited Competition, MAK Center at the Schindler House, Los Angeles, CA.

2007: Honorific Mention, International Competition, Skopje Concert Hall, Skopje, Macedonia

2008: Graham Foundation Grant, ìMatters of Sensationî Artists Space, New York, NY

2011: Emerging Voices, Architectural League of New York, NY. Arch is Award, Young Emerging Architects Program, AIA, Los Angeles Chapter.

2012: Honorable Mention, Jujuy Redux, AIA Annual Design Review. AIA LA Honor Award, Collective Void Dormitory, Puerto Rico. AIA LA Merit Award, Jujuy Redux, Rosario, Argentina. First Prize, SCI-Arc Graduation Pavilion Competition, Los Angeles, CA. First Prize, MOCA Pavilion Invited Competition, Los Angeles, US.

2013: United States Artists Grigor Fellow, Los Angeles

2014: American Architecture Award, The Chicago Athenaeum

2015: ACSA Faculty Award

2016: AIA LA Merit Award

2017: AIA LA Merit Award

2019: AIA LA Merit Award

Designs by Huljich have been displayed at locations such as The Art Institute of Chicago, The MAK Museum, The Chicago Biennial, MOCA in Los Angeles, and the Venice Biennale.

== Books ==
- Mute Icons & other Dichotomies of the Real in Architecture

"Patterns: Mute Icons & Other Dichotomies of the Real in Architecture" examines historical and contemporary themes in architecture, including speculative approaches to representation. The book, by Marcelo Spina and Georgina Huljich, explores alternative interpretations of architectural communication and meaning. It has been described as combining elements of history, theory, and a monographic atlas. The publication includes contributions by Georgina Huljich, Guillermo Martinez, Ciro Najle, Marcelo Spina, Brett Steele, and Constance Vale.

- PATTERNS Embedded

'Embedded', PATTERNS's first comprehensive monograph argues for the need of closer proximity between discipline and practice in architecture by articulating concepts, drawings, projects and buildings. Founded in Los Angeles in 2002 and headed by Argentinean Architects Marcelo Spina and Georgina Huljich, the award-winning practice thoughtful research, innovative mission and collaborative approach moves seamlessly between digital and material expressions. In addition to their material and formal research, built projects include Prism Art Gallery in West Hollywood, FYF Residence and Jujuy Redux both in Rosario (Argentina) and Fluid Core Yard in Chengdu, China as well as small objects, sculptures and installations. The book includes essays by Marcleo Spina, Georgina Huljich, Todd Gannon, Marcelyn Gow.and John Mcmorrough.

- Against the Grain:

Against the Grain, features the work of three studios of the Louis I. Kahn Visiting Assistant Professors at Yale. Marcelo Spina and Georgina Huljich in "Brutal Beauty: Piles, Monoliths and the Incongruous Whole" explored ways to make mute icons through monolithic form so that the buildings were foreign to their context and difficult to read formally for a film center in Los Angeles. Dan Wood in "Boulevard Triumphant: ecological infrastructure, architecture, modernization, and the image of the city" a studio for a civic center in Gabon that challenged the architectural language in Africa beyond the clichés and nostalgia to create an architecture that embodied a new ambition. Lisa Gray and Alan Organschi in "Timber Innovation District: new timber technologies and contemporary high performance wood architecture" researched wood as a material for larger-scale projects for a site on New Haven's working waterfront, with projects ranging from bridges to manufacturing facilities and multi-family housing. Edited by Jackie Kow and Nina Rappaport the book is designed by MGMT.design and is distributed by Actar D.
