= Michael Rotondi =

American architect (born 1949)

- Born: June 26, 1949 (age 77); Los Angeles, California, United States of America
- Education: Southern California Institute of Architecture (SCI-Arc)
- Occupation: Architect
- Spouse: April Greiman
- Children: Benny Cassette
- Awards: American Academy of Arts and Letters for Architecture; Fellow of the American Institute of Architects; AIA Los Angeles Gold Medal; 30 Most Admired Design Teachers in America (2013); Richard J Neutra Medal for Professional Excellence (2014)
- Practice: RoTo Architects
- Website: www.rotoark.com

Michael Rotondi (born June 26, 1949) is an American architect and educator. He has been a member of two international practices (Morphosis from 1976-1991, and RoTo Architects 1991–present, which he founded). He attended the Southern California Institute of Architecture when it began (SCI-Arc) in 1972 and, later, was director of the graduate program there.

== Early life ==
Born in the Silver Lake/Los Feliz area of Los Angeles to Italian immigrants, Rotondi’s father was an executive chef (Italian cuisine), his mother a self-taught musician and seamstress. As a child, he would build things with his siblings and, inspired by his godfather who was a contractor, would draw the front elevation of apartment buildings on Los Feliz Blvd, "then reinvent them," imagining what the interior spaces were like. “We were always building, digging underground, digging out hedges in a hill to make a cage. We were always constructing spaces for ourselves, not out of an urge to be builders but to make hideouts.” He recognized houses by Schindler and Frank Lloyd Wright in the neighborhood not by the architects’ names, but because they “just looked better. It looked different than all the rest.”

In junior high school, he took drafting classes, where he "fell in love with" isometric drawing and realized his affinity for precision. After high school he attended the Los Angeles City College, taking preparatory architecture courses. He then attended Cal Poly San Luis Obispo, and Cal Poly Pomona.

== Career ==
=== SCI-Arc ===
In 1972, Rotondi was one of the fifty students to leave Cal Poly Pomona and attend the newly founded Southern California Institute of Architecture (SCI-Arc). Since SCI-Arc would not become accredited until after his graduation, Rotondi, like all early SCI-Arc graduates, received a certificate of completion (in 1973) rather than a diploma. Since his initial involvement as one of the original SCI-Arc students, Rotondi has been active in advancing and improving the school. He was director of the graduate program from 1978-1987, then succeeded Founding Director Kappe as the second Director from 1987-1997.

=== Architectural practice ===
Rotondi’s earlier work is highlighted by industrial concepts and materials, and asymmetry, and is considered to be one of the primary figures of Los Angeles' Postmodernism school. He began his professional architecture practice in 1973 with Daniel, Mann, Johnson and Mendenhall (DMJM), then from 1974-1976 practiced independently and in collaboration with Peter de Bretteville and Craig Hodgetts simultaneously. He joined the already existing firm Morphosis as a partner with Thom Mayne, one of the co-founders of SCI-Arc, in 1976, where he worked through 1991. On November 1, 1991 Rotondi founded a new firm, RoTo Architects, with Clark Stevens and Brian Reiff. He views RoTo as "a collaboration of people working in an open practice where ideas move about for anyone’s use without the need to feel proprietary. Authorship is less important than collaboration.”

=== Current ===
Rotondi is currently a Distinguished Faculty at SCI-Arc where he teaches design studios, thesis students and seminars on creative imagination. He also teaches at Arizona State University, where he has been a long-time educator, and lectures at universities around the world.

His firm RoTo Architects works internationally in a wide range of fields including residential, commercial, cultural, and contemplative, and has been widely published and received numerous awards. His practice also has a mentorship approach, where he is “trying to incubate the careers of the people that are here now.” The firm works on both commissioned and speculative projects, the latter being projects that were "invented" for the purposes of teaching are developed in the office, with the aim of turning them into real projects.

== Major projects ==
- Carlson-Reges House, Lincoln Heights, Los Angeles, 1992-onwards
- Teiger House, Bernardsville, NJ, 1989-1996
- Prairie View A&M University School of Architecture (Nathelyne Archie-Kennedy Building) 2002-2005
- Sinte Gleska University
- Madame Tussauds Hollywood, 2009
- La Jolla Playhouse, 2006
- Insight Meditation Society - Forest Refuge, Barre, MA
- Xiyuan Monastery University, Suzhou, China
- Ari Bhod, Tehachapi, CA
- 100,000 Stupas, Soquel, CA
- Wolf Connection, Acton, CA

== Published works ==
=== Authored ===
- Michael Rotondi, Clark P. Stevens (2006). RoTo Works: Still Points. Rizzoli International Publications, New York. ISBN 978-0847828135
- Michael Rotondi, Margaret Reeve, April Greiman (Designer) (1997). From the Center: Design Process at SCI-Arc. The Monacelli Press; Spi edition, New York. ISBN 978-1885254344
- Michael Rotondi, Christian Unverzagt (1996). MAP 1: RoTo Architects. University of Michigan College of Architecture Business Office, Ann Arbor. ISBN 978-0961479244

=== Authored a piece within ===
- Brigitte Kowanz, Fountain : Light + Space, Glanzstoff, Verlag für Moderne Kunst, 2017
- Meyer, Neuman, Rotondi, Architectural Resistance: Contemporary Architects Face Schindler Today, MaK Center for Art and Architecture, Los Angeles, 2003
- Michael Rotondi, Margaret Reeve, April Greiman (Designer), From the Center: Design Process at SCI-Arc, The Monacelli Press; Spi edition, New York, 1997
- Daniel Birnbaum, Michael Rotondi, Paul Virilio, etc, James Turrell: The Other Horizon, MAK and Ostfildern, Cantz, Vienna, 1998

=== Interviewed ===
- Stephen Philips, L.A. [TEN], Interviews on Los Angeles Architecture 1970s – 1990s, Lars Muller Publishers, Zurich, 2014
- Aino Paasonen, The Architect, Poetry + The City, SCI ARC Faculty Interviews, SCI Arc Public Access Press, 2001

=== Lecture ===
- Michael Rotondi, The 1994 Henrietta Johnson Louis Symposium on Architecture and Writing, Graduate School of Architecture, University of Utah, Salt Lake City, 1994

=== Features work, philosophy ===
- Sherin Wing, Designing Sacred Spaces, Routledge, New York, 2015
- Todd Gannon, A Confederacy of Heretics, Getty Publications, Los Angeles, 2013
- Christopher Mount and Jeffrey Deitch, A New Sculpturalism: Contemporary Architecture in Southern California, Rizzoli International Publications, New York/ The Museum of Contemporary Art, Los Angeles, 2013
- Peter Cook, George Rand, Morphosis : Buildings and Projects, Rizzoli, 1994
- Miller, Nory and Michael Sorkin, California Counterpoint: New West Coast Architecture 1982, Rizzoli International Publications, New York, 1982

== Awards and honors ==
Among other honors and awards, Michael Rotondi received the Richard J Neutra Medal for Professional Excellence from Cal Poly Pomona in 2014, the AIA/LA Gold Medal for Presidential Honors in 2009, and in 1992 was honored by the American Academy and Institute of Arts and Letters with their Academy-Institute Award in Architecture. Between 1981-1991 while practicing at Morphosis, the firm received 12 awards from Progressive Architecture magazine and 11 from the American Institute of Architects.

== See also ==
- Southern California Institute of Architecture
