= Michael Stock (disambiguation) =

Michael Stock or Mike Stock is the name of:

- Michael Stock (Michael James Tiberius Stock, born 1971), American film scholar
- Mike Stock (Michael Stock, born 1951), of English songwriting and production trio Stock Aitken Waterman
- Mike Stock (American football) (Michael J. Stock, born 1939)
