= Jeffrey Eyster =

American architect

Jeffrey J Eyster, AIA
- Born: November 23, 1970; Minneapolis, Minnesota, United States
- Education: Master of Architecture
- Alma mater: Southern California Institute of Architecture,(SCI-Arc)
- Occupation: Architect

Jeffrey Eyster (born 1970, Minneapolis) is a licensed architect in California, principal of his firm æ architecture, and a member of the American Institute of Architects.

== Career ==
In 2007, Jeffrey Eyster designed and built a sustainable wood and glass modern home in the Hollywood Hills featured in the Los Angeles Times and shortly thereafter photographed by American architectural photographer Julius Shulman. He wrote about Shulman photographing the home for the architectural design magazine Domus. In 2008 Jeffrey Eyster lectured about the home in the context of Hollywood Hills Case Study Houses at the Center of Contemporary Architecture In Moscow Russia. Photographs of the house are presented at Bergamot Station in Santa Monica. The El Segundo Museum of Art exhibited a photo of the home taken by Julius Shulman and Juergen Nogai.

== Education ==
As a student Jeffrey Eyster studied with architectural theorist Lebbeus Woods and Ray Kappe, the founding Director of the Southern California Institute of Architecture (SCI-Arc) where he received his Master of Architecture.
