= Wiscombe =

Wiscombe may refer to:

- Tom Wiscombe (b. 1970), architect
- Wiscombe Park, a 19th-century Gothic country house in Southleigh, Devon, UK
- Wiscombe Park Hillclimb, a hillclimb, situated in Colyton, Devon, UK.
