= Dubbeldam (disambiguation) =

Dubbeldam may refer to:

- Dubbeldam, a former town in the Netherlands that merged into Dordrecht in 1970
- Jeroen Dubbeldam (born 1973), Dutch equestrian, Olympic Champion
- Ellen Dubbeldam-Kuipers (born 1971), Dutch hockey player, Olympic Bronze medalist
- Winka Dubbeldam (born 1966), Dutch-born American architect
