= Kappe Residence =

House in Los Angeles, California

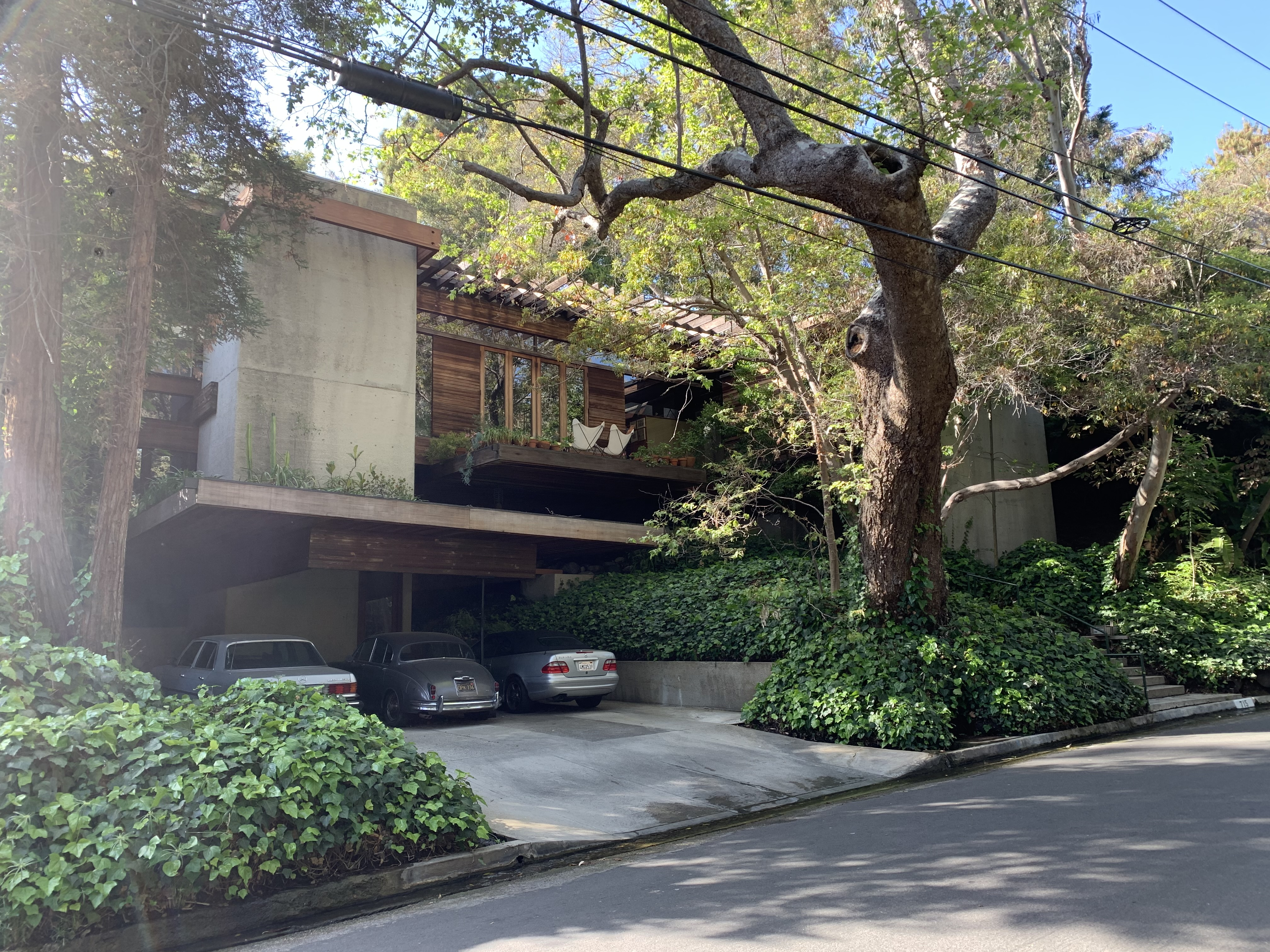
- Exterior of Kappe Residence as of April 2021

- Location within the Los Angeles metropolitan area
- 34°2′29″N 118°30′56″W
- Location: 715 Brooktree, Los Angeles, California

History
- Built: 1967

Site notes
- Area: 4,000 sq. ft.
- Architect: Ray Kappe
- Governing body: private

Los Angeles Historic-Cultural Monument
- Designated: April 16, 1996
- Reference no.: 623

The Kappe Residence is a house in the Pacific Palisades section of Los Angeles, California, designed by architect Raymond Kappe, FAIA, as his own residence. It is a modern design built into a heavily treed hillside. It was designated a Los Angeles Historic-Cultural Monument in 1996, and in 2008 it was named one of the top ten houses in Los Angeles by an expert panel selected by the Los Angeles Times.

== Design of the house ==
Kappe purchased the steep hillside lot in 1962 for $17,000. Designing a structure for the steep hillside was problematic, and Kappe designed six concrete towers supporting a 4,000-square-foot (370 m^{2}) glass-and-wood house. Built between 1965 and 1967, the house is raised on decks to avoid underground springs. The house features natural building materials, strong geometric form, and supersaturated colors. The ground floor of the structure is Kappe's studio, and the house is built atop the studio.

Kappe and his wife lived in the house until their respective deaths in 2019 and 2025. The house was listed for sale in 2026 with an asking price of $11.5 million, marking the first time it had been placed for sale.

== Critical reception and honors ==
The Kappe Residence was listed as a City of Los Angeles Historic-Cultural Monument (HCM #623) in April 1996.

In 2004, The New York Times Magazine published a feature story on the Kappe Residence. The Times described Kappe as "the only architect who truly signifies the seamless combination of Modernism and canyon vernacular." The author, Brad Dunning, wrote of the house: "Ray Kappe's 1967 house remains a landmark of nature-friendly modernism."

In December 2008, the Los Angeles Times asked an expert panel to select the top ten of the best Southern California homes, and the Kappe Residence was included in the final top ten list.

Stephen Kanner, President of the A + D (Architecture + Design) Museum in Los Angeles wrote: "Ray's own home may be the greatest house in all of Southern California."

Residential Architect magazine wrote that Kappe had "reinvented the house on the hill."

In "An Architectural Guidebook to Los Angeles", David Gebhard and Robert Winter described the structure as "a virtual tree house poised over a steep hillside" and an example of Kappe's ability "to meld the Craftsman aesthetic and the International Style into a very personal style."

In 2004, Kappe said of the house:

The house still seems to touch most people -- architects, students and potential clients. It has remained the one repetitive constant in my work. Our house became a prototype for many of my houses with difficult sites. At the time it was built, I think the house served as an inspiration for aspiring architects, and I hope that those who experience it today have a similar response.
