= Rocio Romero =

Chilean-American designer (born 1971)

- Born: Rocio Romero; 1971 (age 54–55); Chile
- Occupation: Designer
- Spouse: Cale Bradford (married in 2002)
- Website: www.rocioromero.com

Rocio Romero (born 1971) is a Chilean-American designer who has designed prefabricated homes in a modern aesthetic, utilizing kit housing to control both cost and offer flexibility for local ordinances. Her rebirth of the kit house was praised by Karrie Jacobs, founding editor in chief of Dwell magazine.

== Biography ==
Romero was born in 1971 in Chile, and moved with her parents to California in 1973, the year of the Pinochet coup d'état. She grew up in San Diego and attended university at the University of California, Berkeley, graduating with a bachelor's degree in architecture in 1993 and then going on to earn her master's degree in 1999 from the Southern California Institute of Architecture. In 1998, she designed the prototype for her LV homes, as a vacation home for her parents in Laguna Verde, Chile. The building was traditional construction and because there was a cost overrun, Romero realized that she could curtail expense and provide a more standard product via utilization of prefabrication. Her idea was to utilize the kit house to keep the homes affordable and allow construction to adjust to local building ordinances, but to offer modern, minimalist styling, using natural airflow and lighting, clean lines and balanced proportions. The Chilean house was completed in 2000 and was featured on the back cover of Dwell Magazine. While the design created a flurry of media buzz, Romero was unable to interest US companies in building her typically flat-roofed designs.

After working at several firms, including Guthrie+Buresh, Eric Rosen, Matias Klotz, and Space International, Romero moved to Missouri in 2001, married Cale Bradford, in 2002, and in 2003 decided to build her design herself. The initial house featured 1150 square feet divided into a small kitchen, a combined living-dining space and two bedrooms and baths, which became the basis for the kit components. Romero's design requires only one interior wall for structural integrity, but others can be added for personal preference. The house is fully insulated, including all glass panes, and gutters and other exterior fixtures which would mar the sleek lines are hidden behind silicon-coated metal panels. Her kit includes the recycled steel wall panels and prefabricated posts and beams of sustainable timber, the roof framing, tools and instructions. The kits do not include windows or doors. A local expert must be hired to complete the foundation, wiring, plumbing and meet local building codes.

Romero outsources the manufacture of the sheet-metal exteriors, steel frames, trusses, and wall panels and then she oversees the assembly of the components in her workshop. One Saturday each month, she holds an "open house" at her farm in Perryville, Missouri for potential buyers and builders to see the designs. After the initial LV caught on, Romero created the "LVL" (or LV large), which allows a third bedroom or extension of the master bedroom and has 1450 square feet. Later she expanded the product line to include the "LVM" (mini-LV) with 650 sq ft., a hurricane-wind rated structure called the "LVL150", the "LVG" (garage), the "Base Camp" mid-sized guest house around 450 sq ft. and the "Fish Camp" with 312 sq ft. Karrie Jacobs, founding editor in chief of Dwell magazine, credits Romero with being the first person to recognize the potential of using prefabrication to change the way architectural services are marketed. As of 2015, Romero had sold 163 homes, which were located in 29 states and 3 countries.

== Sources ==
- Jacobs, Karrie (2007). The Perfect $100,000 House: A Trip Across America and Back in Pursuit of a Place to Call Home. New York City: Penguin Publishing Group. ISBN 978-1-4406-8452-4.
