= Marcelo Spina =

Argentine-American architect

- Born: July 23, 1970; Rosario, Santa Fe, Argentina
- Occupations: Architect, Educator
- Spouse: Georgina Huljich
- Children: 2

Marcelo Spina (born July 23, 1970) is an Argentine-American architect (AIA) and educator. He is a partner in PATTERNS, which is a Los Angeles-based architecture firm. He founded PATTERNS in 2002. Since 2001, he has been a Design and Applied Studies Faculty at the Southern California Institute of Architecture, SCI-Arc.

== Education ==
In 1994, he graduated with a B.Arch. from the National University of Rosario in Argentina. In 1997, he received a Master in Advanced Architectural Design from the Graduate School of Architecture, Planning and Preservation of Columbia University in New York.

== Career ==
Spina's previous employers include Gerardo Caballero Architects, RUR Architects and Keller Easterling in New York. In 1998, he opened his own office Banchini + Spina Arquitectos in Rosario, Argentina. From 2005 to 2009, he served as the coordinator of the Applied Studies Program at SCI-Arc and from 2011 to 2019, as the Architectural Technologies Postgraduate Program. He became a member of the board of trustees in 2016.

He has served on national juries and advisory boards such as the Architectural League of New York, Progressive Architecture Awards and the Mies Crown Hall Americas Prize. He has been a Visiting Professor at the Universities of Pennsylvania, Harvard, Vienna, Innsbruck, Di Tella, and Syracuse among others. Spina was the Louis I. Kahn Visiting Assistant Professor of Architectural Design at Yale University School of Architecture in 2013.

Spina co-authored PATTERNS Embedded (ACDCU, 2010), Material Beyond Materials (SCI-Arc Press 2012) and Mute Icons and other Dichotomies of the Real in Architecture (Princeton 2016). He is co-curator of Matters of Sensation at Artists Space with Georgina Huljich.

== Projects ==
- Jujuy Redux Apartment in Rosario, Argentina (2012)
- Prism Gallery in Los Angeles, California (2009)
- Zhixin Hybrid office building in Chengdu, China (2010)
- FYF Residence in Rosario, Argentina (2009)
- League of Shadows even structure in Los Angeles, California (2013)
- MOCA Textile Room Pavilion, Los Angeles, CA (2012)
- The White Album Performance, New York, NY & Los Angeles, CA (2019)
- Land Tiles Temporary Installation, Los Angeles, CA (2003)
- Snake-Rice Sculpture, Icheon, South Korea (2003)
- Jujuy 2056 Apartment in Rosario, Argentina (2003)

== Awards and recognition ==
- 2019: AIA LA Merit Award, Casa del Sol, Mykonos
- 2017: AIA LA Merit Award, Janoian Medical Building, Glendale, CA
- 2016: AIA LA Merit Award, Victory Healthcare, North Hollywood, CA
- 2015: ACSA Faculty Award, Toronto, Canada
- 2014: American Architecture Award, The Chicago Athenaeum, Jujuy Redux, with MSA
- 2013: United States Artists Grigor Fellow, Los Angeles
- 2012: Honorable Mention, Jujuy Redux, AIA Annual Design Review AIA LA Merit Award, Jujuy Redux, Rosario, Argentina AIA LA Honor Award, Collective Void Dormitory, Puerto Rico First Prize, SCI-Arc Graduation Pavilion Competition, Los Angeles, CA
- 2011: Emerging Voices, Architectural League of New York, NY
- 2008: Graham Foundation Grant, "Matters of Sensation" Artists Space, New York, NY
- 2007: Honorific Mention, International Competition, Skopje Concert Hall, Skopje, Macedonia
- 2006: First Prize, Vertical Garden Invited Competition, MAK Center at the Schindler House, Los Angeles, CA)
- 2004: Design Vanguard Selection, Architectural Record, New York, NY
- 2003: First Prize, SCI_Arc CafÈ, SCI-Arc Faculty Competition, Los Angeles, CA Third Prize, Young Architect of the Year Award, International Award Competition, Building Design, London, UK
- 1997: Honor Award for Excellence in Design, Columbia University, GSAPP, New York, NY William Kinne Prize

Among other places, his designs have most notably been exhibited at the Venice Biennale in Italy, MOCA, The Chicago Biennial, The MAK Museum, The Art Institute of Chicago, and the San Francisco MOMA.

== Books ==
- Mute Icons & other Dichotomies of the Real in Architecture
- PATTERNS Embedded
- Material Beyond Materials: Composite Tectonics
- Against the Grain

== Other website ==
- Patterns
