= Mimi Zeiger =

American architecture and design critic

- Education: Cornell University, SCI-Arc
- Occupations: critic, curator
- Writing career
- Subjects: Architecture, design, urbanism, art
- Website: mimizeiger.com

Mimi Zeiger is a Los Angeles–based architecture and design critic, educator, and curator. She is the author of New Museums: Contemporary Museum Architecture Around the World (2005), Tiny Houses (Random House, 2009), Micro Green: Tiny Houses in Nature (Rizzoli, 2011), and Tiny Houses in the City (Rizzoli, 2016). Zeiger was co-curator (with Ann Lui and Niall Atkinson) of the United States pavilion of the 2018 Venice Architecture Biennnale and editor of the accompanying catalogue Dimensions of Citizenship: Architecture and Belonging from the Body to the Cosmos (Inventory Press, 2018). Her writing about architecture, art, design, and urbanism has appeared in the New York Times, Metropolis, Dwell, Domus, Dezeen, and Architectural Review. She is a graduate of SCI-Arc (MA) and earned her Bachelor of Architecture degree from Cornell University. Zeiger teaches in the Media Design Practices MFA program of the Art Center College of Design and is visiting faculty at the Southern California Institute of Architecture.
