= Wanda Dalla Costa =

Architect and professor

Wanda Dalla Costa AIA, OAA, AAA, LEED A.P.
- Education: Southern California Institute of Architecture, University of Calgary, and University of Alberta
- Occupation: Architect
- Practice: Tawaw Architecture Collective

Wanda Dalla Costa is a practicing architect and professor who has been co-designing with North American indigenous communities for nearly two decades. Her teaching and research focuses include indigenous place-keeping, culturally responsive design, sustainable housing, and climate resiliency in architecture. Dalla Costa currently teaches at Arizona State University as Institute Professor and associate professor in The Design School and the School of Sustainable Engineering and the Built Environment. She is a member of Saddle Lake Cree Nation and the first First Nations woman architect in Canada. She is founding principal and owner of the firm, Tawaw Architecture Collective, which is based in Calgary, Alberta and Phoenix, Arizona. She was one of eighteen indigenous architects representing Canada in the Venice Architecture Biennale 2018.

== Early life and education ==
Wanda Dalla Costa's mother is one of six children and is from Saddle Lake First Nation, Alberta. All but one of the children went to residential school. Her grandfather is from Goodfish Lake, Alberta and her grandmother is from Saddle Lake, Alberta.

In 1990, she began a formative backpacking journey through Australia and New Zealand. Although the trip was intended to be a gap year abroad, her travels continued for seven years and included thirty-seven countries. Dallas Costa earned her master's degree in Design Research in the department of City Design, Planning and Policy from Southern California Institute of Architecture (SCI-Arc) and another master's degree in architecture from the University of Calgary. She has a Bachelor's of Arts in Sociology and Native Studies from University of Alberta.

== Career ==
Dalla Costa founded Tawaw Architecture Collective., in 2010 in order to exclusively work with First Nation and Tribal communities to examine ways of re-instilling the built environment with meaning aligned to Indigenous worldviews. Projects include the Manitou Asinîy-Iniskim-Tsa Xani Centre, https://www.tawarc.com/all-projects/arts-commons-transformation (formerly Arts Commons Transformation), https://www.tawarc.com/all-projects/lambton-college-indigenous-gathering-space https://www.tawarc.com/all-projects/the-wampum-learning-lodge, https://www.tawarc.com/all-projects/lambton-college-indigenous-gathering-space Lambton College Indigenous Gathering Space — Tawaw Architecture Collective https://www.tawarc.com/all-projects/david-crombie-park-revitalization David Crombie Park Revitalization — Tawaw Architecture Collective , Port Lands Flood Protection (PLFP) project in Toronto, Niitsitapi Learning Centre in Calgary, Red Crow Community College in Cardston. She is a registered architect in Alberta, Saskatchewan, British Columbia, Ontario, Arizona and California.

She also teaches at Arizona State University (ASU) as both an Institute Professor and associate professor. Dalla Costa's teaching includes interdisciplinary service learning studios. She is also the founder and former Director of the Indigenous Design Collaborative at ASU which carries out design and design-build projects with tribes in North America. The collaborative makes connections between tribal community members, multidisciplinary ASU students, faculty, and industry.

She is on the board of the Construction in Indian Country Advisory Council, chair of the Subcommittee on Indigenous Architecture Education, Indigenous Task Force, member of the Royal Architecture Institute of Canada (RAIC) Indigenous Task Force, and member of the American Indian Council of Architects and Engineers (AICAE).

Dalla Costa is the first First Nation woman to become an architect in Canada. In 2017, she was one of six women Architects to participate in the Venice Bienniale Exhibit for Canada titled, Unceded.

== Awards ==
- 2025, https://calgarychamber.com/small-business-week/calgary-small-business-awards-2025/
- 2025 https://www.ctvnews.ca/calgary/article/calgarys-arts-commons-transformation-shortlisted-for-2025-world-architecture-award/
- 2024, David Crombie Park Won https://www.sla.dk/news/david-crombie-park-wins-pineapples-award/ for Placemaking Excellence 2025 https://worldlandscapearchitect.com/2025-wla-awards-shortlist-announced/?v=0b3b97fa6688
- 2023 https://lfpress.com/news/winners-unveiled-at-2023-london-heritage-awards/
- 2020, Trailblazer Award, Verdical Group's annual Net Zero Conference
- 2019, Yerba Buena Center for the Arts, YBCA 100
- 2018, Venice Biennale, Team Canada Finalist
- 2017, Buckminster Fuller Catalyst Program Finalist
- 2017, MacArthur 100 & Change (top 17%; invited to the Buckmister Fuller Catalyst Program)

== Publications ==
- Dalla Costa, W. (2018 in press). “Teaching Indigeneity in Architecture: Indigenous Placekeeping Framework.” In Kiddle, R., Stewart. L.P & O’Brien, K. (eds). Our Voices: Indigeneity and Architecture, ORO Editions, New York, NY, USA: 146–153.
- Dalla Costa, W. (2018 in press). “Metrics and margins: Envisioning frameworks in Indigenous architecture in Canada.” In Grant, E., Greenop, K. & Refiti, A. (eds). Handbook of Contemporary Indigenous Architecture. 2017, Springer International, The University of Adelaide, Sydney, Australia: 193–221.
- Dalla Costa, W. (2011) "An emerging narrative: Aboriginal contributions to Canadian architecture". pp. 356–379 In: Voyageur, C. J., D. R. Newhouse and D. Beavon eds., Hidden in Plain Sight: Contributions of Aboriginal Peoples to Canadian Identity and Culture. University of Toronto Press. Toronto, Canada. ISBN 978-1442610125.
- Dalla Costa, W. (2016) “Contextualized Metrics and Narrating Binaries: Defining Place and Process in Indigenous North America,” A Conference paper presented at Association of Collegiate Schools of Architecture (ACSA), 2016 International Conference. Santiago, Chile.
- Dalla Costa W. (2017) “Housing Equity and Heat Vulnerability: A Case Study for Indigenous Design and Construction.” In: M. Young (ed.), AMPS Proceedings Series 9. Living and Sustainability: An Environmental Critique of Design and Building Practices, Locally and Globally. London South Bank University, London, 08 – 9 February 2017. pp: 543–554.
- Costa, Wanda Dalla, et al. “Unique Features of Conducting Construction Activities Within Tribal Communities.” Construction Research Congress 2018, pp. 233–42.
- Dalla Costa, Wanda. “Indigenous Futurity and Architecture: Rewriting the Urban Narrative.” Architecture Australia, vol. 109, no. 2, 2020, pp. 56–58.

== Selected projects ==
Name	City	US State/ Country	Completed	Other Information	Image
Hayden Library Welcome Wall and Labriola Table	Tempe	Arizona	2019-2020	Designed and Built for Indigenous People's Space (IPS)	
Niitsitapi Early Learning Center	Calgary	Canada	2017	Designed and Built for Alberta Infrastructure & Calgary Board Of Education	
Moodie Residence	Priddis	Canada	2011	Designed and Built for Belva And Gary Moodie	
Maurice Law Office	Saskatoon	Canada	2011	Designed and Built for Maurice Law	
