= Ann Bergren =

- Born: 7 October 1942; Lincoln
- Died: 10 May 2018 (aged 75); Venice, California

Academic background
- Education: Harvard University

Academic work
- Discipline: Classics; Architecture
- Institutions: University of California, Los Angeles; Southern California Institute of Architecture

Ann Bergren (7 October 1942 – 10 May 2018) was Professor of Greek literature, Literary Theory, and Contemporary Architecture at University of California, Los Angeles. She is known for her scholarship on Ancient Greek language, gender, and contemporary architecture.

== Career ==
Bergren completed her PhD 'The poetics of a formulaic process: etymology and usage of PEIRAR in Homer and archaic poetry' at Harvard University in 1973 under the supervision of Gregory Nagy. Her dissertation was published as a book by the American Philological Association in 1975. From 1979 she was a member of the department of Classics at UCLA, and she was the first woman in the department to be awarded tenure.

She also developed an interest in architecture, and in 1999 earned a master's in architecture from the Harvard Graduate School of Design. She was a faculty member at the Southern California Institute of Architecture.

A collection of her essays was published by the Center for Hellenic Studies in 2008.

She frequently taught in the summer program at B.A.S.E (Beijing Architectural Studio Enterprise) in the Caochangdi District, Beijing.

She gave a series of lectures on her project on the Liu Garden in Suzhou at the distinguished China Academy of Art in Hangzhou, China; she came in response to an invitation from Pritzker Award-winning architect Wang Shu.

== Awards and fellowships ==
Bergren was awarded the Society for Classical Studies Awards for Excellence in Collegiate Teaching in 1988. In the same year she also received a UCLA Distinguished Teaching Award. She was a fellow at the Center for Hellenic Studies in Washington, D.C. in 1976-77.

She also commissioned prizewinning architecture: an extension to her home designed by Morphosis Architects constructed in 1986 won the 1986 National AIA Honor Award and the 1985 Los Angeles AIA Merit Award.

== Selected publications ==
- The Etymology and Usage of Peirar in Early Greek Poetry. American Philological Association. 1975. ISBN 9780674023727
- 'Allegorizing Winged Words: Similes and Symbolization in "Odyssey" V.' Classical World, 74(2), 109-123. 1980.
- 'Sacred apostrophe: Re-presentation and imitation in the homeric hymns.' Arethusa, 15(1), 83-108. 1982.
- 'Language and the female in early Greek thought.' Arethusa, 16(1), 69-95. 1983.
- '"The Homeric Hymn to Aphrodite": Tradition and Rhetoric, Praise and Blame.' Classical Antiquity, 8(1) 1-411989.
- 'Artemisia, Aristotle, and the View from L.A.' in eds. Linder and Bergren, Scogin Elam and Bray: Critical Architecture. Rizzoli. 1992. ISBN 9780847815340
- 'The (Re)Marriage of Penelope and Odysseus Architecture Gender Philosophy.' Assemblage, 21, 7-23. 1993.
- 'Female Fetish Urban Form.' in eds. Diana Agrest et al., The Sex of Architecture. Harry N. Abrams. 1996. ISBN 9780810926837
- 'Jon Jerde and The Architecture of Pleasure.' Assemblage, 37, 1998.
- "The Easier Beauty of Animate Form." Architectural Record 188(11), 78-82. 2000.
- Weaving Truth: Essays on Language and the Female in Greek Thought, Hellenic Studies Series 19. Washington, DC: Center for Hellenic Studies. 2008. ISBN 9780674023727
