= Daniel Inocente =

American architect and space architect

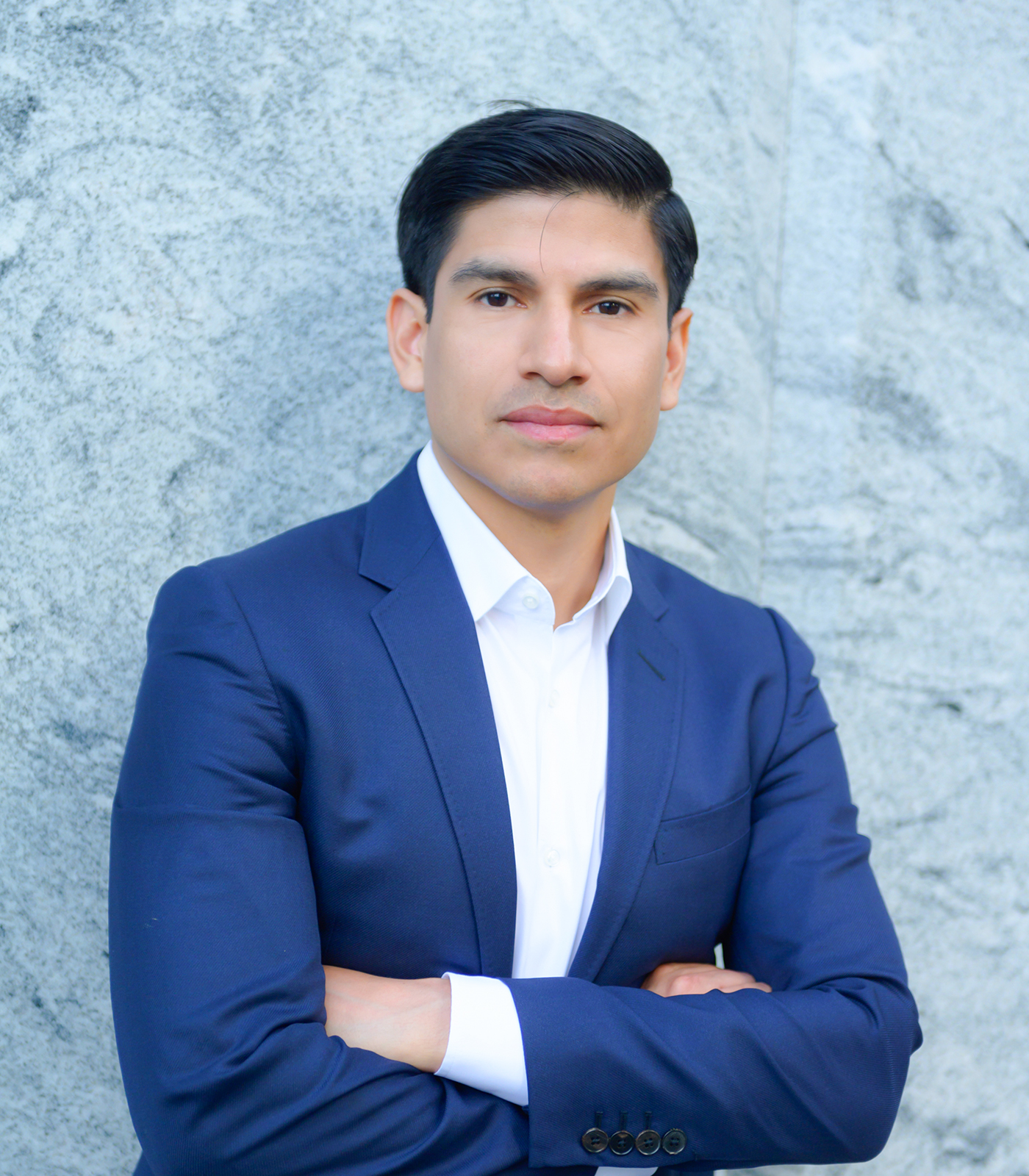
- Daniel Inocente in New York
- Born: Los Angeles, California, US
- Education: Southern California Institute of Architecture
- Occupation: Architect

Daniel Inocente is an American architect, space architect, designer, researcher and speaker based in New York City who has worked with Skidmore, Owings and Merrill and Blue Origin.

== Early life and education ==
He was born and raised in Los Angeles, California. He graduated from the Southern California Institute of Architecture (Sci-Arc). He was inspired by the Aerospace industry and West Coast architects such as Frank Gehry and Thom Mayne.

== Career ==
He had the opportunity to work with Frank Gehry at Gehry Partners, where he worked on the Guggenheim in Abu Dhabi. He then worked with NASA’s Jet Propulsion Laboratory before returning to work for Gehry on the Battersea Development and Gehry Residence. He then moved to Washington, DC where he worked for HKS Architects before moving to New York and joining SOM. While working at SOM in Manhattan he worked on several tall building projects, computational design, research and was responsible for building and establishing Space Architecture partnerships as a senior design architect and space architect. The Moon Village partnership with the European Space Agency and the Massachusetts Institute of Technology was a collaboration that lasted several years and was exhibited at the Biennale Architettura in 2021.

Organizations he worked with include, Gehry Partners, HKS, SOM, and Blue Origin. The projects he worked on include: Guggenheim Abu Dhabi, Jiuzhou Bay Tower, Charenton Tower, Guiyang World Trade Center, Zhongtian Tower, and Hangzhou Wangchao Tower to mention a few. He founded Daniel Innocente Architecture (DIA), an architecture firm in 2024.

== Recognition ==
His work in Space Architecture has been recognized by International Astronautical Congress, AIAA, IEEE, ASCE, MIT, ESA Space 4 Inspiration, and Venice Architecture Biennale.

== Research work ==
As a Senior Space Architect at Blue Origin, he worked on future habitable environments, commercial habitation systems and space architecture. He is faculty member at the Arizona State University and founding member of the degree, space architecture and extreme environments. Daniel is currently involved in teaching, space architecture, architecture, and research projects.

== Publications ==
=== Books ===
- Space Architecture: Principles, Challenges, and Innovations
