= Elena Manferdini =

Italian architect (born 1974)

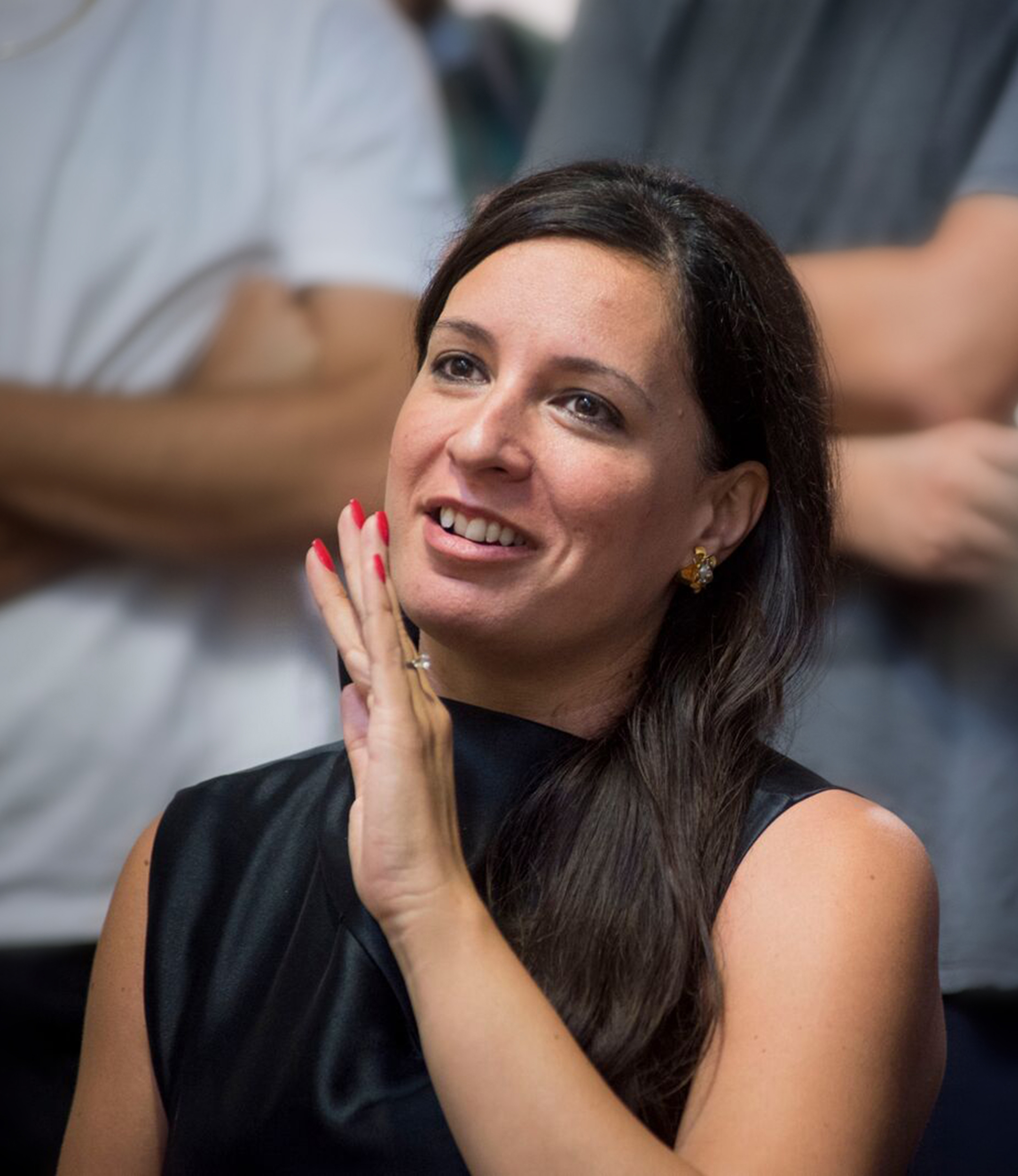
- Education: University of Civil Engineering, Bologna, Italy; University of California, Los Angeles
- Occupation: Architect
- Practice: Atelier Manferdini
- Website: http://www.ateliermanferdini.com/

Elena Manferdini (born 12 September 1974) is an Italian architect based in Venice, California, where she is the principal and owner of Atelier Manferdini. Her experience spans architecture, art, design, and education.

== Early life and education ==
Manferdini was raised in Bologna, Italy, where she graduated from the University of Bologna with a civil engineer degree in 1999 and later received her Master of Architecture in urban design from the University of California, Los Angeles in 2000.

== Career ==
Manferdini has been a design faculty member at SCI-Arc since 2003, serving in several leadership roles, including chair of graduate programs from 2015 to 2025 and coordinator of the graduate thesis program from 2010 to 2015.

Manferdini taught at the Harvard Graduate School of Design, where her studio The Dream Factory was featured in the school's publication, Inside the Dream Factory.

In 2004, Manferdini founded her Los Angeles-based firm, Atelier Manferdini. The firm is dedicated to creating design and architecture, stemming from the desire to help make places of meaning within a community. The office has gone on to complete projects in the US, Europe, and Asia.

The firm has received two AIA Miami design awards for the Alexander Montessori School facade in 2017 and the PAN Award for the best public art project in North America in 2016. Manferdini's artwork is also included in the permanent collections of SFMoMA and LACMA.

In 2019, Manferdini was honored with the ICON Award as part of the LA Design Festival, which is a prize that recognizes women who have made an indelible mark on Los Angeles, culture, and society in general through their work, character, and creative leadership, and more.

== Selected works ==
Dominion Energy Substation, InVisible in Crystal City, VA

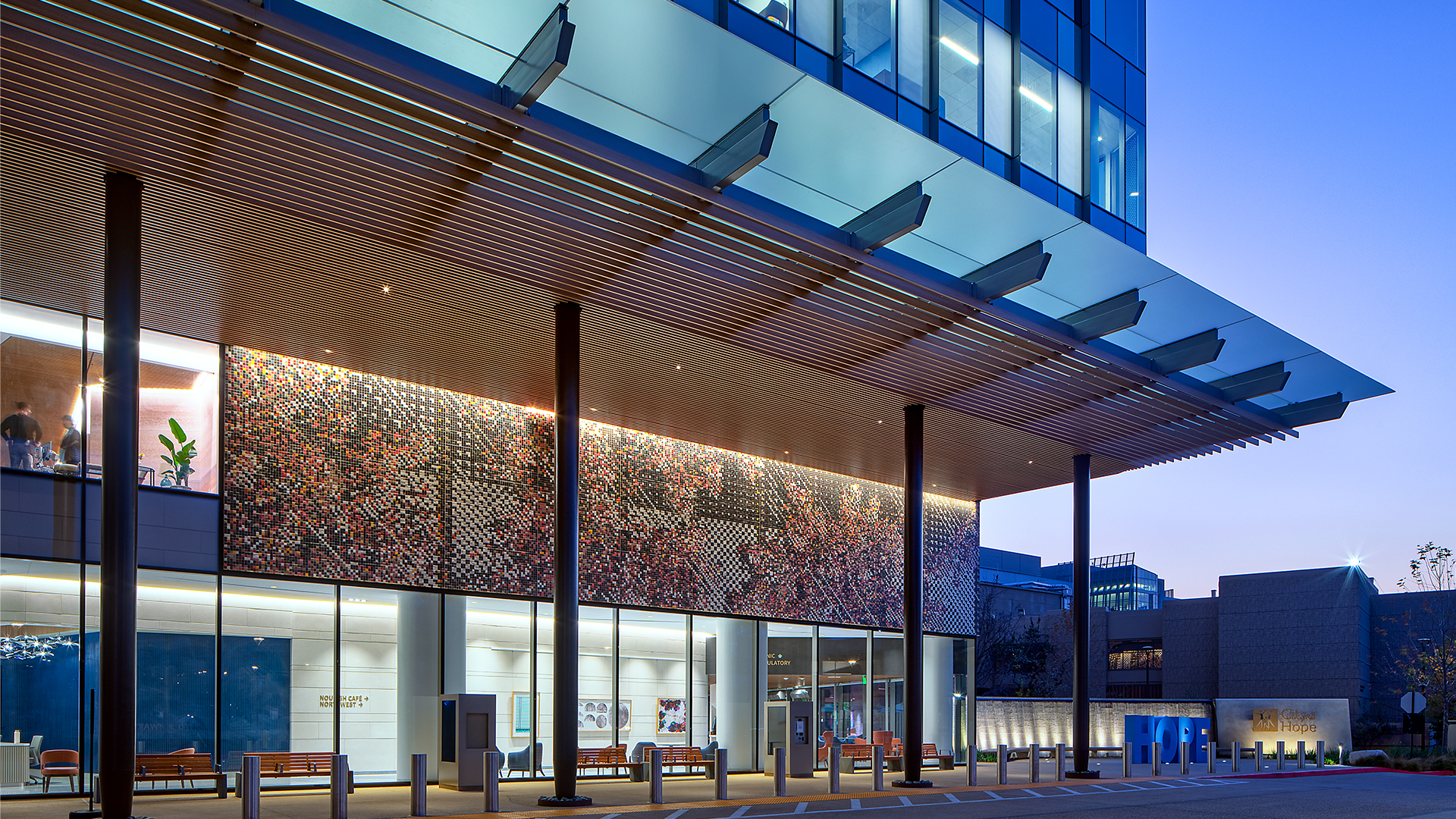
Bloom in Duarte, CA

=== 2008-2013 ===
- Nembi: a permanent art work installation at the Hubert Humphrey Comprehensive Health Centre
- Keyhan (Lake Biwa, Japan) 3 stories boat interior and exterior renovation
- Sephora (New York, US) interactive installation for the temporary museum of scent, in collaboration with 4D4
- Moroso (Udine, Italy) “Filigrana” ottoman design
- Various architectural models and design objects exhibited at the Italian Institute of Culture in Los Angeles as part of the Art Venice Biennale (Los Angeles, 2011).
- Alessi (Crusinallo di Omegna, Italy) “Blossom” Stainless Steel fruit basket
- DRIADE (Piacenza, Italy) “Tracery” cast aluminum outdoor table design (2010)
- “Works in Progress” solo show at the Italian Institute of Culture (Los Angeles, 2008).

=== 2015 ===
- Inverted Landscapes: two permanent artwork for the Zev Yaroslavsky San Fernando Valley Family Support Center.
- Loo with a View: female and male restroom with ceiling artwork for the Longmont Museum in Colorado

=== 2016 ===
- Building Portrait: permanent artwork for the Hermitage facade commissioned by The Allen Morris Company

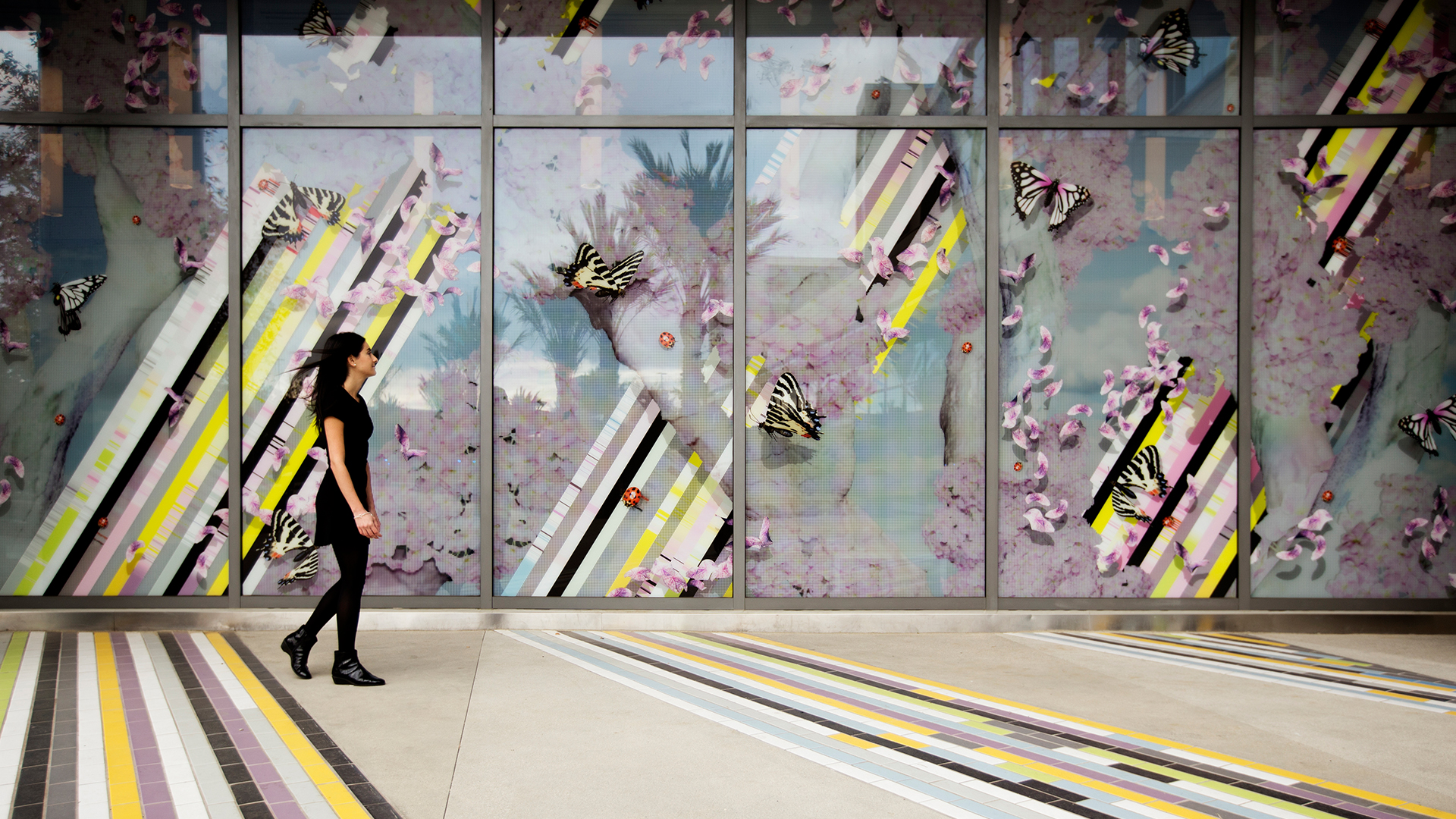
Inverted landscapes GLASS

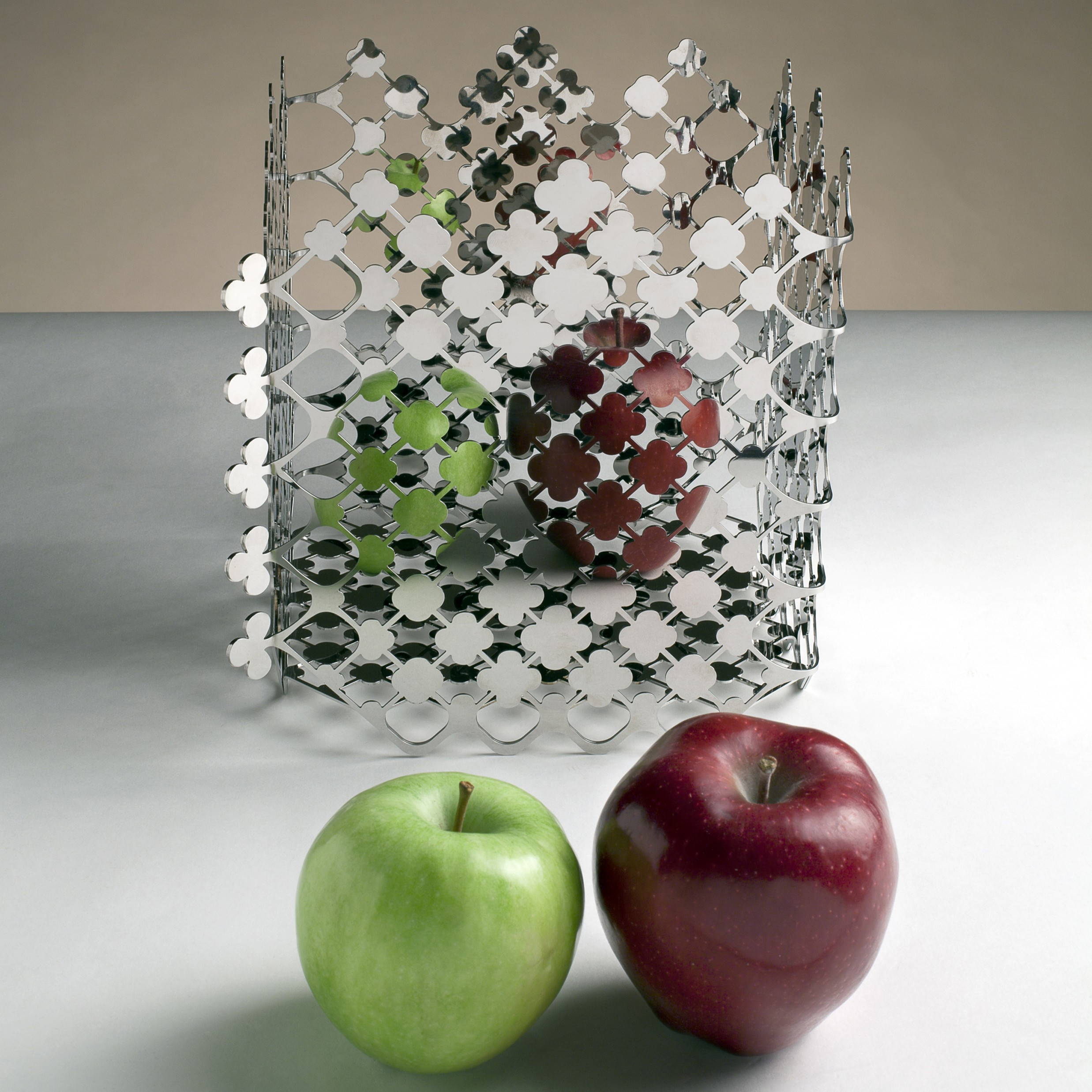
Alessi, Blossom fruit basket

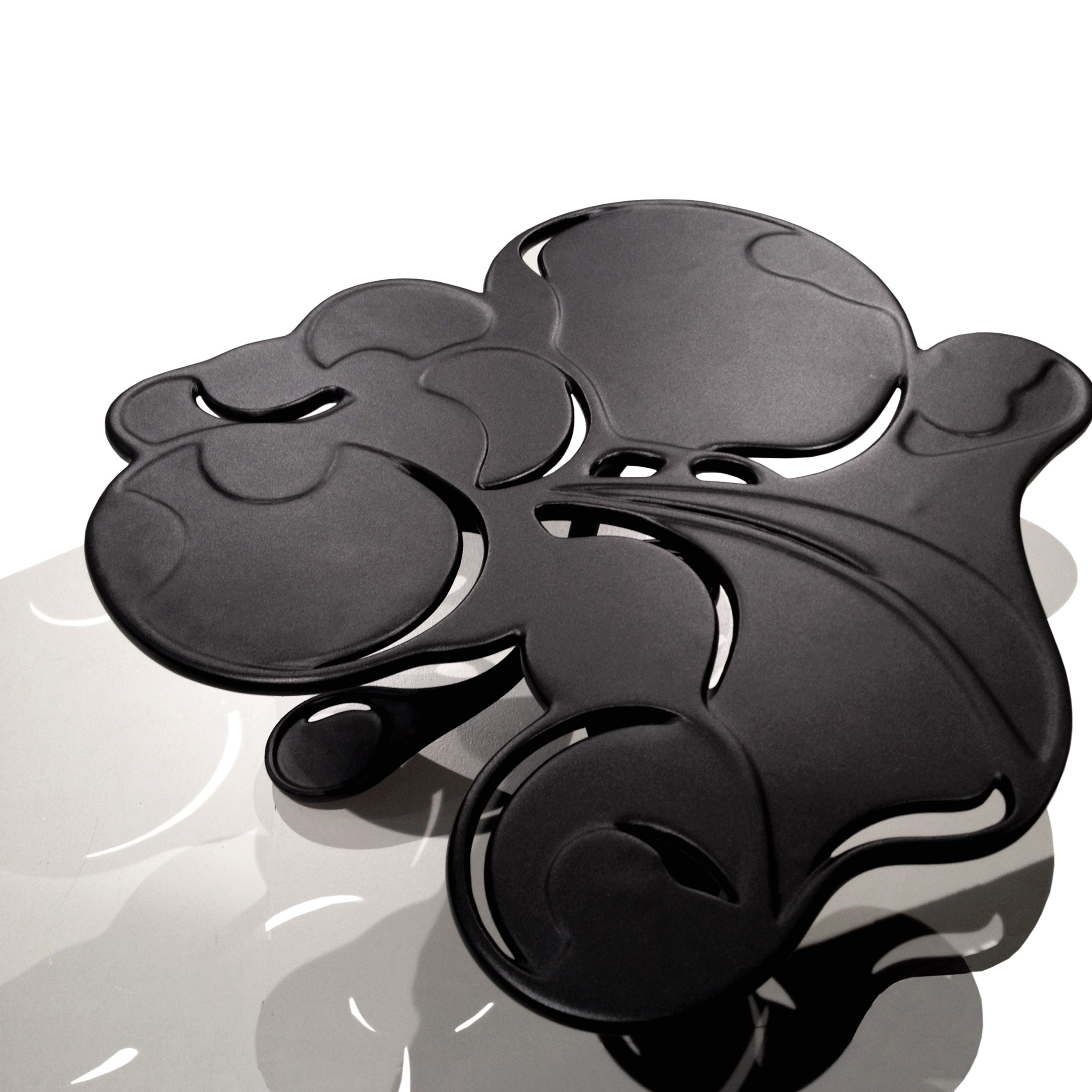
Driade, Tracery coffee table

=== 2017 ===
- Cabinet of Wonders: The gate of La Peer Hotel in West Hollywood, California, design by Atelier Manferdini is a contemporary version of the renaissance "Cabinet of Wonders".
- Hibiscus: Shading Panel design for Alexander Montessori School facade in Miami, Florida.
- Urban Fabric Rugs: 12 hand tufted, hand-carved 100% New Zealand virgin wool rugs designed by Manferdini and produced in limited edition by Urban Fabric Rugs.

=== 2018 ===
- Lane Crawford: Augmented Reality shopping windows and pop-up stores design for the 8 stores of Lane Crawford in Hong Kong, Beijing, Shanghai for spring summer 2018.
- Toco Haus: Atelier Manferdini redesigned the facade, the interior surface finish and the garden roof deck and mezzanine raised roof in Chinatown LA.
- Men Men Lou: Atelier Manferdini designed a new pop colorful facade for a non-descriptive building in the heart of Chinatown

=== 2019 ===
- Living Picture: Design of feature interactive wall, glazing graphic and elevator lobbies for Kaida Center of Science and Design in Dongguan, China.
- TWG: Teapot in ceramic and 3D printed gold designed by Atelier Manferdini for TWG.

=== 2021 ===
- Botanical: A collection of 3 hand-tufted rugs designed by Elena Manferdini for Lindstrom

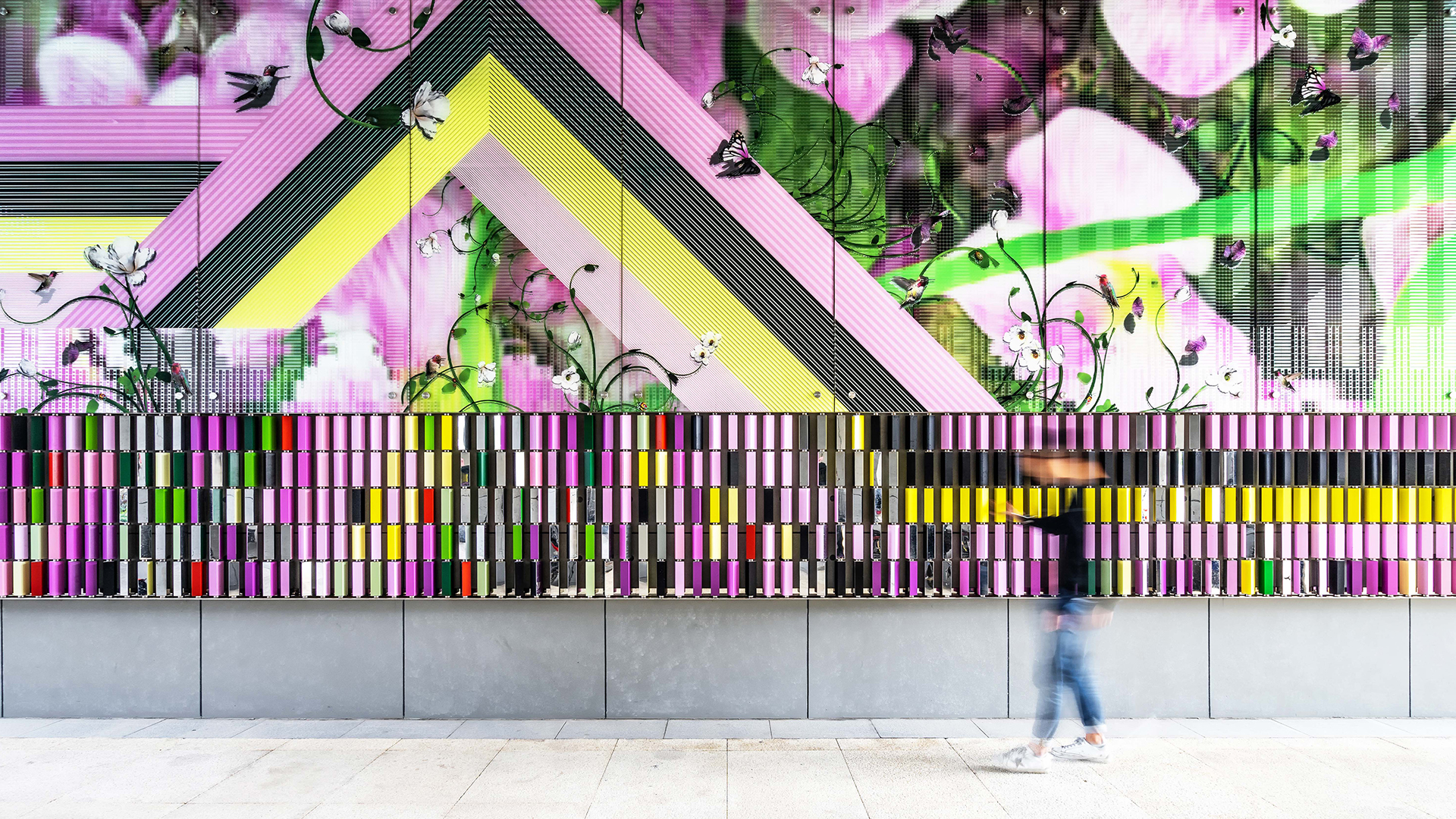
Interactive wall of Living Picture in China

=== 2022 ===
- Color by Numbers: a residential building façade
- You and AI: explores AI’s role in creative thought through 100 AI-generated NFTs and 3D-printed sculptures
- Collage Collection: a mirror designed by Atelier Manferdini for Antonio Lupi, and exhibited during Edit Napoli (Luca Galofaro curator).

=== 2024 ===
- Purple Haze and Purple Rain: large digital landscapes that wrap the two IQHQ-RaDD garage exits.

=== 2025 ===
- Rome Opera House: A series of AI-generated images and videos created for the 2025 - 26 season catalogue, covering 8 operas and 4 ballets, reimagining classical performances through contemporary digital aesthetics.
- Bloom: a permanent public artwork for City of Hope in Duarte, California.
- Cacti: Reimagining the "riccio" technique with Nuoveforme’s craftsmanship, this design blends geometric precision and organic forms into versatile, stackable vases in endless color combinations.

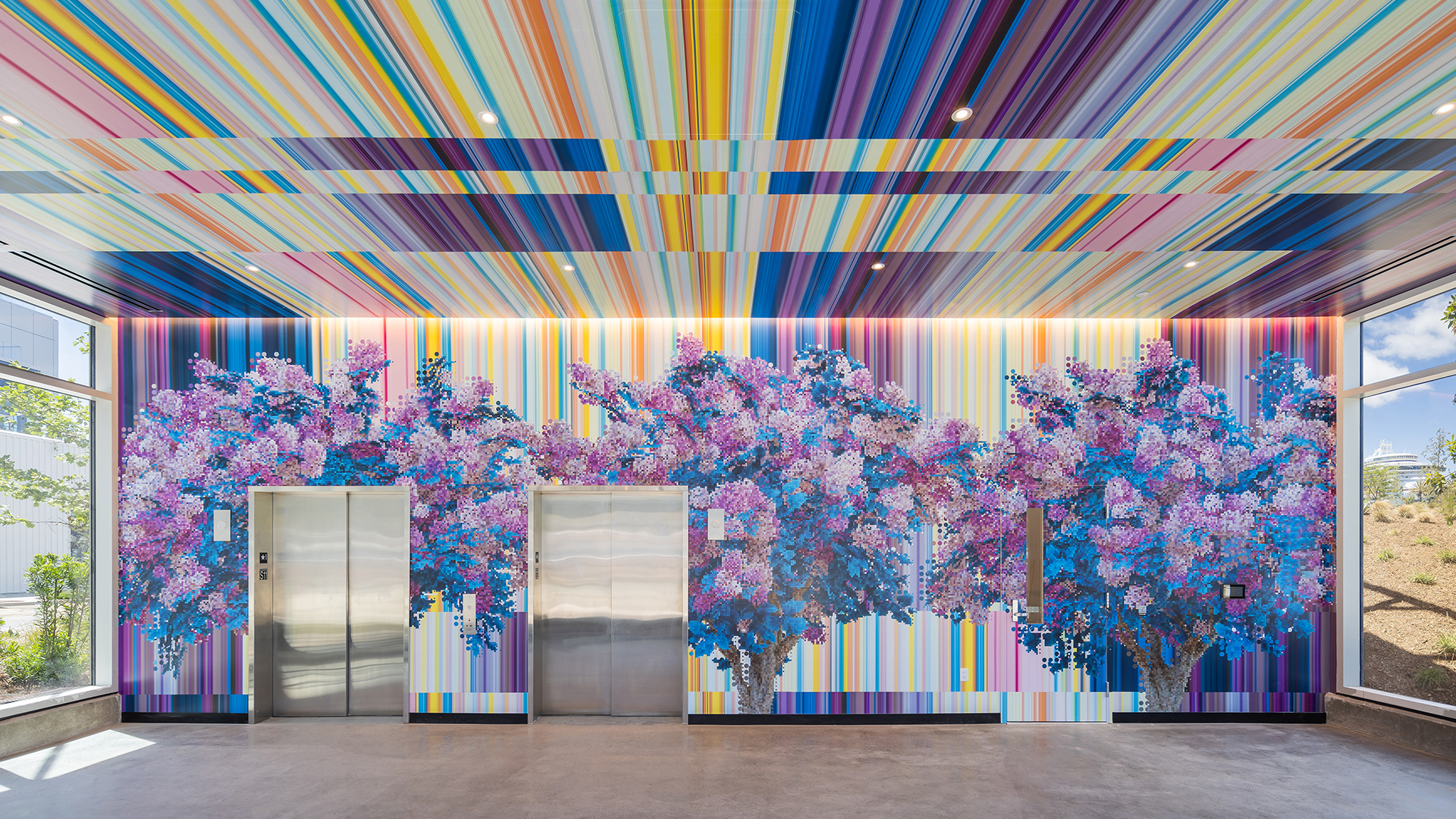
IQHQ-RaDD, Purple Haze

=== 2026 ===
- Invisible: A large-scale public artwork for Dominion Energy Substation in Crystal City, VA.
- Water Dip: a printed mirror artwork for the Restorative Care Village in Los Angeles

== Awards ==
In 2011, she was a recipient of an annual grant from United States Artists (USA) in the category of architecture and design. In 2013, she received COLA Fellowship given by City of Los Angeles Department of Cultural Affairs to support the production of original artwork. She also received Graham Awards for architecture in 2013 and 2015, the 2013 ACADIA Innovative Research Award of Excellence, and was selected as recipient for the Educator of the Year presidential award given by the AIA Los Angeles. In 2019, she was honored with the ICON Award at the LA Design Festival.

== Selected exhibitions ==
- “Skin and Bones” group exhibition curated by Brooke Hodge, various clothing designs at Museum of Contemporary Art (Los Angeles, 2007)
- "Entropy: The Art in Architects" at the Koplin Del Rio Gallery in Los Angeles, February 2007.
- An installation entitled Merletti was exhibited at the Southern California Institute of Architecture (SCI_Arc) Gallery in Los Angeles, California in 2008.
- “Lost in Lace; transparent boundaries” group show curated by Lesley Millar, site specific installation “Inverted Crystal Cathedral” sponsored by Swarovski at the Birmingham Museum and Art Gallery (Birmingham, 2012).
- “A New Sculpturalism: Contemporary Architecture from Southern California” group show curated by Christopher Mount, design of a full scale indoor pavilion "Tempera" for the Museum of Contemporary Art (Los Angeles, 2013)
- Building the Picture: solo show curated by Zoe Ryan, large scale printed installation and video projections exhibited at the Art Institute of Chicago (Chicago, 2015)
- Manferdini was featured in the exhibition "Building Portraits" at the Industry Gallery in Los Angeles, California in 2016.
- "Sharing Models: Mahnattanisms” group show curated by Eva Franch i Gilabert at Storefront (New York, 2016)

== Selected publications ==
- In 2013, a monograph on the firm’s work "Elena Manferdini" was published by Equalbooks (Seoul, Equalbooks, January 2013; OCLC 1074990361 ISBN 978-89-962904-0-7) 360 pages; English.
- In 2020, Phoenix Science Press published “Landscapes and Portraits” a monograph of the work created by Atelier Manferdini during the last six years of design activity. (Beijing, Beijing University of Technology, December 2019; OCLC 1511285117 ISBN 978-7-5713-0654-0); English and Chinese.
- In 2023, RIBA published “Full Spectrum: Colour in Contemporary Architecture” edited by Manferdini and Jasmine Benyamin (RIBA, August 2023; OCLC 1414211528 ISBN 978-1-915722-03-4) 144 pages; English

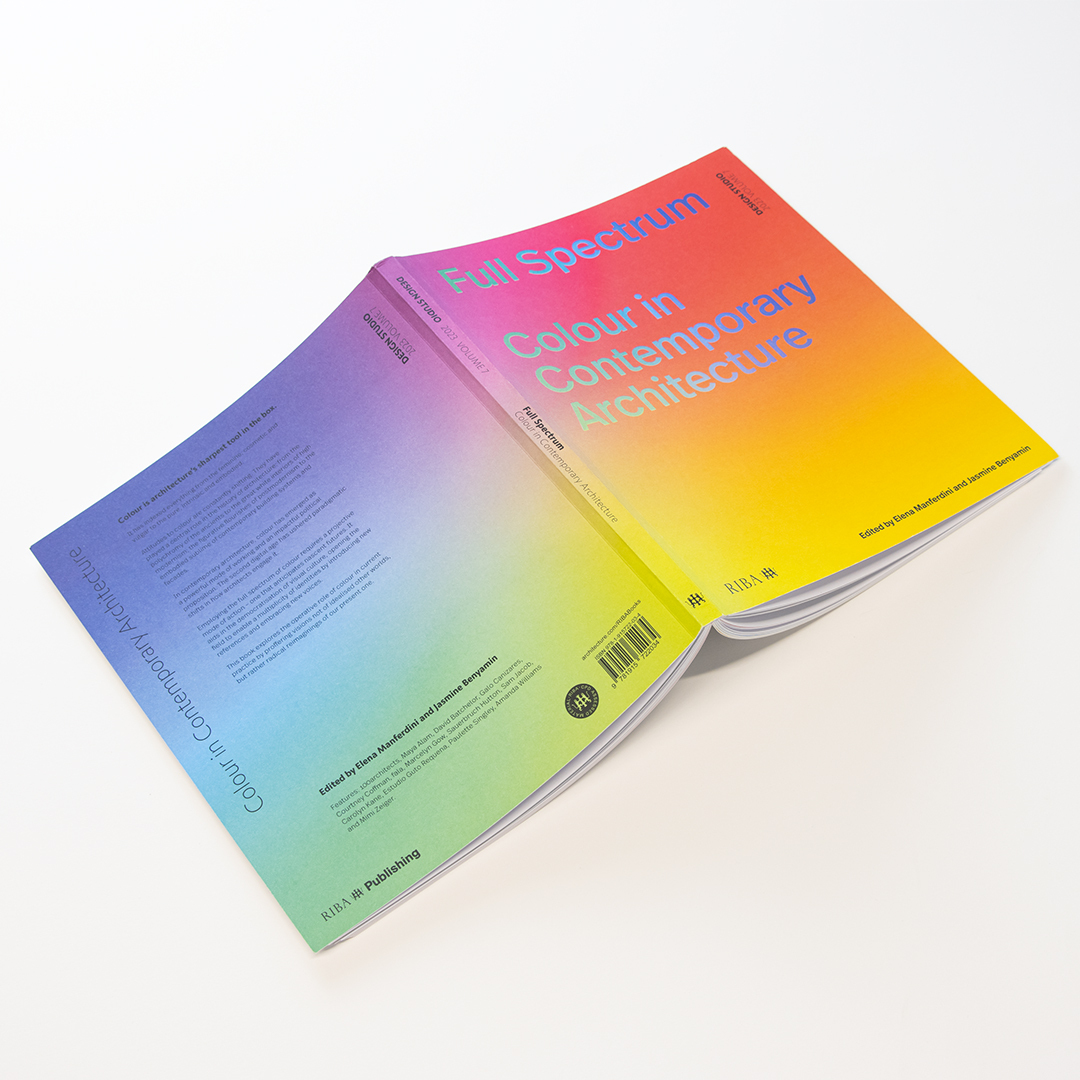
Full Spectrum: Colour in Contemporary Architecture

- In 2023, Several of Manferdini’s projects were featured in "Speaking of Architecture" by Mark Foster Gage. (ORO publishing, Fall 2023, OCLC 1415205267 ISBN 978-1-957183-18-3); 244 pages; English
- In 2023, “The Domain of Paint” was published about Atelier Manferdini’s recent years of design activity. (Mashhad, Kasra Publishing, November 2022; ISBN 978-622-6963-50-3); 270 pages; English and Persian.
- In 2024, Calibano #4 The Outsider: Peter Grimes was published
- In 2024, Manferdini’s project “Role Play” was featured in "Diffusions in Architecture" prefaced by Lev Manovich (Wiley, February 2024; OCLC 1427227679 ISBN 978-1-394-19177-2) 352 pages; English
- In 2026, Architectural Design published Chimera: The Architecture of Contemporary Utopias, edited by Manferdini and Damjan Jovanovic (Issue 2, Vol. 96, 2026; ISBN 979-8-9942982-1-3); 141 pages; English.
- In 2026, The Intelligence Age, proceedings of the international symposium promoted by Politecnico di Milano, was edited by Manferdini, Tommaso Brighenti, and Elvio Manganaro. (Mimesis Edizioni, 2026; ISBN 9791222331157); English.
