= Sue Courtenay =

Belizean architect

- Born: ca. 1966; Sri Lanka
- Education: University of the West Indies; Southern California Institute of Architecture
- Occupation: Architect
- Projects: Fort Point Pedestrian Walk

Sue Courtenay (born c.1966) is a Belizean architect who was selected as the first female president of the Federation of Caribbean Associations of Architects and served from 2012 to 2014. She is an advocate of regional building standards and mutual recognition agreements for architects of the CARICOM alliance.

== Biography ==
Courtenay was born in Sri Lanka and grew up Zambia, India, and the United Kingdom. She earned a degree in architecture from the Southern California Institute of Architecture in Los Angeles and then went on to obtain a master's degree in Business Administration at the University of the West Indies Cave Hill Campus, Barbados. Courtenay is a registered architect in Belize who has designed more than 70 buildings. Predominantly her designs are residential, but she has designed several commercial spaces for both public and private use. Her largest project was the Fort Point Pedestrian Walk in Belize City.

In 2007, Courtenay pressed for Belize to join in the Federation of Caribbean Association of Architects, in part to facilitate better cooperation among Caribbean architects. Varying standards among Caribbean nations make regional collaboration difficult and she has been an advocate of adopting a Mutual Recognition Agreement, which would acknowledge the qualification of CARICOM architects among all other member states. In 2009 Courtenay took part in an evaluation of Belize's Building Standards to prepare for meetings on designing and implementing regional building standards. In a historic selection, Courtenay was made the first female head of the Federation of Caribbean Association of Architects in 2012 and had hopes that she could continue to push forward regional collaboration. She has served on the board of the Association of Professional Architects of Belize in various capacities and in 2015 was serving as the Director of International Affairs.
