= Kappes =

Kappes is a surname. Notable people with the surname include:

- Andreas Kappes (1965–2018), German cyclist
- Anthony Kappes (born 1973), British road and track racing cyclist
- Bob Kappes, American football player and coach
- Stephen Kappes (born 1951), American intelligence official

== See also ==
- Kappe (disambiguation)
