= Gordon Kipping =

American architect

Gordon Kipping (born 1966) is a Canadian architect, educator, and licensed professional engineer based in New York City. He is the founder and principal of Gordon Kipping Architects, an architecture and design practice established in 1999. His work spans architecture, urban design, interiors, and institutional research projects. Kipping is also known for his academic work and has served as an Adjunct Associate Professor of Architecture at Columbia University Graduate School of Architecture, Planning and Preservation since 1999.

In addition to his architectural practice, Kipping’s work includes an art practice that explores conceptual, visual, and spatial investigations parallel to his built work, often blurring boundaries between architecture, installation, and artistic production. Before founding his independent practice, he worked in the offices of prominent architects including Philip Johnson, I. M. Pei, and Greg Lynn. His conceptual and built work under the name G TECTS gained recognition through exhibitions, publications, and inclusion in the permanent collection of the Museum of Modern Art.

== Early life and education ==
Kipping was born in Toronto, Ontario, Canada. He studied engineering at the University of Toronto, graduating with a Bachelor of Applied Science (Honours) in Engineering from the Faculty of Engineering and Applied Science in 1989.

Following graduation, he worked as a mechanical engineer in building services at Smith & Andersen in Toronto from 1989 to 1992, eventually obtaining licensure as a Professional Engineer (P.Eng.) through the Association of Professional Engineers of Ontario.

He later pursued architecture at the Southern California Institute of Architecture (SCI-Arc) in Los Angeles, earning a Master of Architecture degree in 1995.

== Career ==
=== Early professional work ===
While studying architecture, Kipping also worked briefly with Morphosis as an architectural intern. After completing his architectural education, he relocated to New York City and worked for several internationally recognized firms.

From 1995 to 1996, he worked as a project designer at Philip Johnson Ritchie & Fiore Architects. During this period, he also worked with Greg Lynn FORM as a project architect and project manager. From 1996 to 1998, he served as project designer at Pei Cobb Freed & Partners, the successor firm to I. M. Pei & Partners. He later joined Davis Brody Bond as a project architect from 1998 to 1999.

=== G TECTS ===
Concurrent with his professional employment, Kipping developed conceptual and built work under the name G TECTS, an acronym for Gordon Kipping Architects. His early theoretical work focused on the relationship between architecture, digital media, and information technologies.

In 1995 and 1997, he authored Ordinary Diagrams: Electronic Information Technologies and Architecture, a book examining the effects of electronic information systems on architectural space and domestic life. The publication was cited by architectural curator Terence Riley in the essay accompanying the Museum of Modern Art exhibition The Un-Private House.

The book’s final plate, Entity as Information Zoom, along with the publication itself, entered the permanent collection of the Museum of Modern Art. These works were later exhibited in Cut ’n’ Paste: From Architectural Assemblage to Collage City (2013) and Building Citizens (2019), part of the museum’s inaugural reopening exhibitions.

In 1998, G TECTS was the subject of a solo exhibition at Storefront for Art and Architecture titled Residual Urban Site Strategies (RUSS).

=== Gordon Kipping Architects ===
Since 1999, Gordon Kipping has served as principal of Gordon Kipping Architects in New York City. The firm focuses on architecture, urban design, interior design, and research-based design projects for institutional, commercial, and private clients.

Among the firm’s best-known works are the Issey Miyake Tribeca Boutique, Showroom and Headquarters, and the Miyake Madison project, both recognized for their interior architecture and lighting design. The Tribeca project was developed in collaboration with architect Frank Gehry.

The practice has also been featured in exhibitions such as New Practices New York organized by the AIA New York Chapter and The Architect’s Newspaper, which highlighted six emerging architecture firms shaping contemporary design practice.

In addition to its built work and research output, Kipping’s practice has extended into exhibition-based work, including his solo exhibition Maison de Cartes, presented in 2024 at the gallery of the Southern California Institute of Architecture (SCI-Arc), which explored architectural form through conceptual and spatial installation-based approaches.

Kipping has been a registered architect (R.A.) with the New York State Board of Education since 2000 and a Professional Engineer (P.Eng.) with the Association of Professional Engineers of Ontario since 1993.

He was a member of the American Institute of Architects (AIA) from 2000 to 2018 and served on its Honors Committee from 2015 to 2016. From 2012 to 2018, he was a member of the Advisory Council of the J. Max Bond Center on Design for the Just City.

== Academic career ==
He has served as Adjunct Associate Professor of Architecture at Columbia University’s Graduate School of Architecture, Planning and Preservation since 1999. He has also taught as a Visiting Instructor at SCI-Arc and has held teaching and critic positions at Harvard Graduate School of Design, Yale School of Architecture, and Pratt Institute School of Architecture.

At Yale, he assisted Frank Gehry in architectural design studios and later served as Critic in Architecture. His academic work has focused on architectural theory, professional practice, urbanism, and design research.

== Awards and recognition ==
In 2017, he was nominated by the AIA New York Chapter for elevation to the American Institute of Architects College of Fellows. In 2008, he received a USA Fellowship nomination from United States Artists.

His project Miyake Madison received the Lumen Award of Merit from the Illuminating Engineering Society in 2008.

The Issey Miyake Tribeca Boutique, Showroom and Headquarters received the Interior Architecture Award from the AIA New York Chapter in 2002.

In 2006, G TECTS was recognized in New Practices New York: Six Young Firms Set Themselves Apart by the AIA New York Chapter and The Architect’s Newspaper.

In 2003, Kipping received the Creative Spirit Award from the Black Alumni of Pratt.

== Exhibitions ==
- Building Citizens (2019), Museum of Modern Art, New York
- Cut ’n’ Paste: From Architectural Assemblage to Collage City (2013), Museum of Modern Art, New York
- This is Newark: Gateway Urban Design Exhibition (2009), Aljira Center for Contemporary Art
- New New York: Fast Forward (2007), The Architectural League of New York
- ‘A’ Work (2006), Häfele America Showroom, New York
- Harlem World: Metropolis as Metaphor (2004), Studio Museum in Harlem
- Residual Urban Site Strategies (RUSS) (1998), Storefront for Art and Architecture, New York (solo exhibition)

== Publications ==
Kipping is the author of Ordinary Diagrams: Electronic Information Technologies and Architecture and G1. His writing and work have appeared in books and journals including Metalocus, Retail: Architecture + Shopping, Atlas of World Interior Design, New York 2000: Architecture and Urbanism from the Bicentennial to the Millennium, and Among Others: Blackness at MoMA.

In 2020, he co-authored the essay Unlearning Whiteness with Columbia GSAPP Black Faculty.

== Media appearances ==
Kipping has appeared in television and radio programs discussing architecture, design, and urban culture, including interviews on CNN International, BBC Three, and WHCR 90.3 FM.

In addition to direct media appearances, his architectural work has also been featured in television productions. Notably, a project designed by Kipping for Brush Spa in New York’s West Village was used as a filming location in the television series Sex and the City, in the episode titled “The Cold War.
