= Michael Stock =

American media producer and DJ (born 1971)

Michael James Tiberius Stock (born 1971) is a professor of cinema studies and programmer of the cinema series at the Southern California Institute of Architecture (SCI-Arc). Additionally, he is a DJ of the weekly radio show Part Time Punks on Thursdays on Los Angeles-based radio station KXLU.

Stock attended the University of Nebraska–Lincoln, and received a B.A. in English with a minor in film studies and art history in 1992. He then received his M.A. in English with emphasis in film studies in 1995, studying under Akira Lippit. Thereafter, he went to Los Angeles to begin his doctorate at UCLA, while serving as a teaching assistant to Peter Wollen. Taking a leave to pursue a career in screenwriting, he completed his dissertation in 2021, titled ‘’Always Crashing: Automobility and The Cinema’’. Some of the theorists support his dissertation's analysis include Gaston Bachelard , Maurice Merleau-Ponty , Walter Benjamin , Wolfgang Schivelbusch, John Urry, and Mikhail Bakhtin. These theorists contribute to the multidisciplinary approach of the dissertation, which combines elements of cinema studies, historiography, phenomenology, sociology, and architecture.Scholars Steve F. Anderson and Chon Noriega served on his dissertation committee. His original committee in the nineties included Teshome Gabriel, Vivian Sobchack, and Wollen.

As a scholar, his research interests include horror, science fiction, cyberpunk, time travel, apocalyptic films, animation, anime, world cinemas and film and architecture. He has taught courses such as “The History of Comic Books”, “The History of Punk”, as well as “The History of the Future.” He has taught previously at UC Irvine (2005-2007), Loyola Marymount University (2006-2009), California Institute of the Arts (2010-2012), and SCI-Arc since 2015. He also teaches at Pepperdine University.

At SCI-Arc, in addition to teaching, he is the programmer and presenter for the cinema series, which includes discussions related to film, architecture, technology and visual culture. Past guests have included Richard Kelly, Timothy Morton and Jan Harlan. He had programmed film nights at Cinefamily from 2009 to 2013.

Stock first started deejaying live at the Silverlake Lounge in 2004. Since 2005, Stock has also been a DJ for the weekly dance night called Part Time Punks on Sundays (which he co-founded with Ben White of GoGoGo Airheart) at the Echo in Los Angeles. In addition, he deejays Punky Reggae on Fridays at La Cita bar in Los Angeles.

In 2015, his published his first graphic novel, Penny Dora & The Wishing Box. He is currently completing his first book, Always Crashing: Automobility and the Cinema, based on his dissertation at UCLA.
