= Hernan Diaz Alonso =

Hernán Díaz Alonso
- Born: 1969; Buenos Aires, Argentina
- Education: SCI-Arc
- Occupations: Architect, designer, educator
- Children: 2
- Practice: HDA-x (formerly Xefirotarch), Los Angeles
- Website: xefirotarch.com

Hernán Díaz Alonso (Buenos Aires, 1969) is an Argentine-American architect.

He is Founder and Principal of Los Angeles–based design practice HDA-X(formerly Xefirotarch) and was Director/Chief Executive Officer of SCI-Arc from 2015 to 2025, in Los Angeles. He is an Argentine architect, designer, and educator widely credited for spearheading the transition of SCI-Arc to digital technologies, playing a key role in shaping the school's graduate curriculum in the past decade. As SCI-Arc director (2015-2025), he oversaw the direction of an institution with more than 500 students and 80 faculty members, many of whom are well known in the fields of architecture and design. Along with his leadership at SCI-Arc, Díaz Alonso is principal of the Los Angeles–based firm HDA-X, known for producing grotesque and sometimes unsettling work that challenges responses to environment. Additionally, Díaz Alonso has been named winner of the 2005 MoMA PS1's Young Architects Program (YAP), the AR+D Award for Emerging Architecture, and an honorable mention in the 2013 P/A Awards.

== Biography ==
Díaz Alonso was born in Buenos Aires, Argentina in 1969, and holds a Master's in Advanced Architecture Design from the Graduate School of Architecture, Planning and Preservation (GSAPP) at Columbia University in New York City, and a Bachelor of Architecture from the National University of Rosario, Argentina. Before moving to Los Angeles, Díaz Alonso worked for architect Peter Eisenman as a senior designer with Eisenman Architects in New York City. He founded his design practice, HDA-x (formerly Xefirotarch) in Los Angeles in 2001, and he currently serves as Principal of the firm. Díaz Alonso began teaching at SCI-Arc in Los Angeles in 2001 as design studio faculty, and served as Coordinator of the Graduate Thesis program from 2007 to 2010, and Graduate Programs Chair from 2010 to 2015. He was appointed SCI-Arc Director and CEO in September 2015, and continued in the role until August 2025. Díaz Alonso has also taught at Columbia University's GSAPP from 2004 to 2011, and is the studio head professor for the "Excessive" post-graduate program at the University of Applied Arts Vienna, Austria. He held visiting professorship appointments at Yale University, where he served as the Louis I. Kahn Visiting Assistant Professorship of Architectural Design in 2010, and as Eero Saarinen Professor of Architectural Design in 2015.

== Competitions and awards ==
Over the course of his career as an architect and educator, Díaz Alonso has earned accolades for his leadership and innovation, and his ability to build partnerships among varied constituencies. In 2005, he was the winner of MoMA PS1's Young Architects Program (YAP) competition, and in 2012 he received the "Educator of the Year" Award from the Los Angeles chapter of the American Institute of Architects (AIA|LA). Most recently, he won the 2013 AR+D Award for Emerging Architecture and an Honorable Mention in the 2013 Progressive Architecture Awards for his design of the Thyssen Bornamiza Pavilion/Museum in Patagonia, Argentina. Díaz Alonso was named by DesignIntelligence as one of their 25 Most Admired Educators for 2018-2019 and won the American Academy of Arts and Letters Architecture Award in 2019.
