= Center of Contemporary Architecture =

Russian cultural non-governmental organization

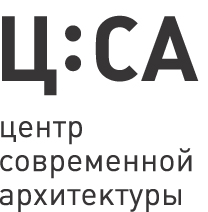
C:CA logo

The Center of Contemporary Architecture (C:CA) was founded in Moscow in 2001 by the Russian Academy for Architectural and Building Science, Moscow Architectural Institute (MArchI), Moscow Art History Institute and Architectural Gallery as a cultural non-governmental organization.

C:CA advocates for a cultural focus on the quality architecture rather than a focus on real estate value. The C:CA aims to promote Russian architecture throughout the world.

The main C:CA tasks are:

- to support of the innovative ways in Russian architecture
- to stimulate the creative potential of Russian architects
- to draw public attention to architectural problems
- to spread currently absent knowledge of architectural masterpieces in the global architectural information exchange
- to develop international professional connections, supporting the architectural community of Russian province.

C:CA is a non-governmental and non profit organization, supported by Ford Foundation and other organizational and private sponsors. Irina Korobina heads C:CA since 2001, when she was appointed as a Director.

== Initiatives ==
=== Architecture on TV ===
This one of priority directions of activity C:CA activity. Within four years C:CA run out the weekly TV show "Architectural gallery", author Irina Korobina. Broadcast on Cultural TV Channe. 150 episodes have run as part of the series in the last four years, focusing on such issues as urban development analysis of European cities (especially Moscow), portraits of the world’s and Russia’s star architects, information on architectural events in Moscow and international events such as the Venice Biennale and the Pritzker Prize, a report on the most important buildings of the 1920s.
