= Winka Dubbeldam =

Dutch-American architect (born July 5, 1960)

- Born: 1960 (age 65–66)
- Occupation: Architectural Designer
- Years active: 1994–present
- Notable work: As founder of Archi-Tectonics, Pro Bono Project in Monrovia, Greenwich Building and V33 building in New York, American Loft Building in Philadelphia, National Building Museum's 2004 exhibition on Masonry variations, Aida's House of Beauty in Manhattan.
- Website: www.archi-tectonics.com

Winka Dubbeldam (born 1960) is a Dutch architectural designer and academic. Since September 1, 2025 she has served as director and chief executive officer of the Southern California Institute of Architecture. After her education in architectural design at Columbia University, she established her own firm, Archi-Tectonics (with 15 employees), in 1994 in New York City. Her use of a combination of sustainable materials, innovative and inventive building methods with adoption of digital techniques has been recognized and awarded by major institutions. She is a Professor and Chair of architecture at the University of Pennsylvania. She is the RIBA External Examiner for the Bartlett UCL London [2018-2022], the Creative Director for the Venice Biennale Virtual Italian Pavilion [2021]. Her Ted talk “Crowdfunding Urban Planning” was in TED Global in Edinburgh Scotland 2013.

Her debut in building design was a residential house whose exhibits were displayed at the Museum of Modern Art (MoMA). In 2004, Esquire magazine named her "Best and Brightest". Her designs have also been exhibited in the Venice Biennale, MoMa, Storefront, and Aedes Berlin in 2019, among others

== Biography ==
Dubbeldam was born in 1960 in the Netherlands. Her father headed a Dutch organization connected with police and fire services. After her initial schooling in the Netherlands, she studied architecture at the Institute of Higher Professional Architectural Education, Rotterdam, in 1990 and obtained a Master of Architecture degree. She then moved to New York in 1990 to study architecture at the Columbia University where the digital revolution in architecture was in a nascent state of evolution. She obtained her Master of Architecture in advanced architectural design from this university in 1992. From 1992 to 1994 she worked with Peter Eisenman on projects which she termed as "investigations". She then established her own firm in New York, Archi-Tectonics, in 1994 and since then has been engaged in designing commercial and residential projects.

Dubbeldam, 6 feet (1.8 m) tall, generally attired in black, resides in her house which has black walls (which she says is "a little experiment"), with interior furnishings in black and white with tinge of purple shade.

== Projects ==
Some of the key projects handled by Dubbeldam and her firm Archi-Tectonics are: The Greenwich Building and V33 building in New York City; the Ports1961 group "retail store" in Paris, London and Shanghai; the American Loft tower in Philadelphia, a 14 floor building of 60,000 square feet (5,600 m^{2}) area, completed in 2009, which has 40 residential flats; a "pro-bono" design in Monrovia, Liberia for an orphanage for the MacDella Cooper Foundation and school in Liberia, and a design-research project for Downtown Bogota Liberia built with indigenous material like bamboo mats woven into the walls and hollow concrete blocks; the Yulin Design (a competition she won) in China; the "breathing" Holon Tower premiered in Paris and presented the "Augmented Reality" at the Gallery R'Pure in New York; the GW497 building with 11 floors covering an area of 80,000 square feet (7,400 m^{2}) with a frontage of folded glass curtain wall (wave-like glass curtain wall) said to be the first "parametric design" developed by 3-D computer model; the Abu Dhabi Central Plaza Project completed in 2009 with a 50-floor hotel tower and 55-floor office tower; and the Aida's House of Beauty built in a narrow space in Manhattan with a blue-stone facade with an area of 2,000 square feet (190 m^{2}) with "scissors-and-comb motif" on the salon's facade. Her firm won the "Design Competition for a Sustainable Neighborhood and Farmers Market" on Staten Island, New York.

Another interesting project Dubbeldam designed is for the National Building Museum's 2004 exhibition on the theme of masonry variations. For this project she adopted materials like bricks, lightweight concrete blocks, stone and terrazo for the structural components. The exhibit was created by her, like the other three architects who were also assigned this task. She created a "fluid concrete gorge", like the Buckskin Gulch at Utah's Paria canyon. She adopted advanced digital analysis for the chamber in which it was built and the concrete was evolved with a fourth dimension by hanging speakers above the irregular shape of concrete which panned the surfaces. The "scrambled sound waves reorganized as they hit any surface and thus emitted unusual pulses that bounced off and around the shapes, converting the entire assembly into an extraordinary, almost theatrical phantasmagorical sound garden".

Her firm has also created masterplans like the 116-acre 2022 Asian Games Park in Hangzhou.

== Awards ==
2023 CTBUH Award of Excellence for the Asian Games 2022 Masterplan

2023 ARCHITIZER A+ AWARD – For the Asian Games 2022 Masterplan // Jury Winner, Architecture + Innovation Category

2023 ARCHITIZER A+ AWARD – For the Asian Games Valley Village Mall // Finalist, Commercial Category

2022 AIA Award for the 512GW Townhouse and Climate Skin

2022 CIES Lighting Award, China – Gongshu Canal Sports Park

2022 Luban Award – Hangzhou Canal Sports Park and Hangzhou Fitness Centre

2021 First Prize in the 9th “Longtu Cup” National BIM Contest by the China Graphics Society for the Asian Games 2022 Masterplan and Buildings

2021 DEZEEN - TWENTY-TWO WOMEN ARCHITECTS AND DESIGNERS YOU SHOULD KNOW

2021 ARCHITIZER - 100 WOMEN TO WATCH IN ARCHITECTURE

2020 ARCHITIZER A+ AWARD – For the Asian Games 2022, masterplan & stadiums // Popular Vote

Rethinking The Future Award 2020: Awardee for “Housing Over 5 Floors (Built)” focused on innovation and sustainability for 512GW Townhouse in SoHo, NYC

2019 PLAN Magazine Italy: Award for Masterplan “Sports and Leisure” for Asian Games 2022 Sports Park, and stadiums in Hangzhou, China

2006 IIDA / Metropolis Smart Environments Award

2001 "Emerging Voice" Award

== Publications & Recent Research ==
Dubbeldam's published monographs are the Winka Dubbeldam, Architect published by 010 Publishers, Rotterdam in 1996, and the AT-INdex published by Princeton Press, New York in 2006. These have been republished in many international journals.

“Strange Objects, New Solids and Massive Things” with Actar Publishers, Spain, design WSDIA, edited by Original Copy, published in 2021.

2023 Springer Publication: Natures: Resources & Presentation Paper: Synthetic Natures, presented at UIA World Congress of Architects Copenhagen 2023

"Morphosis" in M3 Morphosis Modeled Works: Archive [1978- 2022] by Thom Mayne

"Synthetic Natures" in Building Futures published by Wiley UK, edited by Richard Garber

“2023 Asian Games Hybrid Stadium is inspired by ancient Chinese artifact.” in Domus Magazine, Italy

"Archi-Tectonics’ Asian Games Eco-Park is Hybrid by Nature” in Azure Magazine, Canada

2022 ACADIA Hybrids & Haecceities at UPENN – Organizer & Panel Speaker

Contemporary Architecture: Masterpieces Around the World by Braun Publishing – Asian Games Hybrid Stadium & Concert Hall.

The Plan Magazine, WD Guest Editor: Introduction Article “Synthetic Natures.”

The Plan: International Panorama Vol. 2 – Architectures from Everywhere. 512GW Townhouse, from industrial to residential, NYC

Financial Times the Netherlands - Interview with Winka by Noordermeer

111 Inception by Anna Bates

== Professional services ==
- On Editorial Board PLAN Magazine

- External Examiner RIBA for Bartlett UCL London

- Creative Director for the 17th Venice Architecture Biennale 2021: for City X at the Virtual Italian Pavilion

== Exhibitions ==
Dubbeldam has participated in exclusive exhibitions in Form Zero Gallery in Los Angeles during 1994, in the Kunsthal in Rotterdam in 1996, in the Frederieke Taylor Gallery under the title "From HardWare to SoftForm" in Chelsea, New York in 2002, and the Art & Idea Gallery in Mexico City during 2004. Her firm participated in the exhibitions of the Museum of Modern Art such as "The Unprivate House" in 1999 and the "Young Architects" in 2001, and the "Max Protetch Exhibit" for a project of the World Trade Center in 2001, which was part of the Venice Biennale in 2002. Archi-tectonics also took part in the Venice Biennale "Arsenale exhibit" during 2004. She was the curator of The Progressive Architecture Network (PAN), which was exhibited in the Taylor Gallery during October–November 2006. More recently she worked on other exhibitions such as: Never Built New York: Featured Archi‐Tectonics’ SoHo Hotel Project in 2017 at the Queens Museum, PLAN Gallery in Milan, Italy: The Architect Series – Solo Exhibit in 2018, AEDES Berlin, Solo exhibit Archi‐Tectonics: Flatlands and Massive Things in Aedes Berlin Germany in 2019.

== Bibliography ==
- Dubbeldam, Winka; Mertins, Detlef; Speaks, Michael; Archi-Tectonics (2006). AT-INdex: Winka Dubbeldam. Princeton Architectural Press. ISBN 978-1-56898-535-0.
- Dubbeldam, Winka. “Text Message.” Metropolis Volume, no. 30 (Feb 2011): p 84.
- Raskin, Laura. “Winka Dubbeldam.” Architectural Review, no. 201 (Oct 2013): p 24.
