= Tom Wiscombe =

American architect

- Born: April 4, 1970 (age 56); La Jolla, California, United States
- Citizenship: American
- Occupation: Architect
- Years active: 1993 to present
- Known for: Speculative Realism and contemporary architecture
- Notable work: Kinmen Passenger Service Center; The Main Museum of Los Angeles Art
- Website: tomwiscombe.com

Tom Wiscombe (born April 4, 1970) is an American architect based in Los Angeles, California. His work has been influenced by contemporary ecological theory.

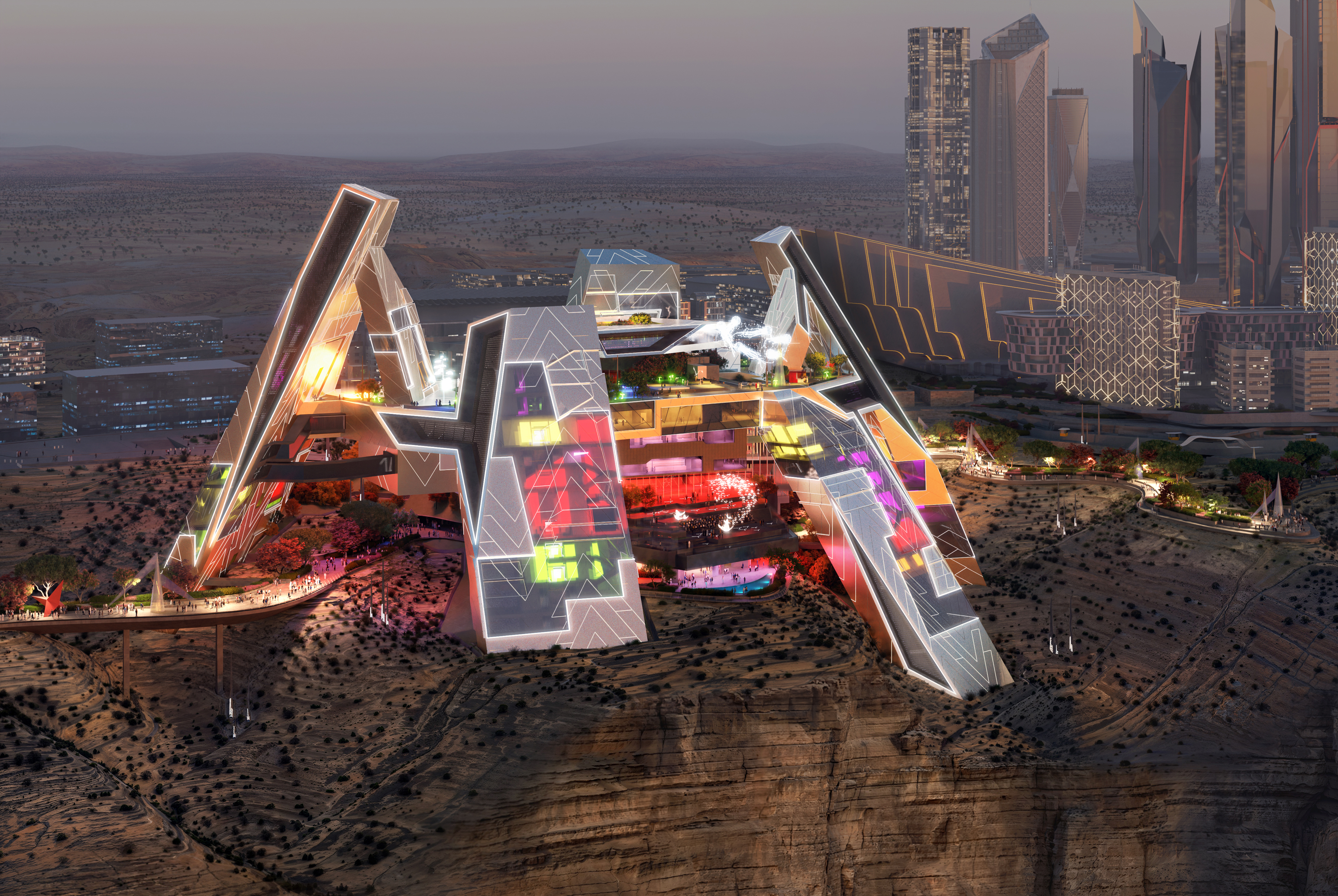
Qiddiya Performing Arts Centre (2024)

== Career ==
Wiscombe began his career as an intern at NASA's Goddard Space Flight Center, where his father served as a chief scientist. He earned a Bachelor of Arts in architecture from the University of California, Berkeley in 1992 and a Master of Architecture degree from the University of California, Los Angeles in 1999.

Between 1993 and 1998, Wiscombe worked at the Viennese architecture firm Coop Himmelb(l)au as chief design architect under design principal Wolf Prix. During this period, he contributed to the design and construction of the UFA Cinema Center in Dresden. After returning to the firm as chief designer and project partner, he led several international projects, including BMW Welt in Munich, the Musée des Confluences in Lyon, and the Akron Art Museum in Ohio.

During this time, Wiscombe received the MoMA P.S.1 Young Architects Program Award, which resulted in the construction of a crystalline canopy in the P.S.1 courtyard.

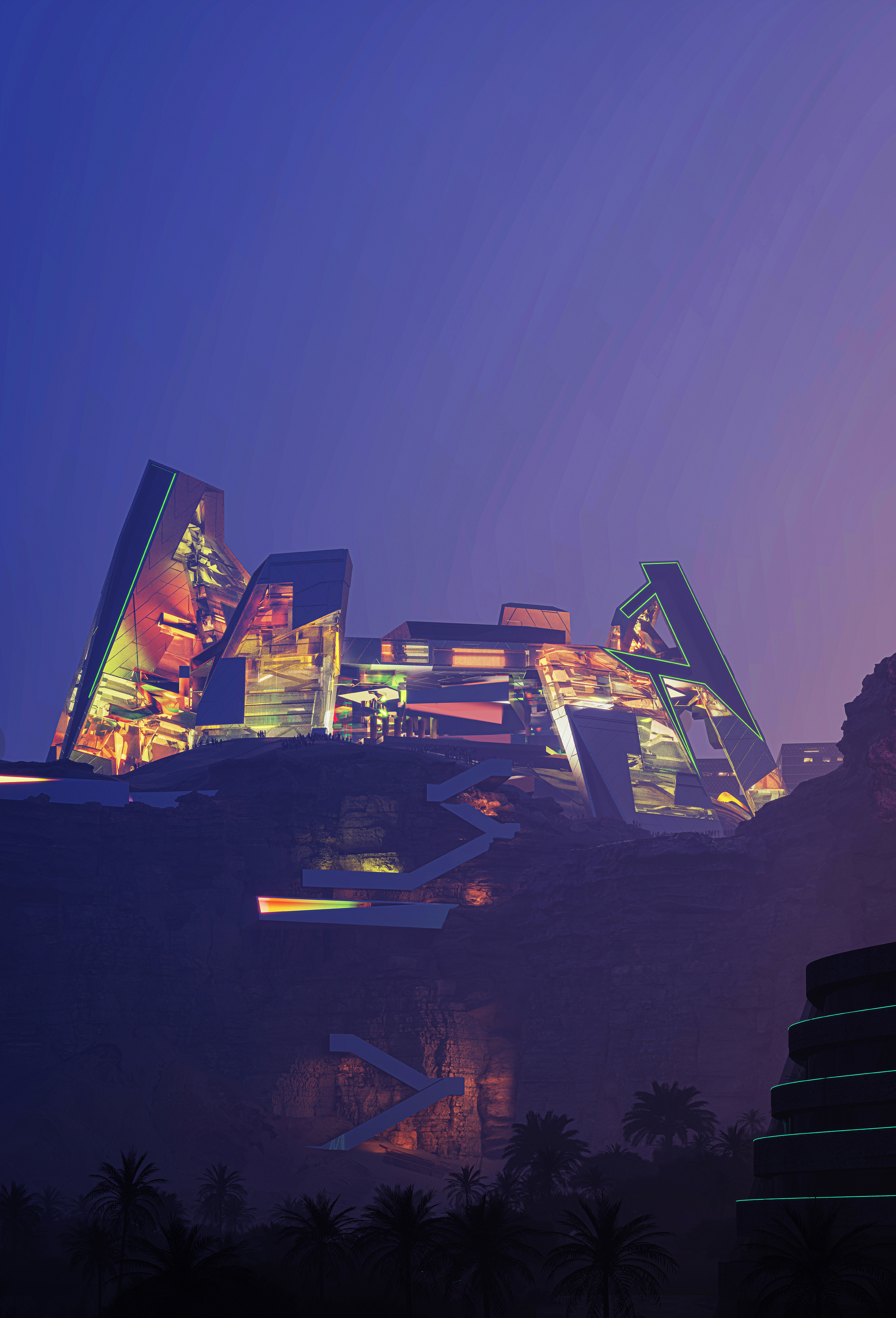
Render of Qiddiya Performing Arts Centre at night (2024)

In 2006, Wiscombe established the architectural firm Tom Wiscombe Architecture (TWA) in Los Angeles. In 2014, he won second prize in the international competition for the Kinmen Passenger Service Center in Taiwan.

That same year, planning and design began on the Main Museum of Los Angeles Art with Tom Gilmore.

Partnering with Orange Barrel Media and MOCA, Wiscombe won the West Hollywood Sunset Spectacular billboard competition in 2016. The project functions as both a contemporary bell tower and a public space and combines site specific art with interactive and commercial content.

In 2018, Wiscombe, together with EYRC Architects, designed the megaproject known as Blockchains City for Blockchains, LLC on a 67,000 acres (270 km^{2}) property in Sparks, Nevada.

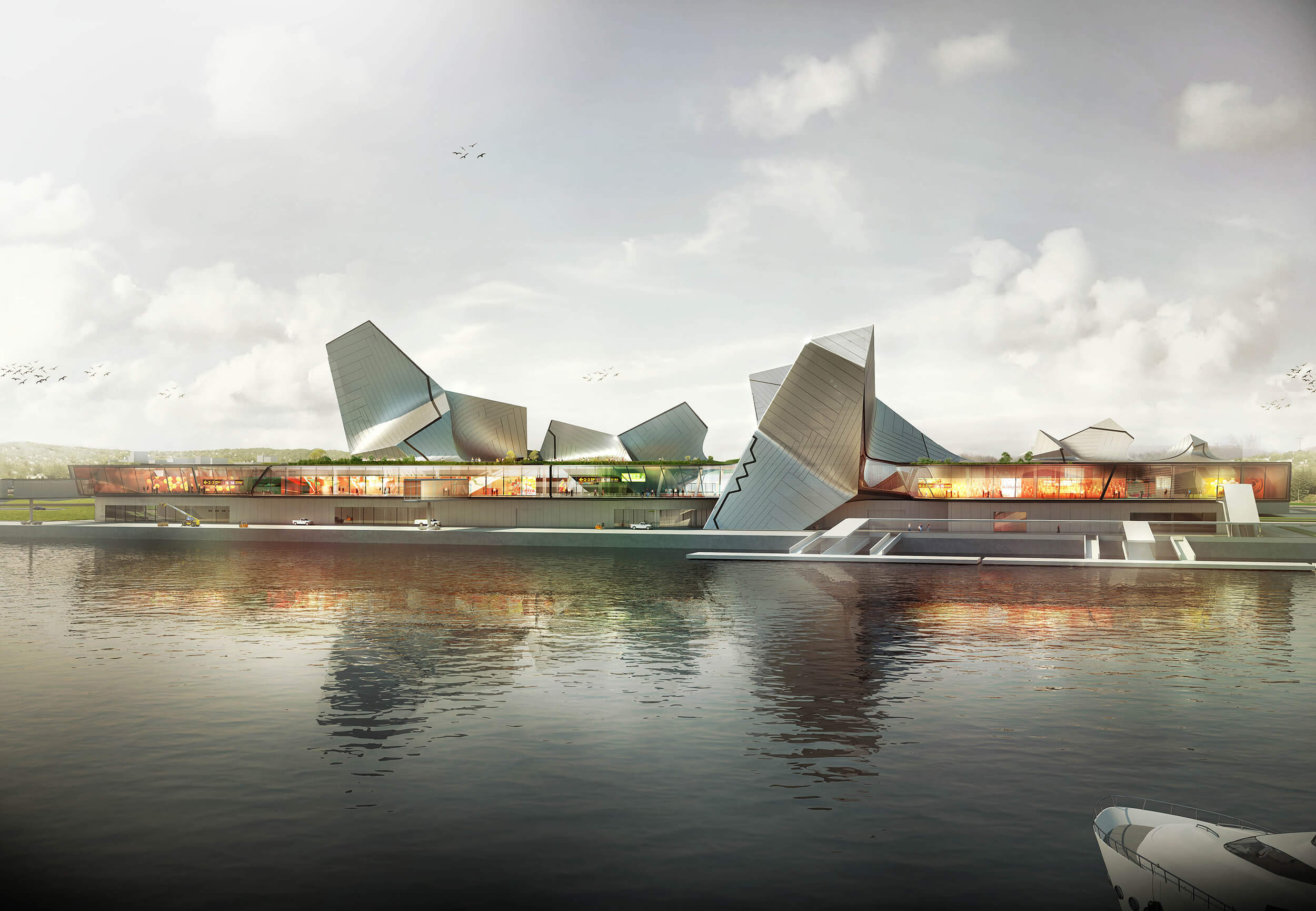
Kinmen Passenger Service Terminal, 2014

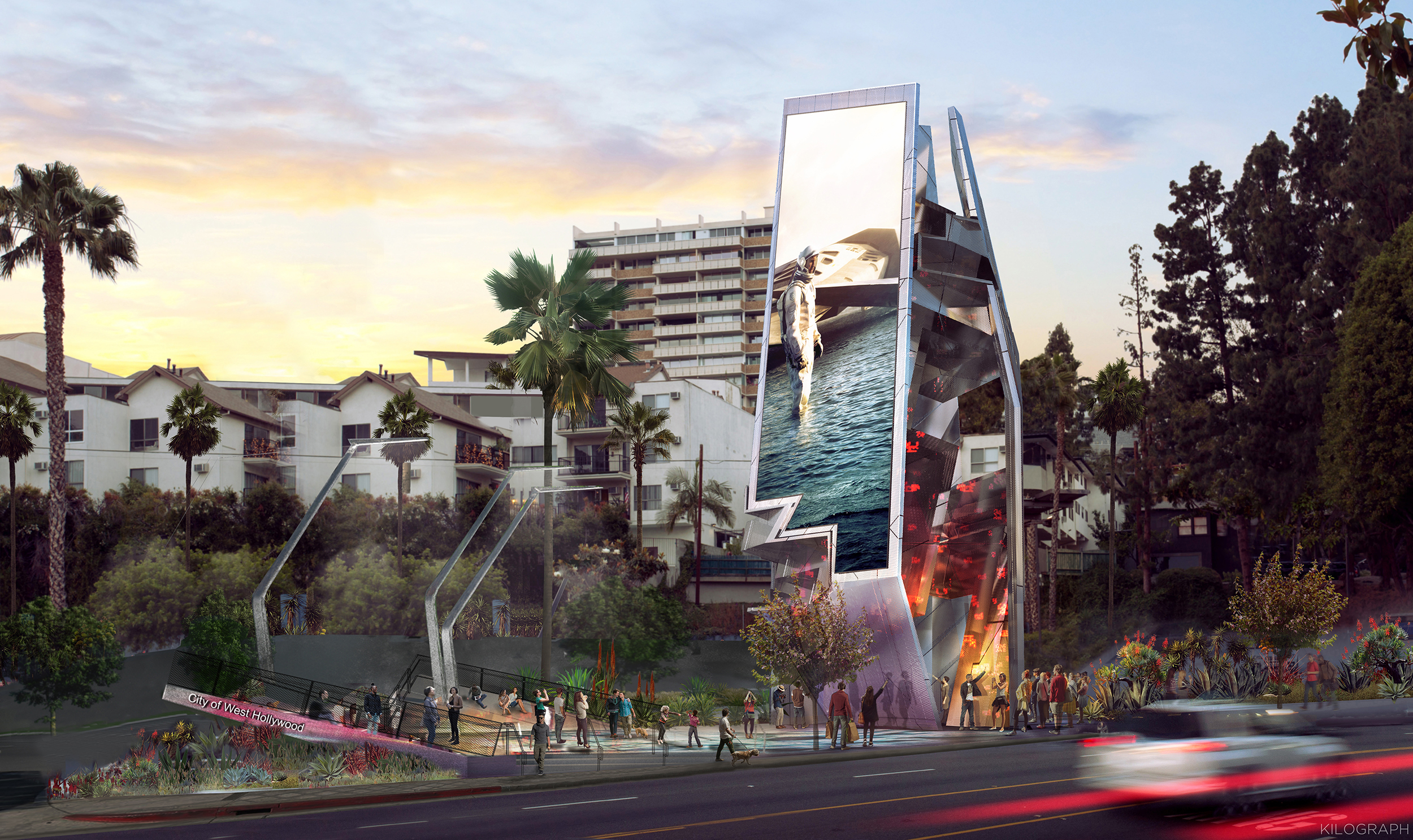
West Hollywood Sunset Spectacular, 2016 to present

In 2019, construction was completed on Wiscombe's Dark Chalet on Summit Powder Mountain. The project was reported to be 362 percent energy positive and uses residential solar technology. The project received the 2020 AIA LA NextLA Honor Award in the Single Family Residential category.

In 2021, TWA began developing The Flat Out Large, also known as Earth Protector, which addresses housing and ecological challenges in Los Angeles through a proposed urban form based on megalithic slabs, large scale indoor outdoor spaces, district scale shade, and inner city solar fields.

In 2022, Wiscombe resigned from his teaching position at the Southern California Institute of Architecture following allegations of labor exploitation and a subsequent investigation.

Wiscombe won the international competition for the Qiddiya Performing Arts Centre in 2023. The project is located on the cliffs of Qiddiya City near Riyadh, Saudi Arabia.

== Recognition ==
ICON magazine listed Wiscombe among architects noted for their influence on contemporary architectural practice in its May 2009 issue. His work is held in the permanent collections of the FRAC Centre Orleans, the Art Institute of Chicago, the SF MoMA, and the MoMA New York. Wiscombe received AIA Design Awards for the Kinmen Passenger Service Center in 2014, the Main Museum in 2015, and the Sunset Spectacular in 2017. The Qiddiya Performing Arts Centre received a Chicago Athenaeum International Architecture Award for culture and entertainment.

== Teaching ==
Wiscombe taught at the University of Pennsylvania, Yale University, and the Southern California Institute of Architecture. At SCI Arc, he served as undergraduate program chair.
