= Shelly Kappe =

American historian (1928–2025)

- Born: December 30, 1928
- Died: March 29, 2025 (aged 96)
- Education: University of California, Los Angeles; Southern California Institute of Architecture
- Occupations: Architectural historian, academic
- Known for: Founding faculty member of Southern California Institute of Architecture (SCI-Arc)
- Spouse: Ray Kappe

Shelly Kappe (December 30, 1928 – March 29, 2025) was an American architectural historian and academic known for her work on the residential architectural history of Los Angeles. She was a founding faculty member of the Southern California Institute of Architecture (SCI-Arc), an independent school of architecture established in 1972.

== Background ==
Kappe graduated from the University of California, Los Angeles and earned a master’s degree in architectural history from the Southern California Institute of Architecture.

Kappe died on March 29, 2025, at the age of 96.

== Career ==
Kappe was a prominent writer and historian focused on the modernist architects active in Los Angeles between the 1940s and 1970s. Her work appeared in Architecture California and L.A. Architect magazines. She was also the editor of Environmental Design West, writing extensively on the history of environmental design, and served on the editorial board of Architecture California in 1985.

At SCI-Arc, Kappe was instrumental in establishing and coordinating the school's Design Forum Public Lecture Program, which featured leading figures in international design and architecture.

In 1977, Kappe contributed to the exhibition "L.A. 12" at the Pacific Design Center, which brought together twelve prominent Los Angeles architects—including Frank Gehry and her husband, Ray Kappe—to exhibit their work collectively for the first time. Her contribution included videotaped interviews that accompanied the photo exhibition and an associated two-day seminar.

Kappe also served as the inaugural director of the Architecture Gallery at SCI-Arc, curating eight exhibitions. Notable shows included the 1981 inaugural exhibition Modern Architecture: Mexico—for which she authored the catalog—and The Mystery of Form, an exhibition of work by Finnish architect Alvar Aalto.
