= Kappe (Hinterland) =

Hill in Hesse, Germany

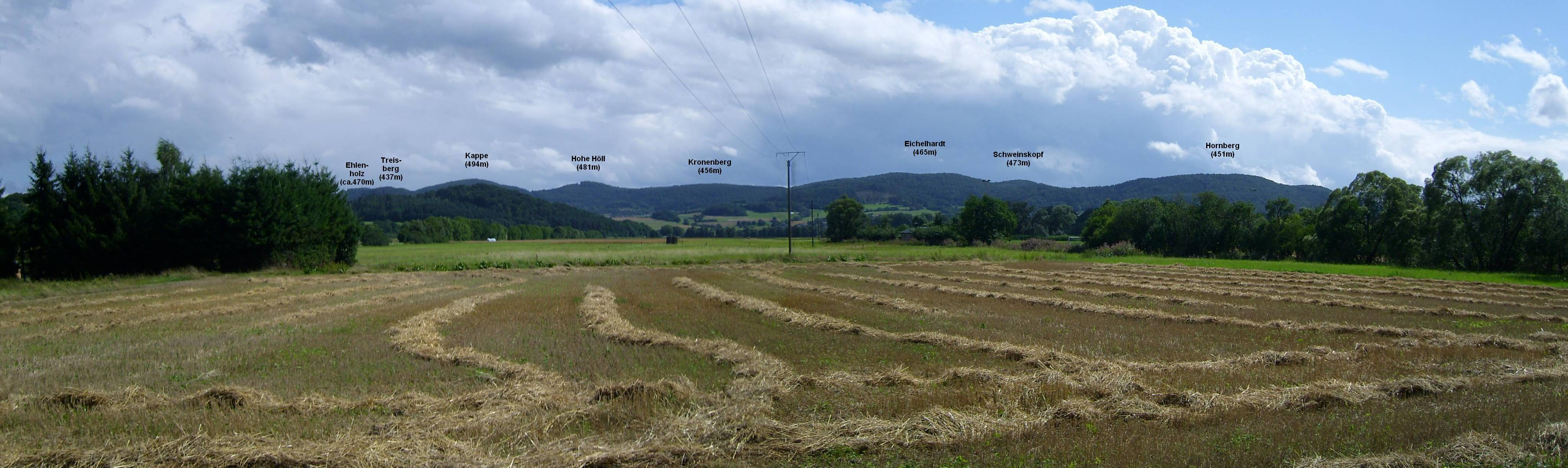
- Kappe is third from the left

Highest point
- Elevation: 493.5 m (1,619 ft)
- Listing: List of mountains of Hesse
- Coordinates: 50°50′28″N 8°36′12″E

Geography
- Location within Hesse
- Location: Hesse, Germany

Kappe is a hill in the Damshausen Hills of Hesse, Germany.
