= Southern California Institute of Architecture =

Architecture school in Los Angeles, California

- Type: Private architecture school
- Established: 1972
- Director: Winka Dubbeldam
- Students: 500
- Location: Los Angeles, California, United States; 34.045984°N 118.233431°W
- Campus: Urban
- Website: sciarc.edu

The Southern California Institute of Architecture (SCI-Arc) is a private Architecture school in Los Angeles, California, United States. Founded in 1972, SCI-Arc was initially regarded as both institutionally and artistically avant-garde. It currently enrolls approximately 600 students and employs 80 faculty members, some of whom are professional architects. The school is located in the quarter-mile long (0.40 km) former Santa Fe Freight Depot in the Arts District of downtown Los Angeles. SCI-Arc also offers community events, such as outreach programs, free exhibitions, and public lectures.

== History ==
SCI-Arc was founded in Santa Monica in 1972 by Ray Kappe, Shelly Kappe, Ahde Lahti, Thom Mayne, Bill Simonian, Glen Small, and Jim Stafford—a group of faculty from the Department of Architecture at California State Polytechnic University, Pomona. The founders were frustrated with the administrative treatment of students and faculty members at Cal Poly and wanted to address the issue from an experimental perspective, unlike most traditional schools.

Originally called "the New School," SCI-Arc was based on the concept of a "college without walls." Instead of academic hierarchies, the school initially favored a horizontal relationship between professors and students who took responsibility for their own course of study. Kappe, who had founded the Cal Poly department, became the New School's first director and served in that position until 1987. He was awarded the AIA/ACSA Topaz Medal for excellence in architecture education in 1990.

Kappe was succeeded as director by Michael Rotondi, one of SCI-Arc's original students. Neil Denari became director in 1997, Eric Owen Moss served as director from 2002–2015, and Hernán Díaz Alonso served as director and chief executive officer effective from 2015-2025. On September 1, 2025, Díaz Alonso was succeeded as director and CEO by Winka Dubbeldam.

While SCI-Arc initially established a reputation as an unaccredited, experimental school, it has since been accredited. In 2011, it paid $23.1 million for its campus building.

== Campus ==
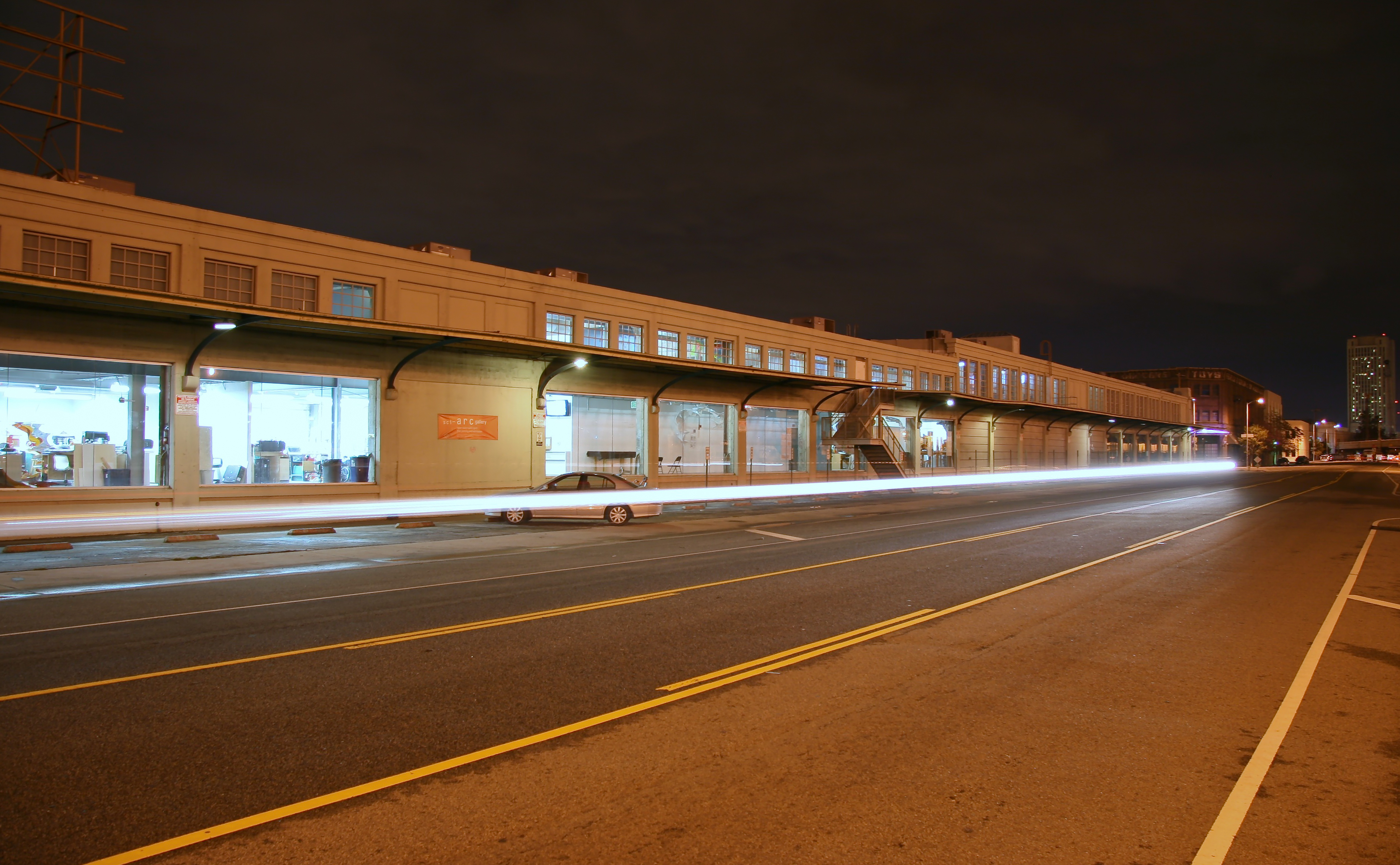
North End of SCI-Arc from Santa Fe Ave, Downtown Los Angeles

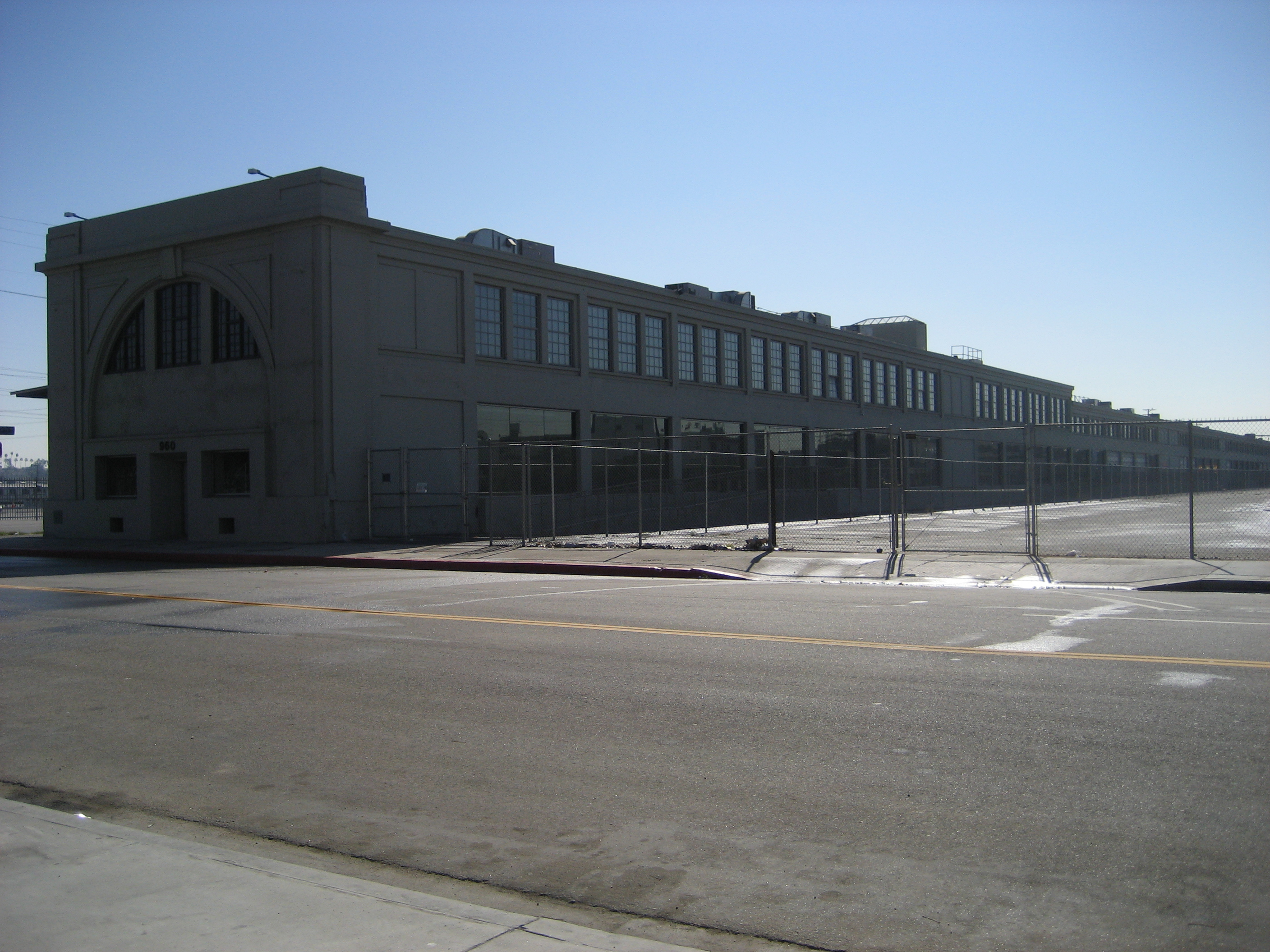
SCI-Arc Campus at the former Santa Fe Freight Depot building, view facing the institute's library.

The school has been based in three locations. The first (1972–1992) was a small industrial building in Santa Monica, and the second (1992–2000) was a larger industrial building in what would become Playa Vista, just south and east of Marina del Rey.

In 2001, it moved to its current building, the 60,000-square-foot 1907 Santa Fe Freight Depot designed by Harrison Albright on the eastern edge of Downtown Los Angeles. The building is on the National Register of Historic Places.

SCI-Arc has been awarded a $400,000 grant by ArtPlace to develop two on-campus public performance/lecture spaces, as well as development for a third public venue in the surrounding arts district. Across the street, "One Santa Fe," a 438-unit apartment complex designed by Michael Maltzan Architecture (MMA) opened in 2014.

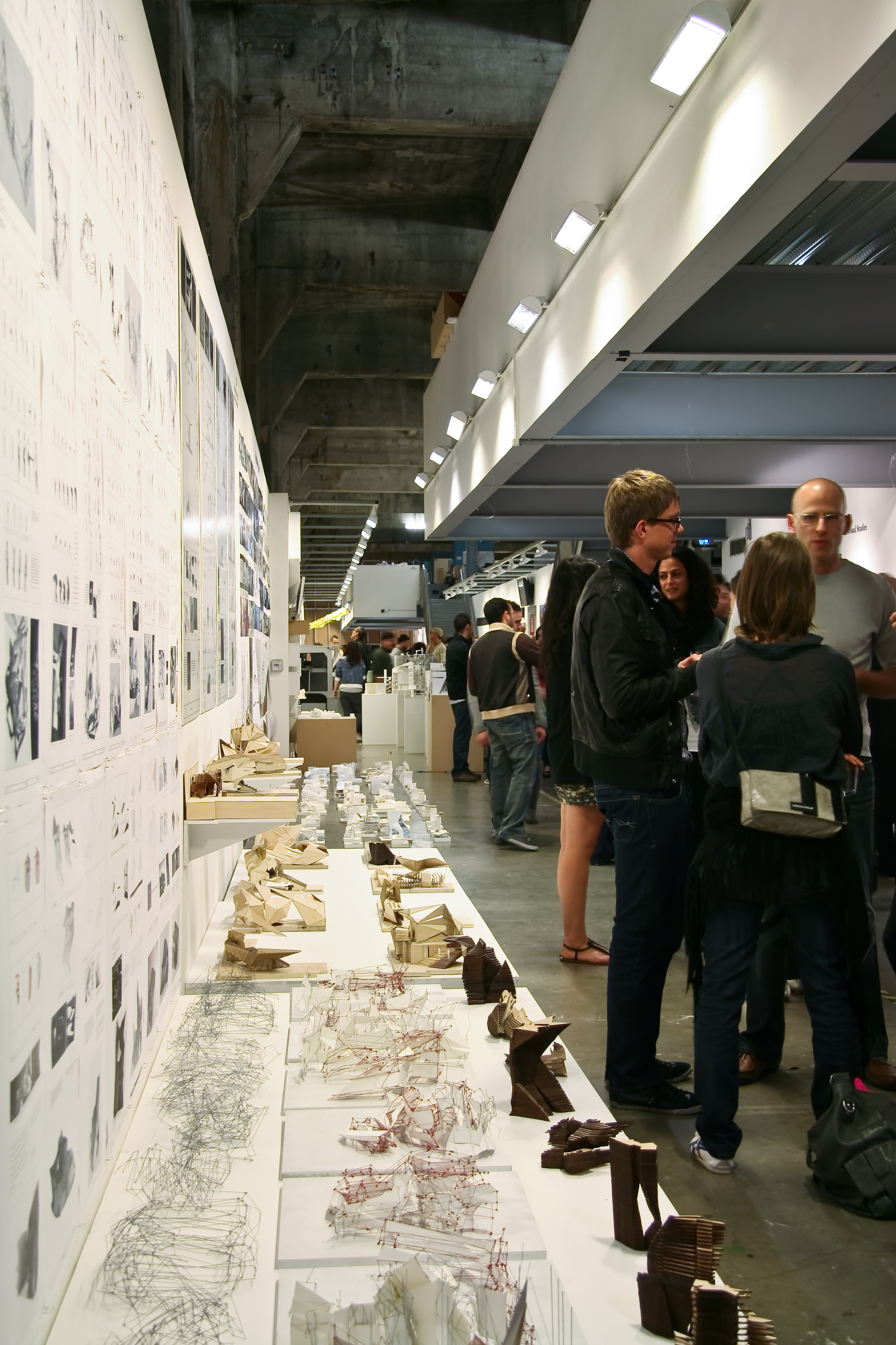
SciArc Presentation in 2011

== Academics ==
SCI-Arc offers undergraduate and graduate degree programs accredited by the National Architectural Accrediting Board and the WASC Senior College and University Commission. These include a five-year Bachelor of Architecture program. The school also offers both a three-and a two year Masters programs with separate prerequisites.

In addition to its undergraduate and graduate programs, SCI-Arc offers four one-year postgraduate programs in fields including architectural technologies, entertainment and fiction, design of cities, and theory and pedagogy.

SCI-Arc's undergraduate and graduate programs culminate in two public events in which students present their thesis projects to critics from around the world, including Peter Cook, Greg Lynn, and Pritzker Prize recipient Thom Mayne. "SCI-Arc has long been one of this country's best experimental labs in which designers speculate about the future of the human-made environment, and its thesis projects are its calling cards."

== Notable faculty ==
Notable faculty, current and former, include:

- Ann Bergren
- Walead Beshty
- Aaron Betsky
- Mike Davis
- Benjamin H. Bratton
- Manuel DeLanda
- Neil Denari
- Hernan Diaz Alonso
- Frank Gehry
- Graham Harman
- Laurie Hawkinson
- Kahlil Joseph
- Ray Kappe
- Shelly Kappe
- Elena Manferdini
- Thom Mayne
- Lucy McRae
- David Mohney
- Timothy Morton
- Eric Owen Moss
- Michael Rotondi
- Marcelo Spina
- Michael Stock
- Patrick Tighe
- Tom Wiscombe
- Liam Young
- Mimi Zeiger

== Notable alumni ==
- Barbara Bestor
- Shigeru Ban
- Moses Hacmon
- David Randall Hertz
- Sue Courtenay
- Wanda Dalla Costa
- Jon Drezner
- Jeffrey Eyster
- Gordon Kipping
- Ola-dele Kuku
- Cara Lee
- Karen M'Closkey
- David Montalba
- Abinadi Meza
- Rocio Romero
- Mimi Zeiger
- Daniel Inocente
