= Ray Kappe =

American architect and educator (1927–2019)

- Born: August 4, 1927; Minneapolis, Minnesota
- Died: November 21, 2019 (aged 92)
- Occupation: Architect
- Awards: Richard Neutra International Medal for Design Excellence, the California Council/AIA Bernard Maybeck Award for Design Excellence, the Topaz Medal
- Practice: Kappe Architects Planners
- Buildings: Benton House
- Projects: Southern California Institute of Architecture

Ray Kappe (August 4, 1927 – November 21, 2019) was an American architect and educator. In 1972, he resigned his position as Founding Chair of the Department of Architecture at California State Polytechnic University, Pomona and along with a group of faculty, students and his wife, Shelly Kappe, started what eventually came to be known as the Southern California Institute of Architecture (SCI-Arc). In 2003, Kappe began working with LivingHomes to design modular homes.

Kappe remained actively involved in architectural theory and practice in his later years, particularly in the areas of sustainability and the prefabrication of residences.

== Early life and education ==
Kappe was born in Minneapolis on August 4, 1927, the son of Romanian immigrants. He attended high school in Los Angeles. He studied for a single semester at UCLA in 1945 before being drafted in into the U.S. Army Corps of Engineers, where he served as a topographical surveying instructor.

== Career ==
After his discharge Kappe attended the University of California, Berkeley, and earned a B.Arch. degree in 1951. He practiced architecture on his own starting in 1954, and then became one of the principals of Kahn Kappe Lotery Boccato in 1968. The firm changed names in 1978 to Kappe Lotery Boccato and in 1985, Kappe split off to form Kappe Architects Planners.

Along with Thom Mayne and Shelly Kappe, he founded Southern California Institute of Architecture (SCI-Arc for short). This institute promoted a more well-rounded, avant-garde, and progressive approach to architecture, something Kappe always advocated for.

Kappe designed multiple houses in California and elsewhere, he put emphasis on making homes functional in their climate and site through use of technology and local materials.

Kappe died from respiratory failure on November 21, 2019.

== Legacy ==
The Ray Kappe Archive is housed at the Getty Research Institute and contains all of his drawings, models, and papers, offering comprehensive coverage of his long and varied career.

In 2021, actor Will Arnett sold a custom residence based on a design by Kappe in Beverly Hills for $7.85 million.

Southern California Institute of Architecture is still open and accepting students. The school is structured differently than many other institutions for architecture. Kappe had the goal of promoting a general education, offering writing classes, mechanics classes, and all sorts of education that wasn't directly related to architecture. His mission was to create well-rounded students.

== In popular culture ==
The Showtime series Californication features one of Kappe's projects, the Benton House, as a major plot point in Episode Seven, "Girls Interrupted." The interior of this house is also featured on the CBS series Shark and in the movie Cruel Intentions.

Another of his projects made two brief appearances in the Sea Hunt episode, "Hit and Run," as the residence of the episode's villain. This house was also featured in the Home section of the Los Angeles Times, in an article titled, "A Boat, a Bay, and a Happy House."

'People Movers', taken from the unused plans for a 1970s Los Angeles redevelopment project, was used by Manchester band Shaking Hand as the cover artwork for their self-titled debut album, released on 16th January 2026 via Melodic.
