= Morphosis Architects =

American architectural firm

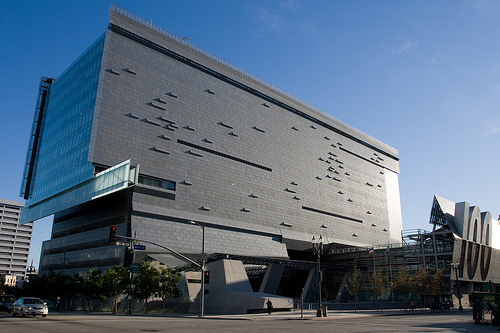

Practice information
- Partners: Arne Emerson; Ung-Joo Scott Lee; Thom Mayne; Brandon Welling; Eui-Sung Yi; Xiangyu Ray Chen
- Founders: Michael Brickler; Thom Mayne; Livio Santini; James Stafford
- Founded: 1972; 54 years ago
- No. of employees: >60
- Location: Los Angeles, California; New York City

Significant works and honors
- Buildings: 41 Cooper Square; Caltrans District 7 Headquarters; Casablanca Finance City Tower; Hanking Center; Orange County Museum of Art; Perot Museum of Nature and Science; San Francisco Federal Building; Wayne Lyman Morse United States Courthouse

Website
- www.morphosis.com

Morphosis Architects is an interdisciplinary architectural and design practice based in Los Angeles and New York City.

== History ==
The firm was informally founded in 1972 by Michael Brickler, Thom Mayne, Livio Santini and James Stafford. Michael Rotondi joined the practice in 1975 and remained a principal until 1991. Writing in 1989, Boston Globe architecture critic Robert Campbell called Morphosis "one of the country's most interesting" architecture firms, and described its very physical, materials-focused design style as "look[ing] as if it might hurt you."

== Principals ==
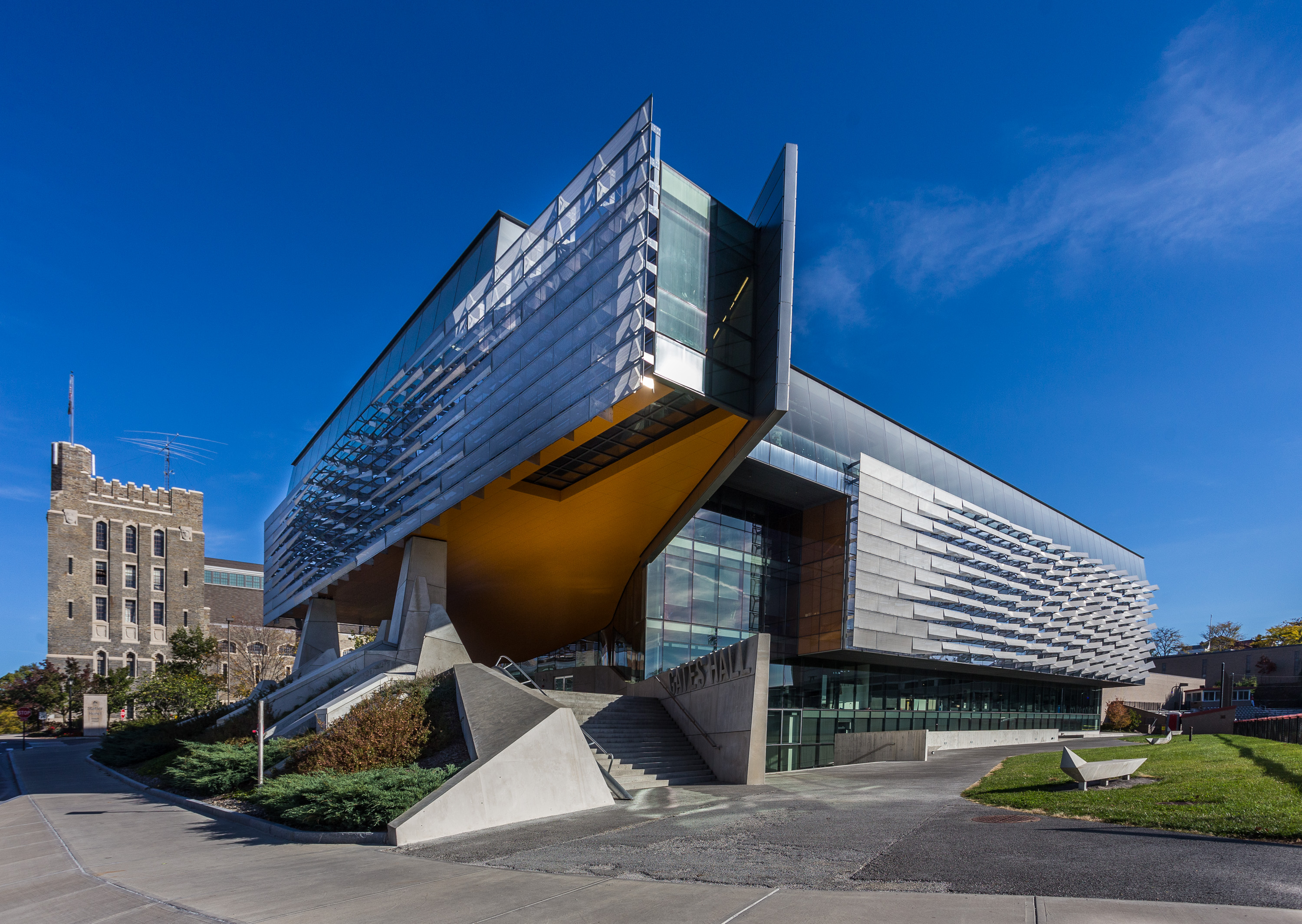
Bill & Melinda Gates Hall at Cornell University (2014)

Born in Connecticut, Thom Mayne (b. 1944) studied architecture at the University of Southern California and Harvard Graduate School of Design. He was a founding member of the Southern California Institute of Architecture (SCI-Arc) in 1972, and has held faculty positions at the Southern California Institute of Architecture, California Polytechnic State University, Pomona, and the University of California, Los Angeles. Mayne was the recipient of the Pritzker Architecture Prize in 2005.

Michael Rotondi (b. 1949) was one of 50 students who attended SCI-Arc when it started in 1972. He became the director of the school in 1987, and held that position until 1997. Rotondi's career awards include the 2009 AIA/LA Gold Medal and the 2014 Richard J. Neutra Medal from Cal Poly Pomona College of Environmental Design.

== Projects ==
Notable works by the firm include:

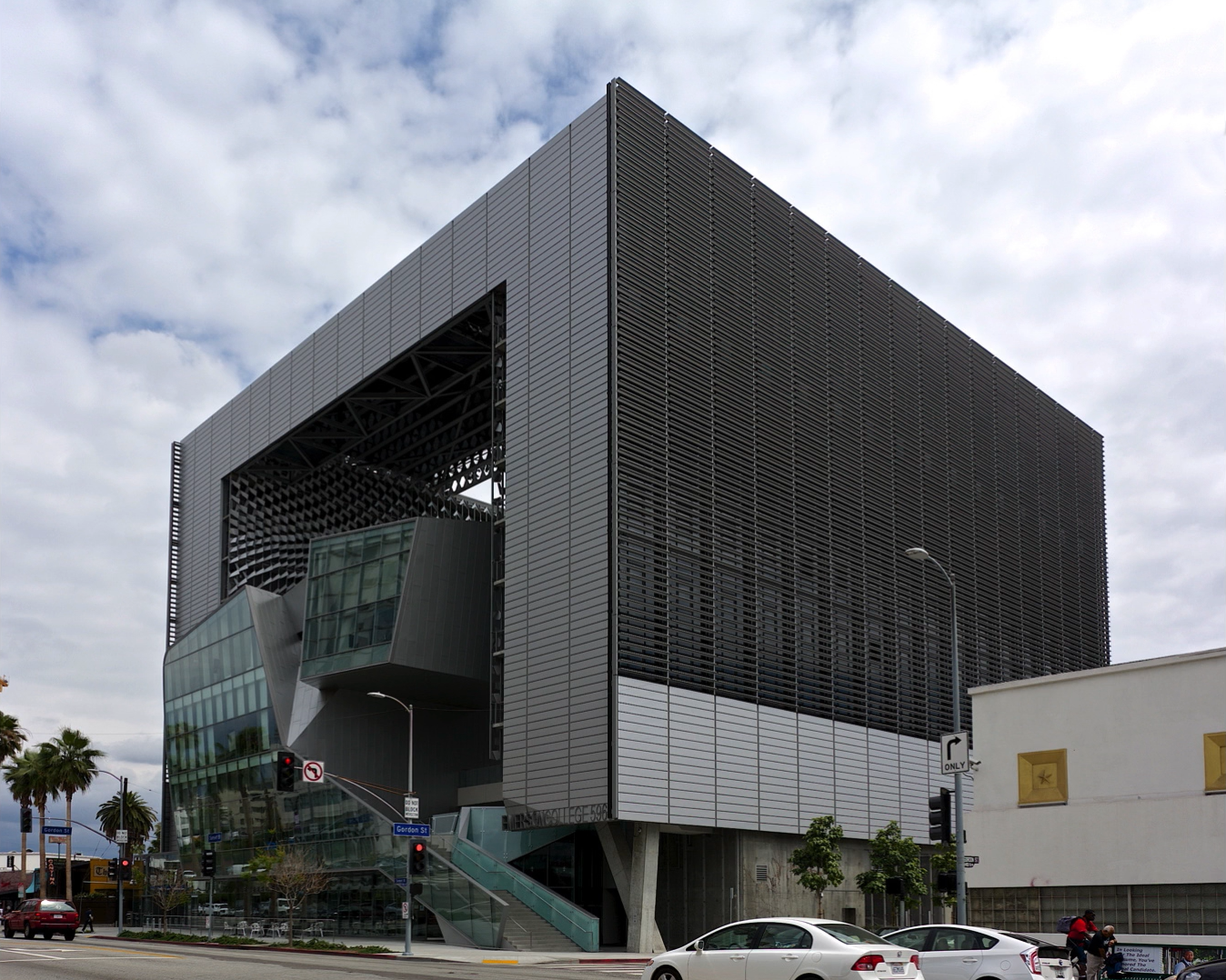
Emerson College LA Center (2014)

- 1981–1984: The Lawrence Residence, Hermosa Beach, California; described as "two stylistically different structures that collide at a slight angle on their narrow lot...".
- 1997: Diamond Ranch High School, Pomona, California
- 2000: University of Toronto Graduate House, Toronto, Canada
- 2004: Caltrans District 7 Headquarters, Los Angeles, California
- 2009: 41 Cooper Square, New York City, New York; housing the Cooper Union Albert Nerken School of Engineering
- 2007: San Francisco Federal Building, San Francisco, California; the first federal building to achieve LEED certification
- 2012: Perot Museum of Nature and Science, Dallas, Texas
- 2014: Bill & Melinda Gates Hall, Ithaca, New York; housing Cornell's Computing and Information Science (CIS) program
- 2014: Emerson College, Los Angeles, California
- 2017: Bloomberg Center, New York City, New York; a $115 million, five-story, "net-zero energy" building on the Cornell Tech campus which uses the power it creates on its own
- 2018: Hanking Center, Shenzhen, China
- 2019: Casablanca Finance City Tower, Casablanca, Morocco
- 2022: Orange County Museum of Art, Costa Mesa, California
- 2020-: Korean American National Museum, Los Angeles, California

== Awards ==
Mayne and Rotondi received numerous awards for their work in Morphosis, including 11 American Institute of Architects awards and 12 from Progressive Architecture. In 1992, the American Academy and Institute of Arts and Letters awarded them the Academy-Institute Award in Architecture.

Morphosis has been recognized with more than 190 local, national and international awards, including nine for the design of the Emerson College Los Angeles campus and 16 for the Perot Museum of Nature and Science. These include the 2014 Los Angeles Architecture Awards Grand Prize, presented by the Los Angeles Business Council, for designing the campus of Emerson College in Hollywood.
