= 41 Cooper Square =

School building in Manhattan, New York

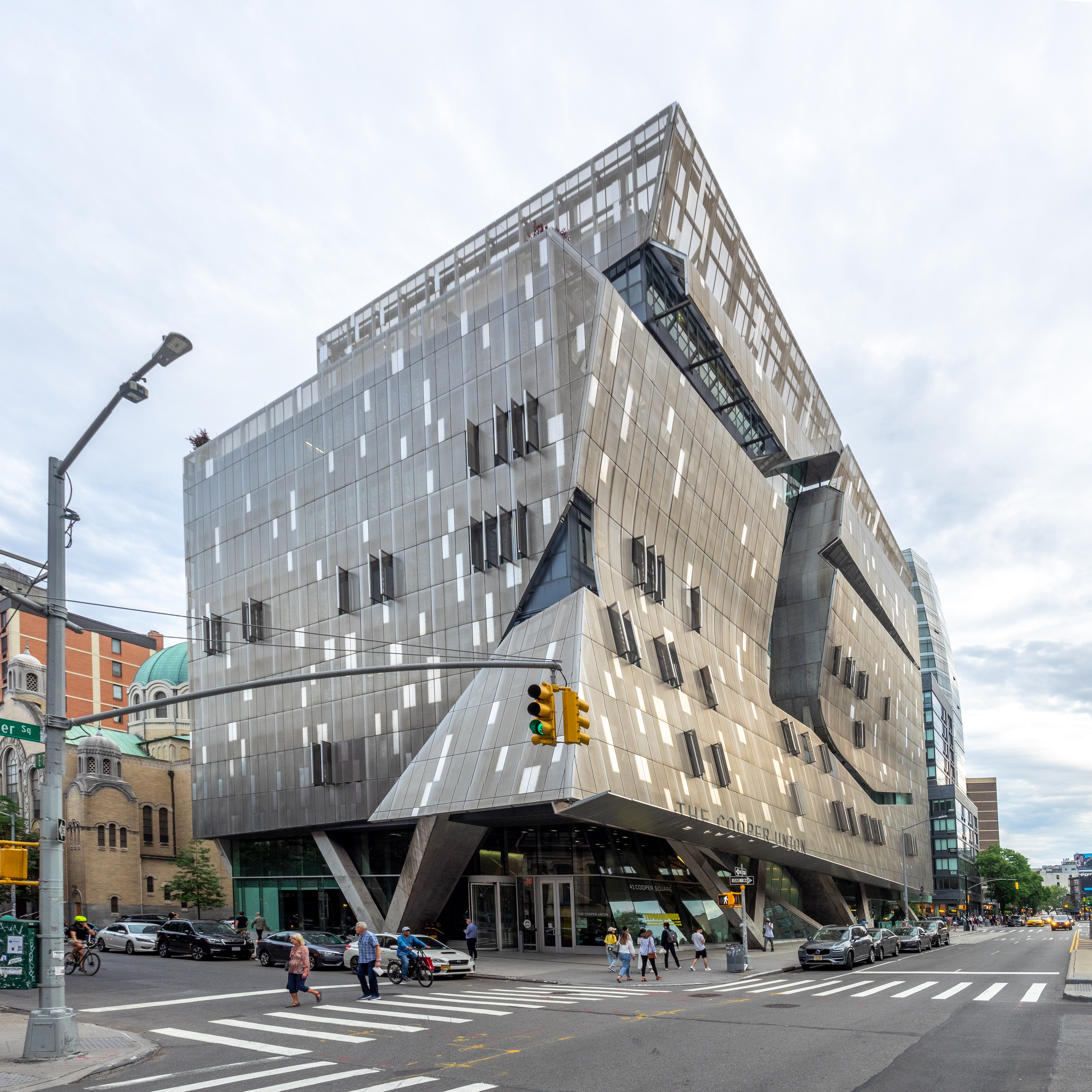
- Cooper Union's 41 Cooper Square, seen from Cooper Triangle Park
- Interactive map of the 41 Cooper Square area
- Former names: New Academic Building

General information
- Status: Open
- Type: School
- Location: Cooper Square, 41 Cooper Square, New York, NY 10003, United States
- Coordinates: 40°43′43″N 73°59′25″W
- Current tenants: Cooper Union
- Groundbreaking: 2006
- Construction started: 2006
- Completed: 2009
- Opened: September 2009
- Owner: Cooper Union
- Landlord: Cooper Union

Technical details
- Floor count: 9
- Floor area: 175,000 square feet (16,300 m^{2})

Design and construction
- Architect: Thom Mayne
- Architecture firm: Morphosis + Gruzen Samton-IBI Group
- Structural engineer: John A. Martin & Associates
- Services engineer: Syska Hennessy
- Designations: LEED Platinum

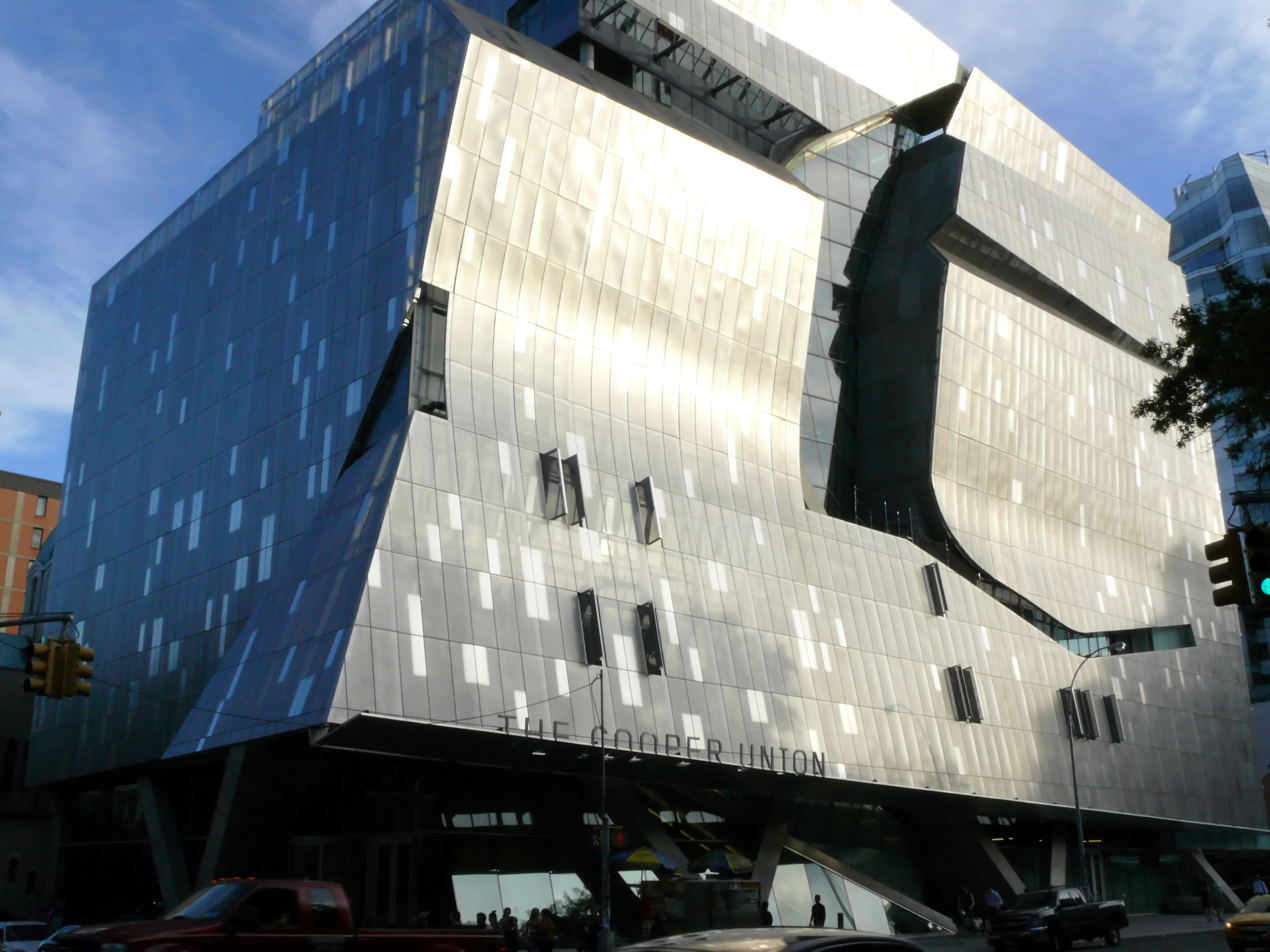
Other view of exterior

41 Cooper Square is a nine-story, 175,000-square-foot (16,300 m^{2}) academic center at Cooper Square, Manhattan, New York City, that houses Cooper Union's Albert Nerken School of Engineering with additional spaces for the humanities, art, and architecture departments. Designed by architect Thom Mayne of Morphosis, there is also an exhibition gallery and auditorium for public programs and retail space on the ground level. The building, originally known as the New Academic Building, stands on the site where Cooper Union's School of Art's former home, the Abram Hewitt Building, was located; the site of the former School of Engineering building was leased to a developer following the move to the new building. Construction of the building began in 2006 and was completed in September 2009. The project has been controversial in the East Village neighborhood where 41 Cooper Square is located.

== History ==
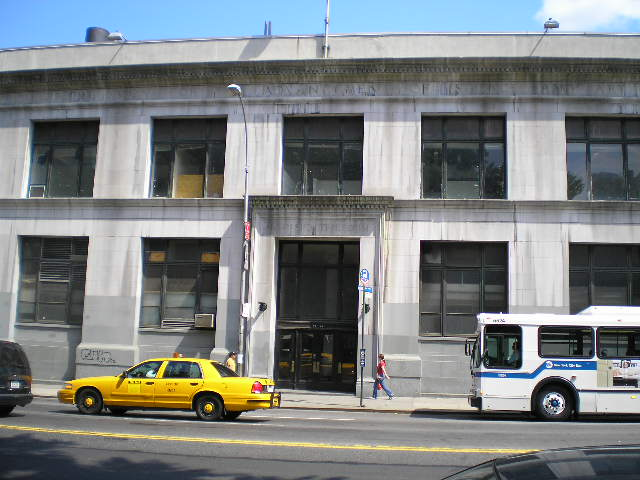

The Cooper Union's "New Academic Building" at 41 Cooper Square was built on the former site of the two-story Hewitt Building, a city-owned property constructed in 1912 that housed the School of Art for the institution. Its demolition for the construction of the Academic Building was part of a broader plan to expand the university's "campus" and redevelop the neighboring area. The plan was put forth at the beginning of 2001 and proved to be very controversial. It originally called for a nine-story academic building to replace the Hewitt Building, a fifteen-story office complex to replace the engineering building, the removal of Taras Shevchenko Place (a tiny street honoring a Ukrainian folk hero between Saint George Ukrainian Catholic Church and the site), and the development of a parking lot on 26 Astor Place and an empty lot on Stuyvesant Street into a hotel or for another commercial tenant. Cooper Union needed approval from the City Planning Commission for the construction of larger than normal buildings and the transfer of zoning allowances between sites before the plan could be realized.

Local residents and community groups opposed the plan and proceeded with a lawsuit in hopes that the college's application would be rejected. They felt the proposal would turn the low-rise artistic character of the East Village into a typical midtown high-rise business district. In response to community concerns, Cooper Union altered plans and building designs. The bulk of the two new buildings were reduced, Taras Shevchenko Place was to remain and the development of the lot on Stuyvesant Street was no longer pursued.

George Campbell Jr., then-president of the college, claimed that planned expansion was essential for its survival. Not only was the new space and resources needed by faculty and students, but the school needed new sources of revenue. As of 2002, the college had seen a $9 million deficit each year since 1982. Its revenue consisted of rent collected on the land below the Chrysler Building, which it owns, alumni donations, and an investment portfolio. Because Cooper Union provided full scholarships for all its students at the time, raising tuition in times of need was not an option. The school's primary assets are in real estate and that is what the plan capitalized on. Leasing out the parking lot and the office and commercial spaces in the new buildings would bring in much needed income for the school.

On September 3, 2002, the expansion plan was approved by the City Planning Commission. The necessary zoning changes were permitted, allowing the school to maximize the amount of office space in the new tower and have commercial space on land that was restricted to educational and philanthropic uses. The city planners felt the public good that Cooper Union provided outweighed the impact on the community.

Construction took place from 2006 to 2009, during which Morphosis set up a temporary office in the lobby of the Foundation building.

On January 31 and February 2, 2019, the building suffered multiple burst pipes during cold weather. On the latter of these days, the building flooded with over 12,000 gallons of water in 35 minutes, which resulted in most engineering classes having to be cancelled for the following week. Architecture and some art classes were able to proceed in the unaffected Foundation Building across the street, along with some humanities classes in space provided by St. John's University.

== Architecture ==
=== Context and site ===
The Cooper Union campus is located in the East Village neighborhood of New York City on Third Avenue between East 6th and 9th streets. Prior to Cooper Union's expansion plan, the campus consisted of three academic buildings, one for each of the disciplines of art, architecture, and engineering, and a seventeen-story dormitory. After redevelopment, the campus consists of just two academic buildings, with the New Academic Building on the former site of the art building just across the street of the foundation building, which now houses both the schools of art and architecture.

The area around the site consists mostly of low to mid-rise buildings with small commercial businesses on ground level and residential spaces above. Mixed into the scene are various buildings belonging to New York University. The neighborhood was once the scene of early twentieth-century tenements and warehouses and a heady experimental art and cultural scene in the 1960s and 1970s. Recent projects, most of which are part of the Cooper Union expansion plan, have started to change the modest physical profile. The other piece of modern architecture introduced into this neighborhood (prior to the New Academic Building) is the Sculpture for Living building, a high-rise luxury condo tower, designed by Gwathmey Siegel & Associates Architects on 26 Astor Place. The site is serviced by two subway lines and many bus routes, which make it a desirable location for developers.

The New Academic Building, located on Third Avenue between East 6th and 7th streets, sits diagonally across the Foundation Building facing Peter Cooper Park. Mayne situated the lobby entrance of the building at the corner of the block to face the entrance of the Foundation Building. The two buildings are similar in scale since both are built out to their limits and encompass the entire block. Also, the ground levels are visibly accessible to the public. Retail space lines the Third Avenue frontage of the New Academic Building similar to the original arcades of the Foundation Building. As a gesture towards St. George's Ukrainian Church which is situated behind the building, Mayne frames the reflection of the dome on the eastern façade of the building.

=== Form and use ===
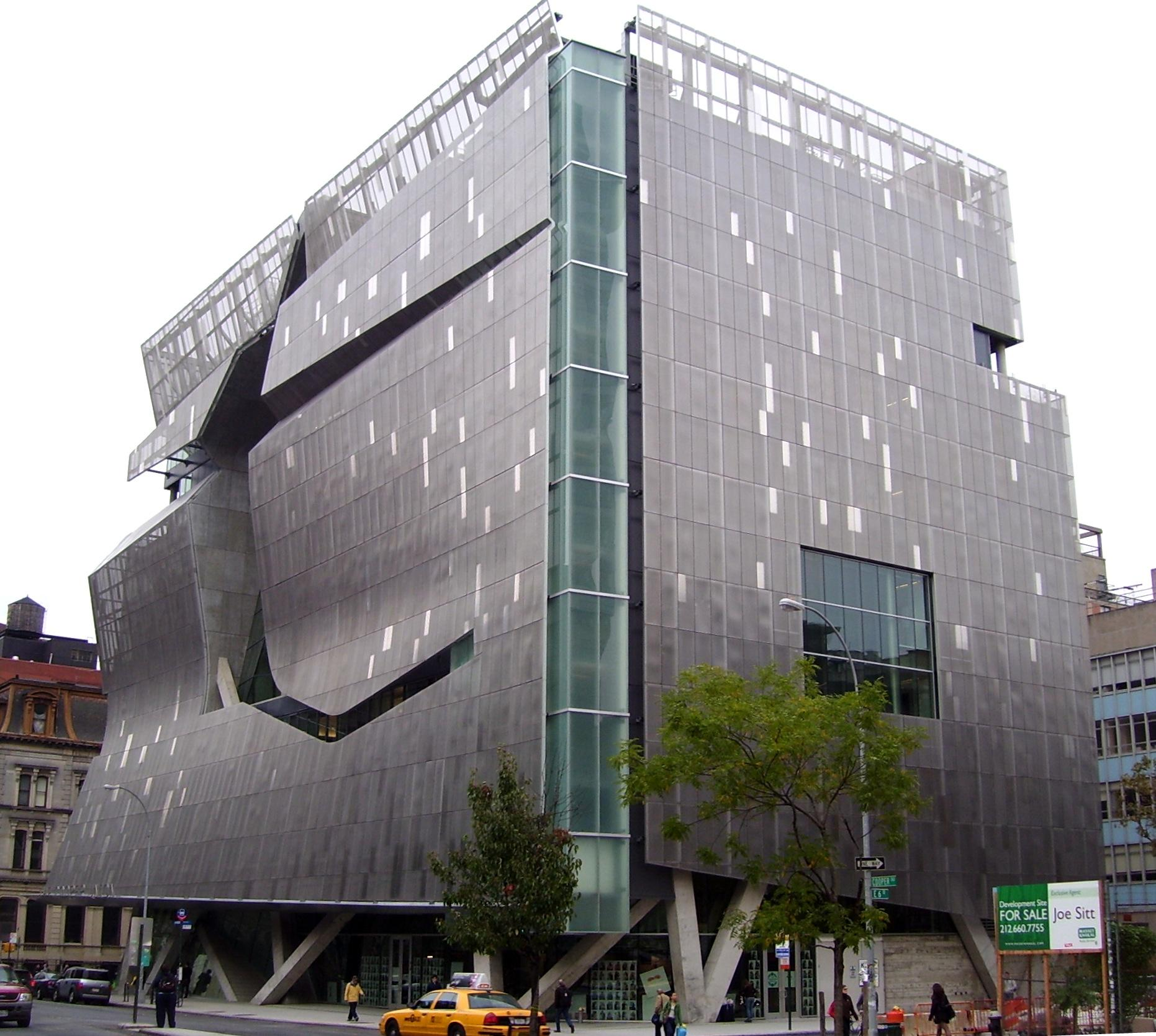
The building from the south

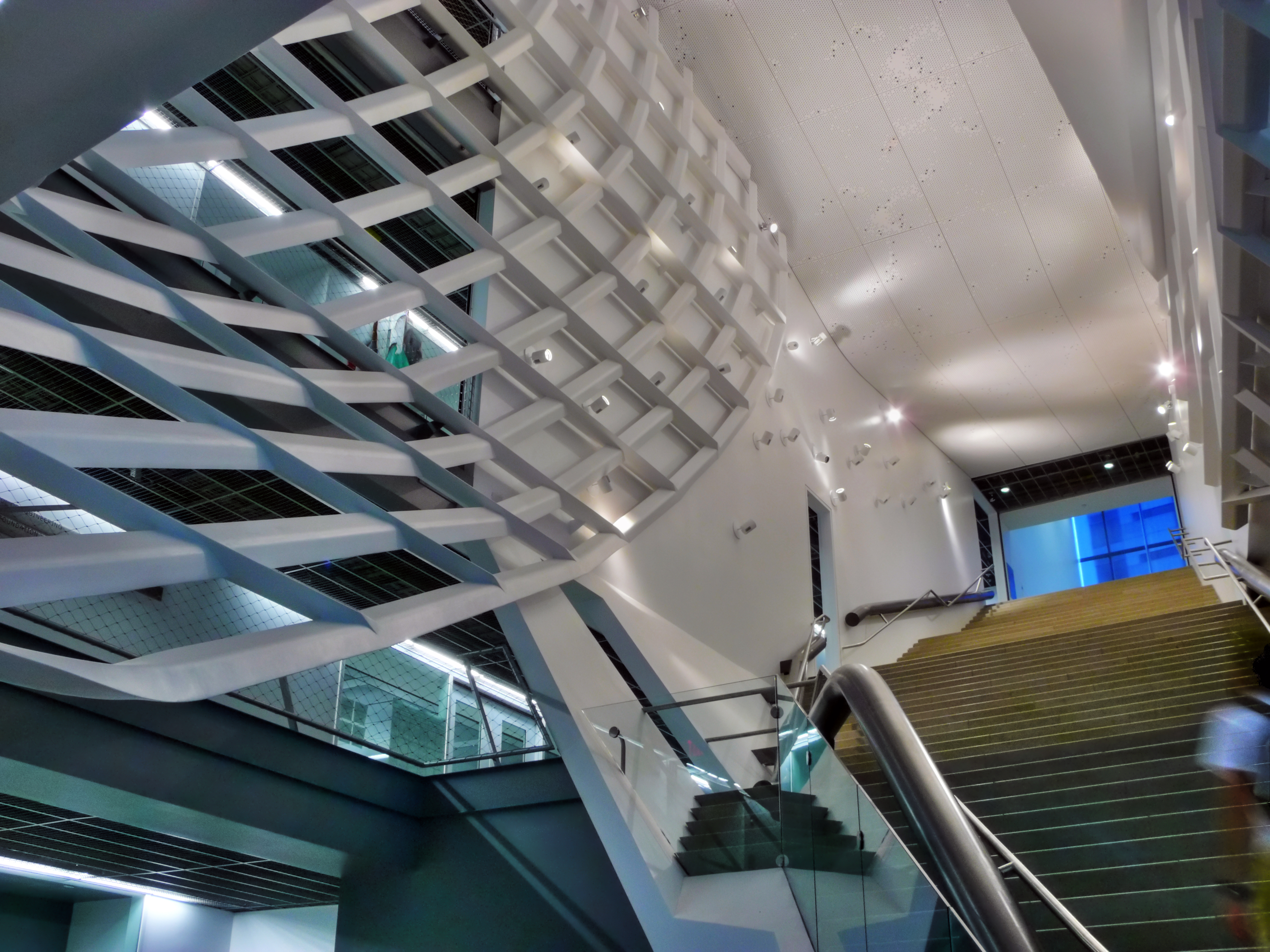
Main Atrium and Grand Staircase of 41 Cooper Square

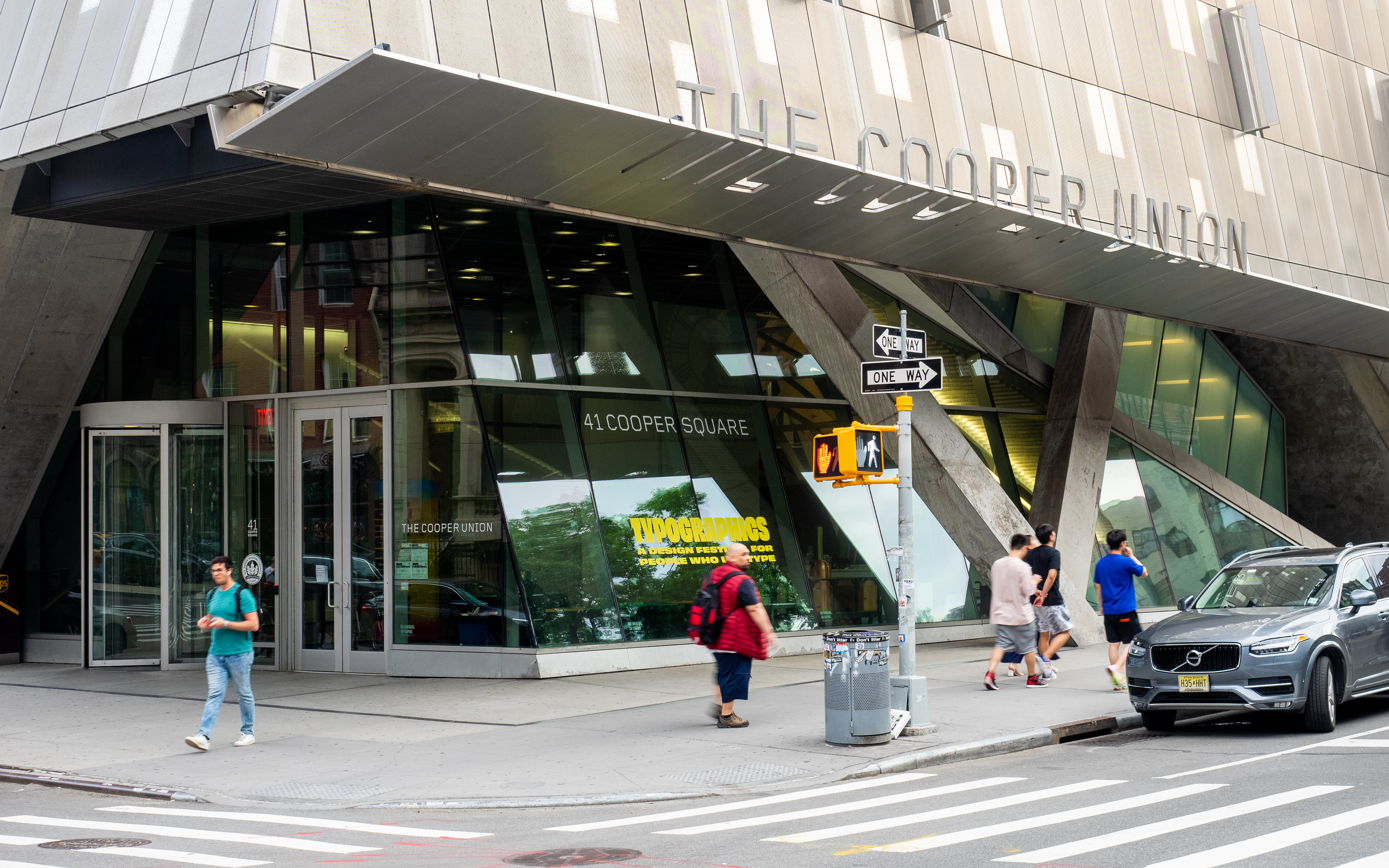
Entrance to 41 Cooper Square

Both Mayne and Cooper Union wanted to create an iconic building that embodied the institution's values and aspirations as a center for advanced education in art, architecture and engineering. It was to be a vehicle for cross-disciplinary dialogue among the three disciplines, which had previously been housed in separate buildings.

Mayne designed the building from the inside out, starting with a central atrium, referred to as a vertical piazza. The atrium plays the role of the public square in the building where social interaction can occur. Its form was created by carving out program space and circulation paths and is contained and accentuated in a steel lattice envelope that reaches the full height of the building. Classrooms, offices, studios, and laboratories surround the vertical atrium and are connected by three separate staircases. The grand staircase, which welcomes students and visitors, starts from the ground floor and terminates at the fourth. Two secondary staircases cross the atrium like bridges and connect the fourth to sixth and seventh to ninth floors. To move from the sixth to seventh floor, one must use the fire stairs. The discontinuity of the staircases was intended to promote physical activity and to increase meeting opportunities. The main elevators are treated in a similar fashion where stops are limited to the first, fifth and eight floors, encouraging occupants to use the sky bridges and stairs. Mayne concentrated the program of student activities on the same floors that are serviced by the skip stop elevator.

The entire atrium is made evident on the façade where a large cutaway reveals the piazza to the public. Student circulation is made visible and from inside, Peter Cooper Park and the Foundation Building become the focus. The exterior façade is made up of a stainless steel curtain wall that wraps the entire building and was used by Morphosis earlier in their design of Caltrans District 7 Headquarters. This custom facade by Zahner is densely perforated except in certain rectangular areas, so that the visual effect is a series of rectangles shapes scattered across the surface of the facade. It is made up of operable panels that can open and close depending on environmental conditions. At the building entrance, the metal curtain is slightly lifted to draw people into the lobby.

The ground floor is kept transparent to maintain a visual connection between the public and the public programs of the building. Retail spaces and an exhibition gallery can be seen from street level. There is also a board room and two-hundred-seat auditorium on the lower level that houses public events.

The building's eighth-floor green roof houses a three-ton marble eagle sculpture, formerly at Cooper Union's Albert Nerken School of Engineering at 51 Astor Place, and originally part of the 1910 Pennsylvania Station.

=== Materials and construction methods ===
The New Academic Building achieved a LEED Platinum rating, the first for an institutional building in New York City. It employs standard methods of construction where a reinforced concrete framing is cast on site and enclosed in an aluminum and glass curtain wall. The operable perforated stainless steel skin is offset from the glass but still attached to the main frame. Innovative technologies are introduced into the building system to maximize energy efficiency. Radiant heating and cooling ceiling panels provide a more efficient means of achieving thermal comfort, a green roof helps insulate the building and collects storm water, and a cogeneration plant provides additional power but recovers waste heat. The full-height atrium provides interior day lighting to the building core and the semi-transparent nature of the façade has allowed for seventy-five percent of the occupied spaces to be naturally lit. The total cost of the building was $166 million or $950 per sq ft.

=== Architectural significance ===
41 Cooper Square incorporates sustainable technologies into the function and architecture of the building. Nicolai Ouroussoff, architectural critic of The New York Times, praised the building as being an "example of how to create powerful architecture that is not afraid to engage its urban surroundings" and "a bold architectural statement of genuine civic value."

== In popular culture ==
The building appears in the 2013 U.S. television series The Tomorrow People as the headquarters of the Ultra agency. It also appears in the third season of the television series Person of Interest as the headquarters for the fictitious company Lifetrace and in the first season of the television series Limitless as the headquarters for the fictitious company Claxion. It also saw use as a background for scenes from the fourth season of the TV series "Glee". It was the home of NYPD's 11th Precinct in the 2018-2019 TV series Instinct.
