= Wayne Lyman Morse United States Courthouse =

Building in Oregon, United States

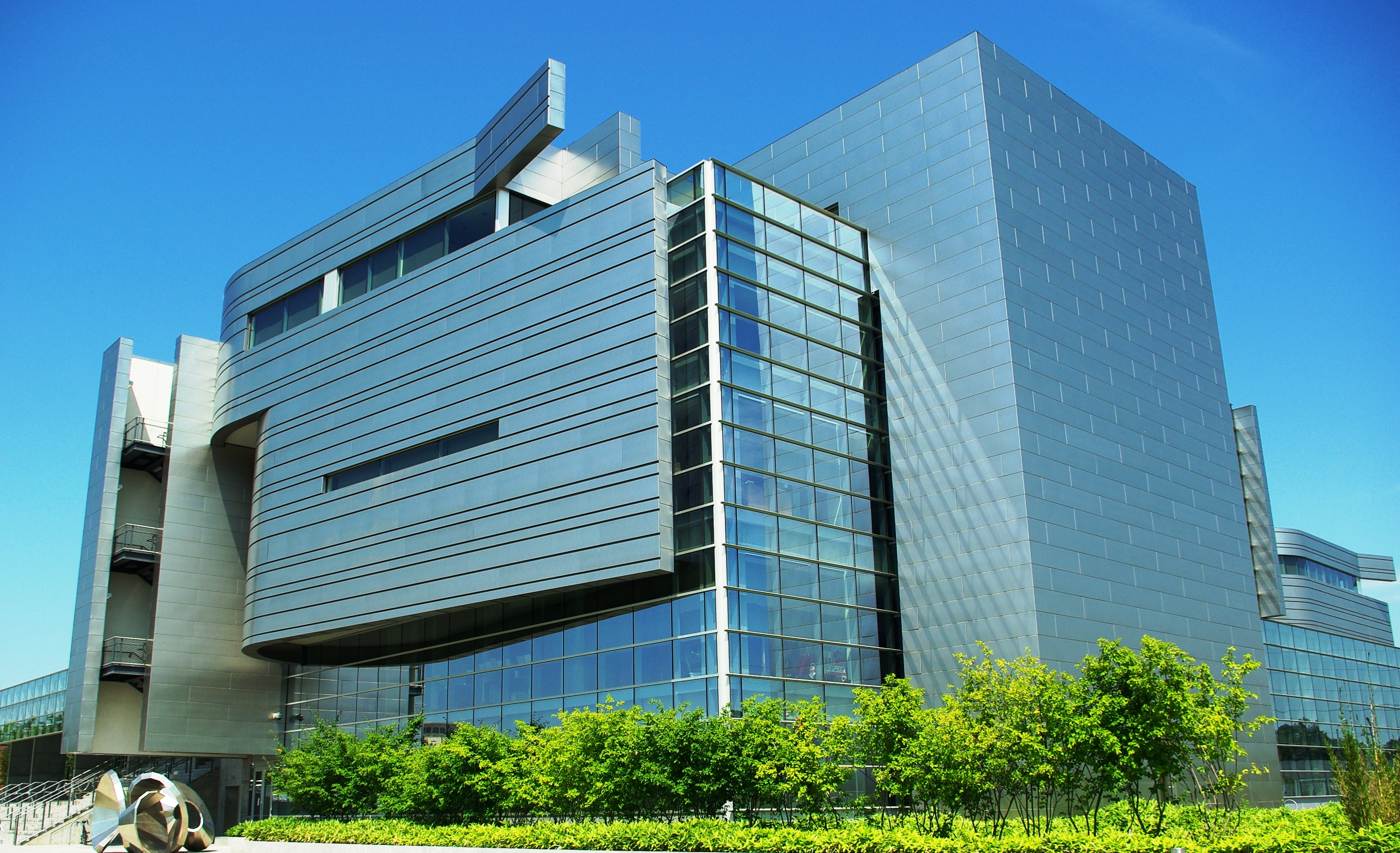
- (2009)
- Interactive map of the Wayne Lyman Morse United States Courthouse area

General information
- Type: courthouse
- Architectural style: Deconstructivist Modern
- Location: 405 East 8th Avenue, Eugene, Oregon
- Coordinates: 44.051085°N 123.086563°W
- Construction started: 1999
- Completed: 2006
- Owner: United States government

Technical details
- Floor count: 6 (5 above grade, 1 below)
- Floor area: 266,742 square feet (24,781.1 m^{2})

Design and construction
- Architects: Morphosis, Santa Monica, California, USA, AIA (Design Architect); DLR Group (Architect of Record)
- Structural engineer: KPFF Consulting Engineers
- Main contractor: JE Dunn Construction, Portland, Oregon, USA
- Awards: AIA COTE Top Ten Award, 2007

The Wayne Lyman Morse United States Courthouse is a federal courthouse located in Eugene, Oregon. Completed in 2006, it serves the District of Oregon as part of the Ninth Judicial Circuit. The courthouse is named in honor of former U.S. Senator Wayne Morse who represented Oregon for 24 years in the Senate and was a Eugene area resident. Located in downtown Eugene, the building overlooks the Willamette River.

Standing six stories tall, the 266,742-square-foot (24,781.1 m^{2}) building contains six courtrooms as well offices for the courts and other federal agencies such as the United States Marshals Service. The courthouse also has offices for Oregon's two U.S. Senators and for the U.S. Representative in the district. Designed by architect Thom Mayne, the building has won several design awards and earned Leadership in Energy and Environmental Design (LEED) Gold certification for energy efficiency. The courthouse was the first new federal courthouse to earn LEED Gold certification.

== History ==
In 1999, the General Services Administration (GSA) held a competition to design a new courthouse for Eugene. Architect Thom Mayne of the Morphosis firm won the design competition, though at the time the location for the new courthouse was hypothetical. The new building was replacing the old Eugene Federal Building on High Street and Sixth Avenue in downtown, which did not have room for expansion and did not meet newer security requirements. Design of the new building began in 2001 for the 4.5-acre (1.8 ha) site. The project was included in the Design in Excellence program, GSA's project that seeks to increase the quality of architecture in federal government projects. The design of the structure received an award from the GSA in 2002.

On April 7, 2004, federal officials held a groundbreaking ceremony at the site for what was estimated to be a $70 million project. The site on East Eighth Avenue and Ferry Street formerly housed an Agripac cannery and is situated along the Willamette River. Local developers and officials hoped the courthouse and a potential new hospital in that area of town would spur further development and revitalize the area. In July 2004, construction began with site preparation including digging out a hole for underground parking. At that time the project was expected to be completed in August 2006.

Plans called for a four-story structure covered with zinc panels on the exterior with a total of 267,000 square feet (24,800 m^{2}), including a three-story-tall atrium. Plans for zinc on the exterior were later changed to stainless steel due to costs. Designed by Mayne and the DLR Group, the building was to be built using concrete and steel with a goal of earning Leadership in Energy and Environmental Design (LEED) certification for sustainability, with large amounts of natural lighting designed to help secure that distinction. On the outside many security measures were incorporated into the design. The building was to include six courtrooms, administrative offices, and space for the offices of the U.S. Marshals Service. Despite security concerns as a federal building, the architect and judge Michael Robert Hogan sought to have an open feel to the structure. Hogan, the chief judge of the United States District Court for the District of Oregon, was the primary government official tasked with working with the architect to design the courthouse.

J. E. Dunn Construction Group served as the general contractor on the project, with the DLR Group serving as the architect of record and as the electrical engineering firm. KPFF Consulting Engineers did the structural engineer work and GLUMAC International completed the plumbing and mechanical engineering.

On July 11, 2005, the 69-foot (21 m) tall building was topped out and the last steel beam put into place. Construction on the project ended in August 2006 with completion in November. During construction crews removed 73,000 square yards (61,000 m^{2}) of material during excavation at the site, poured 15,000 square yards (13,000 m^{2}) of concrete with 1,640 short tons (1,490,000 kg) of rebar, used 1,100 short tons (1,000,000 kg) of structural steel, and on the exterior 48,000 square feet (4,500 m^{2}) of windows and 125 short tons (113,000 kg) of stainless steel were used. On December 1, 2006, the $78.8 million Wayne Lyman Morse U.S. Courthouse was dedicated and officially opened. The total cost to complete the project was $96 million. The Morse Courthouse was completed on budget and on time, but due to budget cuts, elements including a rooftop reflecting pool and etching of the United States Bill of Rights onto the exterior were removed from the project. When it opened it became the first new federal courthouse in the United States to earn LEED Gold certification.

== Design ==
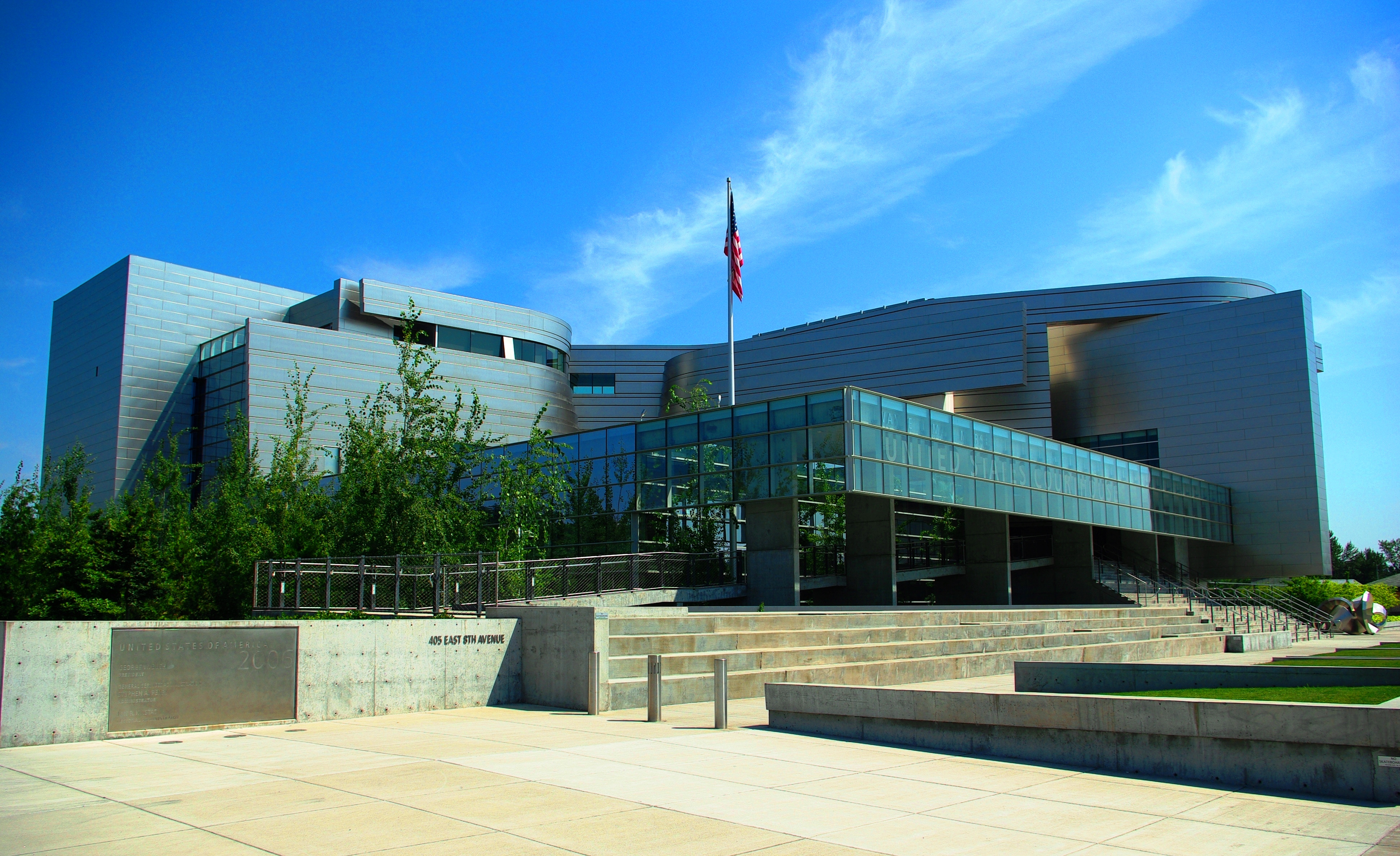
View of the front and entrance

The finished building reflected two major influences: Judge Hogan had wanted a more traditional courthouse, similar in style to the United States Supreme Court building, while architect Mayne pushed for a modern glass and steel structure. Though opposed at first to each other's design thoughts, the two worked together to incorporate elements of each person's ideas. After years of working on the design process, including 25 revisions, the two compromised on elements with Hogan responsible for pushing for a set of steps leading to the main floor on the second level as well as the feel of the courtrooms. While Mayne had a reputation as an architect of confrontation and dislocation, this was one of three GSA Design in Excellence programs he had worked on with the artistically conservative federal government. Regarding them, he said: "Obviously, those are buildings that require negotiation. I couldn't be too bad."

The completed design resulted in a curving structure standing five stories tall with 266,742 square feet (24,781.1 m^{2}) of space. The bottom two floors are covered in glass and house offices, while the top three floors are covered in ribbons of steel and primarily house courtrooms. Three pavilions rise from the main structure to create these upper floors where the six courtrooms are located. Each of the top three floors have two courtrooms; two for the judges of federal district court, two for magistrate judges of the court, and two for the bankruptcy court, with these courtrooms spread out amongst the pavilions; two per pavilion and all on the third floor. Chambers for the judges are located above the courtrooms and include a seventh chamber for a visiting judge. On the same level as the judge's chambers are two law libraries for the court. The three floors featuring the courtrooms are joined to the rest of the building via the 85-foot (26 m) tall atrium. Located on the second floor is the jury assembly room, which when not in use by the court is used as exhibit and meeting space.

The courtrooms vary from as large as 3,000 square feet (280 m^{2}) to as small as 1,500 square feet (140 m^{2}) and are in a pear-shaped design. Designs for the courtrooms were partly based on the courtrooms of the Bordeaux Law Courts in France. The jury box is recessed and does not resemble a traditional jury box. The courtrooms feature ribbons of wood panels on the walls in rooms that narrow as they reach the bench at the front. The wood is primarily cherry with walnut accents. Natural light is let into the courtrooms from small opening in the walls. Videoconferencing is available in the courtrooms.

In addition to the natural light from the atrium and skylights, the building is further illuminated inside by lightboxes and screens that are part of the artwork. Other interior details include steel mesh, a central courtyard, panels of stainless steel, pillars with burnished steel, and excerpts from the United States Constitution on the wall. Also, the areas leading into the elevators have clear panels in the floor, and the main staircase is also constructed partly of transparent materials, with the steps made of gray slate. The exterior ribbons of stainless steel also extend into the lobby of the building.

The exterior features a large set of stairs that leads from the street level to the main entrance on the second floor. This 240-foot (73 m) wide grand entrance also serves a security function of reducing the chance of a car bomb reaching the main entrance. Other security measures in the design include the underground parking and setting the courtrooms back from the street. The facility was designed as a Security Level IV facility by the government. Other exterior features include structural elements left exposed along with portions of the curved metal skin that extend out from the building. Mayne, the building's architect, stated that it was "the language of the ribbon" to describe the exterior design.

=== Artwork, LEED, and awards ===
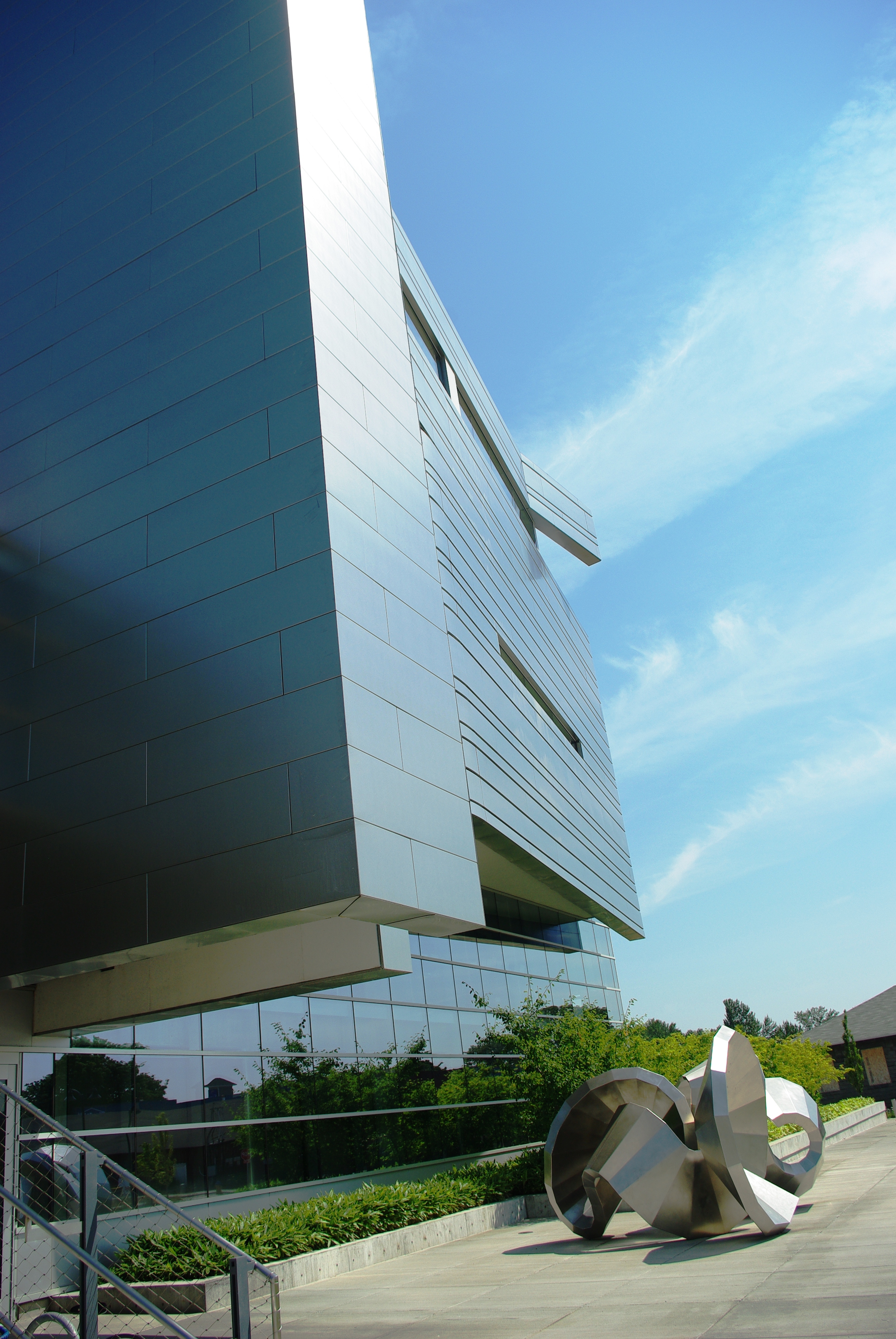
Exterior sculpture at the courthouse

Artist Matthew Ritchie was commissioned to create much of the building's artwork. One piece is a metal sculpture located on the exterior in the courtyard that mimics the nearby Willamette River's watershed, and includes metal spheres attached to the line shaped metal. The other main piece of art is a piece with two lightboxes on the interior that display different images as one moves along the display that uses lenticular glass. Images represent themes of the river and of legal history.

Energy efficient and sustainability features designed into the project led to a LEED Gold certification from the U.S. Green Building Council. Elements that led to this include landscaping that reduces runoff from rainwater, much natural light, a more efficient HVAC system that is located under the floors, and a location near public transit. Landscaping includes using drought resistant native species to reduce the need for irrigation. The floor-based HVAC system is more energy efficient and helps keep the temperature of the entire building more even and uses radiant heating and cooling. Additionally, the construction used environmentally friendly sealants, carpets, paints, and adhesives as well as preventing 90% of the construction waste from entering landfills. Also, potable water usage is reduced by 40% due to the use of low-flow sinks, showers, and toilets. The contractor also recycled 90% of the materials from the building that previously occupied the site.

In addition to the LEED certification, the building also won a Progressive Architecture Award in 2004 from Architecture magazine and AIA/COTE award from Architect magazine in 2007. The Chicago Athenaeum also gave the design an award in 2007 as part of its American Architecture Awards. The Morse Courthouse was also the first U.S. courthouse included at the Venice Biennale of Architecture. The Oregonian newspaper called the courthouse "the most architecturally important new building in Oregon in decades".

== Tenants ==
The bottom two floors of the facility house offices, including those for the federal courts, the U.S. Attorney's Office, the U.S. Marshals Service, and U.S. Probation and Pretrial Services. Additionally, there are offices for both of Oregon's United States Senators and an office for a single member of the United States House of Representatives. Representative Peter DeFazio of Oregon's 4th congressional district uses that office.
