= San Francisco Federal Building =

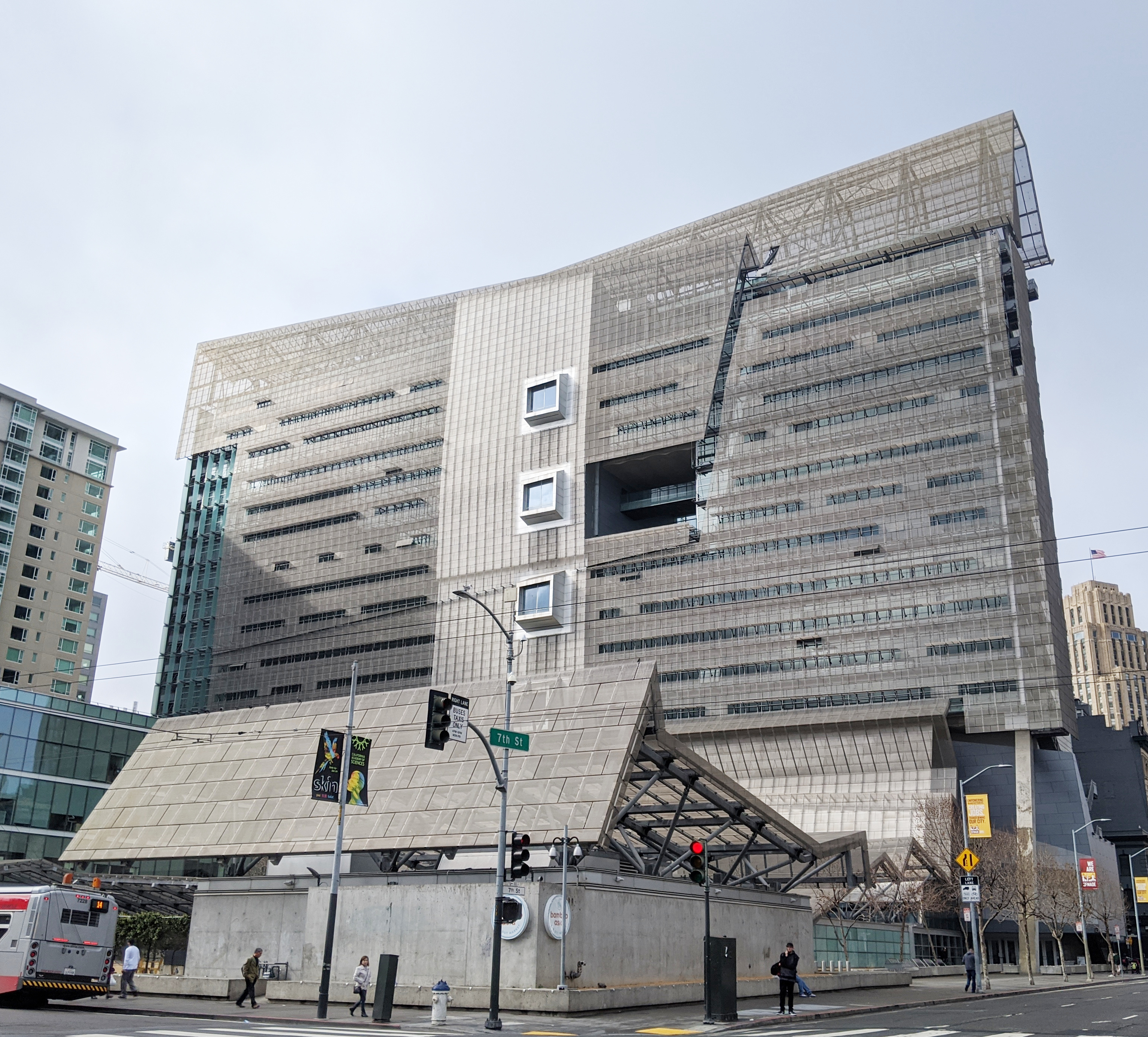
- Main structure of the federal building, with plaza in the foreground

- Location within San Francisco Location within California Location within the United States

General information
- Status: Completed
- Type: Government offices
- Architectural style: Deconstructivism
- Location: 90 Seventh Street; San Francisco, California
- Coordinates: 37°46′45″N 122°24′43″W
- Construction started: 2003
- Opening: 2007
- Cost: US$144 million

Height
- Roof: 234 ft (71.3 m)

Technical details
- Floor count: 18
- Floor area: 605,000 sq ft (56,206 m^{2})

Design and construction
- Architects: Thom Mayne of Morphosis; SmithGroup
- Developer: U.S. General Services Administration
- Engineer: Arup
- Main contractor: Hunt Construction Group; Webcor Builders

The Speaker Nancy Pelosi Federal Building, formally the San Francisco Federal Building, is an 18-story, 234 ft-tall (71.3 m) building at the corner of Mission and 7th streets in the South of Market neighborhood of San Francisco, California. The federal building was designed by the Morphosis architectural firm, as a supplement to the Phillip Burton Federal Building several blocks away. Thom Mayne of Morphosis designed the building using a juxtaposition of gray concrete walls, perforated metal panels, and custom, faceted wood ceilings.

The building was designed to be a 'green' building consuming less than half the power of a standard office tower. Utilizing natural light to illuminate 80 percent of the building helped it achieve worldwide recognition as the first Federal Building to be certified under the USGBC's Leadership in Energy and Environmental Design (LEED) criteria. Its southern wall is draped with translucent panels of perforated stainless steel (3 by 8 feet (0.91 by 2.44 m) in size), intended to accumulate solar heat and thereby create an upward air flow, which in turn causes cooler air to enter the building through sensor-controlled windows, achieving an air conditioning effect.

The building features some elevators which stop on every third floor to promote employee interaction and health. Users of the building exit the elevators and walk either up or down one floor via stairs. There are also elevators which stop on every floor for users unable or unwilling to negotiate stairs.

== History ==
The construction budget and cost for the building was $144 million. The architect's decision to eliminate the usual HVAC system saved $11 million in construction costs. The design's use of extended, folded metal sunshading at ground level, which shades portions of the plaza and ground floor program, required extensive galvanized steel bracing, adding millions in materials and fabrication costs.

Morphosis' design was selected at least partly because of its projected energy efficiency; a requirement of the GSA's brief. In a 2010 post occupancy evaluation of 22 GSA Buildings, the San Francisco Federal Building outperformed other buildings within the GSA portfolio, with lower energy use intensity, water use, CO_{2} emissions, and energy and operating costs. The building demonstrated a notably low measurement of Energy Use (kBTU) per GSF of 48, compared to a national average of 88 Energy Use (kBTU) per GSF. It received an Energy Star Score of 96.

At the time of design, the GSA did not mandate LEED certification, and the building was not evaluated for it until after construction. LEED certification is given based on checklist of sustainable design credits, considering water efficiency, energy, materials, innovation, and site response. The building received silver LEED qualification with highlighted features including: all on-site parking is underground reducing the urban heat-island effect, drip irrigation and dual-flush valves were used to reduce potable-water consumption. Low- or zerotoxicity building materials were used during construction, and green cleaning custodial products are used during building operation. During construction, over 90% of construction waste was diverted from landfill through separation and recycling.

In 2020, then-President Donald Trump issued an Executive Order on Promoting Beautiful Federal Civic Architecture. The order mentioned the building as an unsatisfactory design, saying, "GSA selected an architect to design the San Francisco Federal Building who describes his designs as 'art-for-art’s-sake' architecture, intended primarily for architects to appreciate. While elite architects praised the resulting building, many San Franciscans consider it one of the ugliest structures in their city." This executive order was revoked by President Joe Biden in February 2021, but was reinstated by President Trump during his second term in 2025.

The building was named after Speaker of the House Nancy Pelosi in the Consolidated Appropriations Act, 2023.

== Reception ==
The San Francisco Chronicle's architecture critic John King called the building "both daunting and dazzling, up to and including the stainless steel panels that fold over the broad concrete frame like some immense origami whim. Like it or not, this is architecture at its provocative best. The 18-story structure and its four-story annex show how buildings fit together. They demonstrate that simple materials can be used in fresh ways, and they prod you to think about how design and the environment are linked." According to his colleague at the Los Angeles Times, Christopher Hawthorne, the building "shows what happens when a celebrated American architect is compelled [...] to embrace sustainability. And it dramatizes a clash between the prerogatives of architectural creativity and the basics of sustainable design". He called the result a "hulking, aggressive tower [... and] perhaps the most ambitious of the federal government’s effort, through the General Services Administration’s 'design excellence' program, to make new courthouses and office buildings models of forward-looking design."

The San Francisco Federal Building has been called an example of the "innovative public building projects that embrace contemporary design strategies and material approaches" that were enabled by the 1962 "Guiding Principles for Federal Architecture" directive.

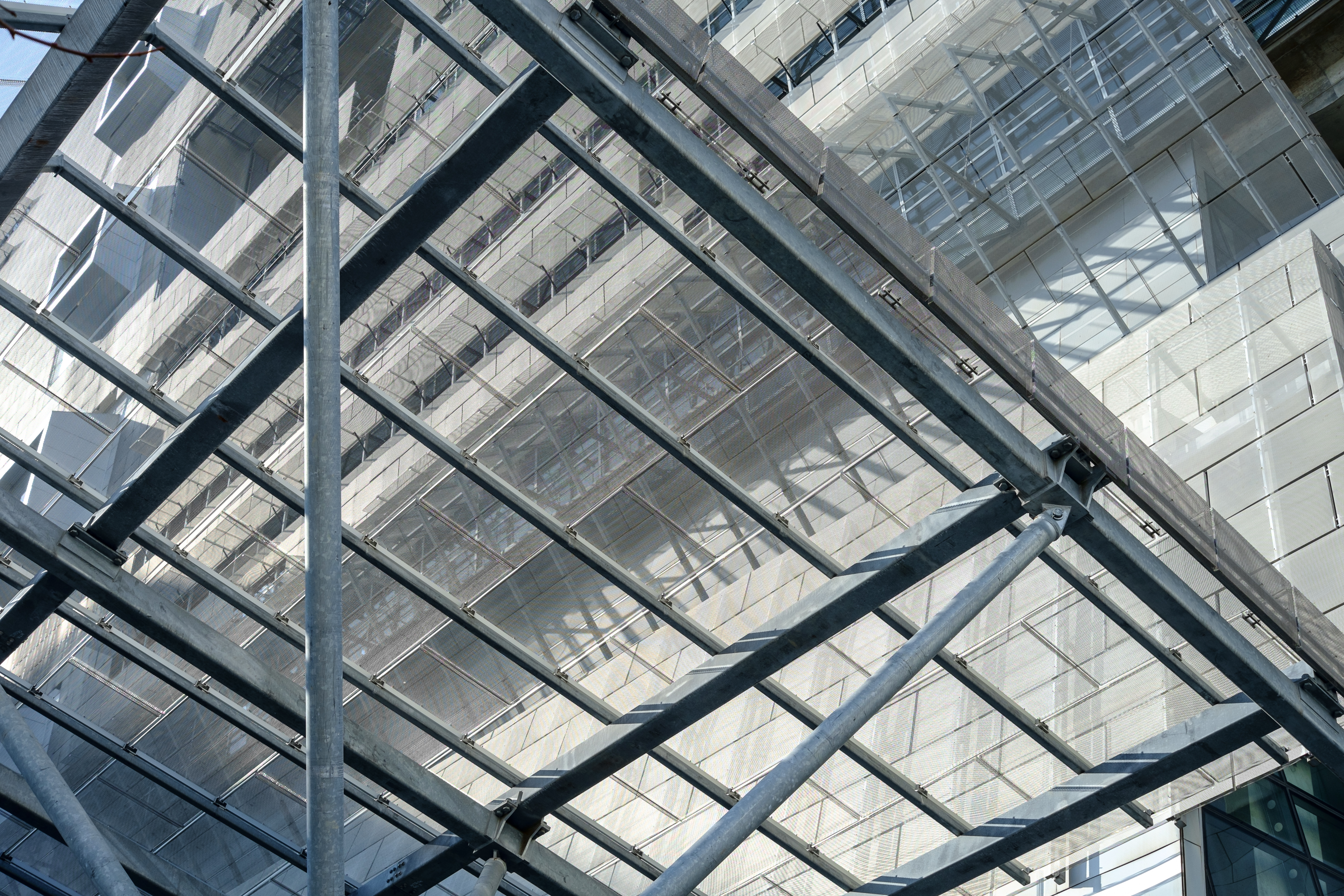
Detail of the building

The building has been criticized as being dysfunctional for its employees. According to an employee interviewed by BeyondChron.com, "Workers seek to relieve the heat by opening windows, which not only sends papers flying, but, depending on their proximity to the opening, makes creating a stable temperature for all workers near impossible ... some employees must use umbrellas to keep the sun out of their cubicles."

Mayne believed that the federal government should be a model in the promotion of worker health and exercise. This led Morphosis to specify passenger elevators that stop only at every third floor, encouraging employees and visitors to walk up or down one or two flights of stairs to reach their destinations. There are also elevators available that stop at every floor.

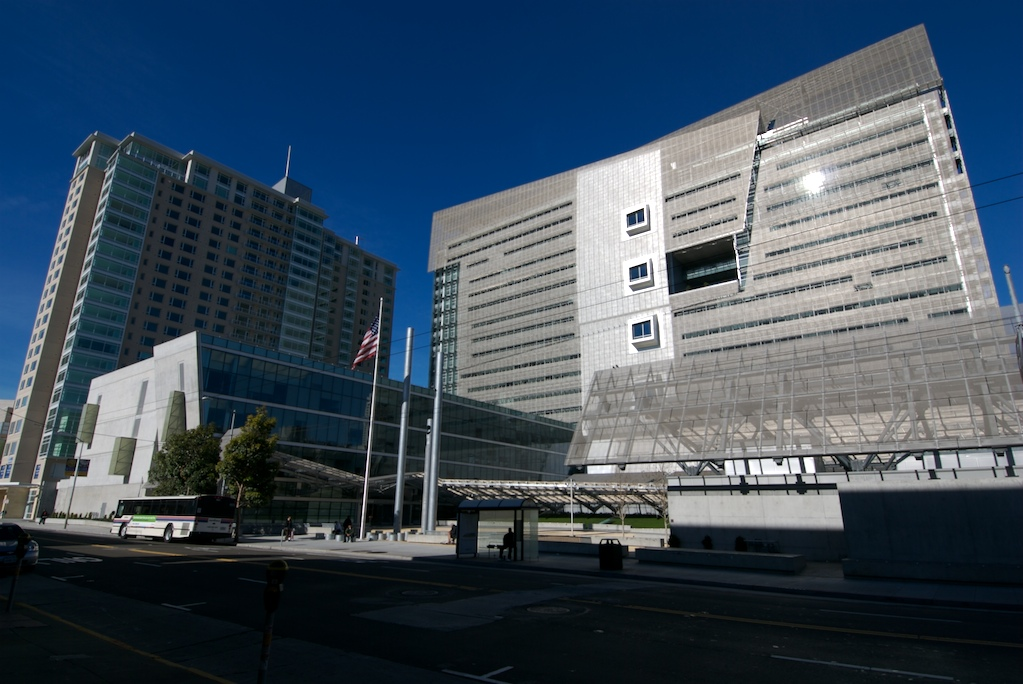
View of the entire building, consisting of the tall structure at right and the lower annex structure in the left foreground, which frame a plaza

Instead of a cafeteria inside the building, the Federal Building has a public cafe on the plaza, which is open to both employees and the general public.

In 2010 the GSA commissioned a survey of employees in 22 federal buildings nationwide, to determine employee satisfaction with their workplaces. The San Francisco Federal Building was included in this study even though commissioning was still underway. The buildings included in the study scored between a low of 13 and a high of 98 percent employee satisfaction; seventeen of the 22 buildings scored above 50 percent employee satisfaction. While incorporating many green concepts more aggressively than other buildings, the lowest ranked building for employee satisfaction was the San Francisco Federal Building, with a rating of just 13 percent; the next-lowest was considered twice as satisfactory, at 26 percent. The San Francisco building scored well below the median in the categories of thermal comfort, lighting and acoustics.

== Awards ==
The San Francisco Federal Building won a Design Award from the AIA San Francisco chapter in 2008. The award praised the building's open spaces and environmentally friendly design.

The building earned LEED Silver certification from USGBC.

In June 2012, the San Francisco Federal Building was named by BOMA International as The Outstanding Building of the Year (TOBY) in the government category. GSA was recognized by the commercial real estate industry for quality in commercial buildings and excellence in building management and operations.

== See also ==
- List of tallest buildings in San Francisco
