= Caltrans =

Executive transportation department of California, US

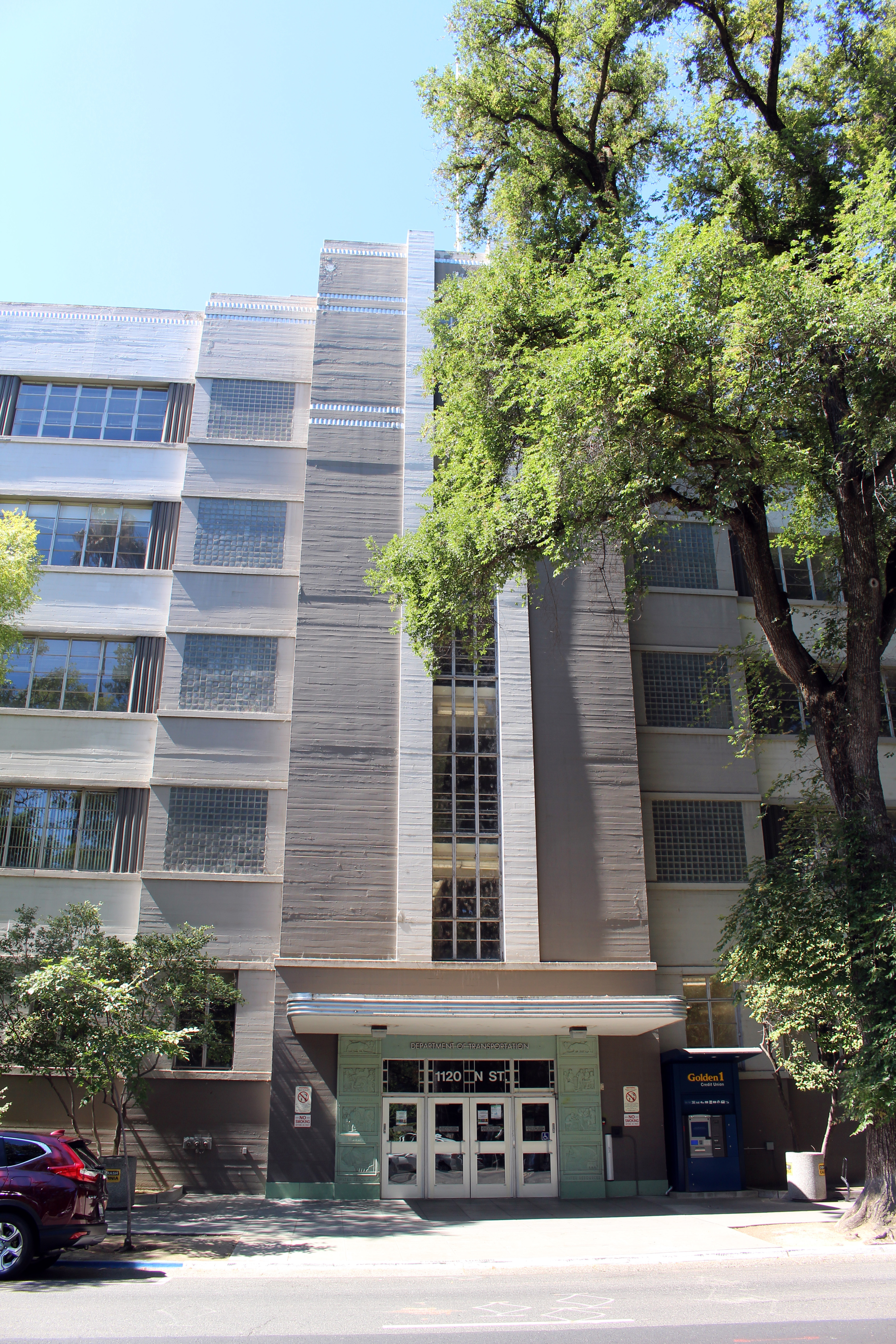
- Caltrans headquarters in Sacramento

Agency overview
- Formed: 1973; 53 years ago
- Preceding agencies: California Bureau of Highways; California Department of Highways
- Jurisdiction: California State Government
- Headquarters: 1120 N Street, Sacramento, California; 38.574564°N 121.493660°W
- Agency executive: Dina El-Tawansy, Director
- Parent agency: California State Transportation Agency (CalSTA)
- Key document: Ch. 1253, Assembly Bill 69 (1972)
- Website: dot.ca.gov

The California Department of Transportation, branded as Caltrans, is an executive department of the U.S. state of California. Headquartered in Sacramento, it is part of the cabinet-level California State Transportation Agency (CalSTA). Among its duties, Caltrans manages the state's highway system, which includes the California Freeway and Expressway System, supports public transportation systems throughout the state, and provides funding and oversight for three state-supported Amtrak intercity rail routes (Capitol Corridor, Pacific Surfliner and Gold Runner) which are collectively branded as Amtrak California.

Caltrans began operations in 1973, succeeding a series of state agencies that date back to the establishment of the California Bureau of Highways in 1895. In 2015, Caltrans released a new mission statement: "Provide a safe, sustainable, integrated and efficient transportation system to enhance California's economy and livability."

== History ==
=== Predecessor agencies ===
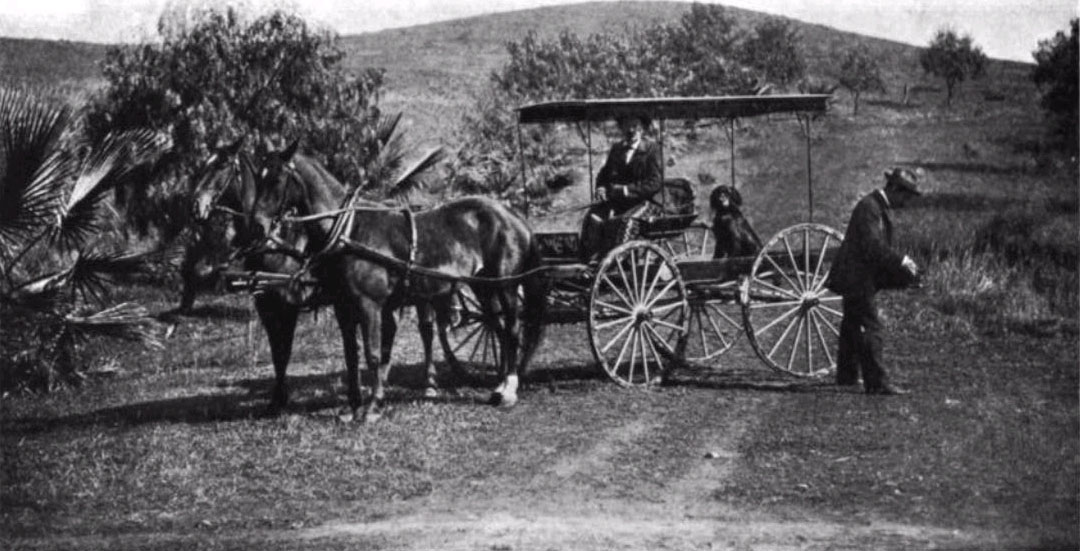
The Bureau of Highways with their buckboard wagon in Riverside County, 1896

The earliest predecessor of Caltrans was the Bureau of Highways, which was established by the California State Legislature and signed into law by Governor James Budd in 1895. The Bureau of Highways consisted of three commissioners who were charged with analyzing the roads of the state and making recommendations for their improvement. At the time, California's roads were purely a local responsibility instead of the state, primarily consisting of crude dirt roads maintained by the counties, as well as some paved streets in certain cities. This ad hoc system no longer became adequate for the needs of the state's rapidly growing population. After the commissioners submitted their report to the governor on November 25, 1896, the state legislature replaced the Bureau with the Department of Highways.

Due to the state's weak fiscal condition and corrupt politics, little progress was made until 1907, when the state legislature replaced the Department of Highways with the Department of Engineering, within which there was a Division of Highways. California voters approved an $18 million (equivalent to $622M in 2025) bond issue for the construction of a state highway system in 1910, and the first California Highway Commission was convened in 1911. On August 7, 1912, the department broke ground on its first construction project, the section of El Camino Real between South San Francisco and Burlingame (now a part of present-day California State Route 82). The year 1912 also saw the founding of the Transportation Laboratory and the creation of seven administrative divisions, which are the predecessors of present-day Caltrans districts 1 through 7:

1. Willits (Note: Willits was the northernmost California Coast Range city connected to the national rail network when the headquarters were established there.) Mercantile Building for Del Norte, Humboldt, Lake, and Mendocino counties
2. Redding C.R.Briggs Building for Lassen, Modoc, Shasta, Siskiyou, Tehama, and Trinity counties
3. Sacramento Forum Building for Alpine, Amador, Butte, Calaveras, Colusa, El Dorado, Glenn, Nevada, Placer, Plumas, Sacramento, San Joaquin, Sierra, Solano, Stanislaus, Sutter, Tuolumne, Yolo, and Yuba counties
4. San Francisco Rialto Building for Alameda, Contra Costa, Marin, Napa, San Francisco, Santa Clara, Santa Cruz, San Mateo, and Sonoma counties
5. San Luis Obispo Union National Bank Building for Monterey, San Benito, Santa Barbara, and San Luis Obispo counties
6. Fresno Forsythe Building (Note: The Forsythe Building was shared with the original Gottschalks department store.) for Fresno, Inyo, Kern, Kings, Madera, Mariposa, Merced, Mono, and Tulare counties
7. Los Angeles Union Oil Building for Imperial, Los Angeles, Orange, Riverside, San Bernardino, San Diego, and Ventura counties

The state legislature began requiring vehicle registration in 1913 and allocated the resulting funds to support regular highway maintenance, which began the next year. In 1921, the state legislature converted the Department of Engineering into the Department of Public Works, which continued to have a Division of Highways, and also authorized the creation of what would become District 8 in San Bernardino, District 9 in Bishop, and District 10 in Stockton. The state legislature later enacted an 1933 amendment to the State Highway Classification Act of 1927, which added over 6,700 miles of county roads to the state highway system, and authorized the establishment of District 11 in San Diego to help manage this massive expansion.

The enactment of the Collier–Burns Highway Act of 1947 after "a lengthy and bitter legislative battle" became a watershed moment. The act "placed California highway's program on a sound financial basis" by doubling vehicle registration fees and raising gasoline and diesel fuel taxes from 3 cents ($0.43 in 2025) to 4.5 cents ($0.65 in 2025) per gallon. All these taxes were again raised further in 1953 and 1963. The state also obtained extensive federal funding from the Federal-Aid Highway Act of 1956 for the construction of its portion of the Interstate Highway System. Over the next two decades after Collier-Burns, the state "embarked on a massive highway construction program" in which nearly all of the now-extant state highway system was either constructed or upgraded. In hindsight, the period from 1940 to 1969 can be characterized as the "Golden Age" of California's state highway construction program.

=== Establishment of Caltrans ===
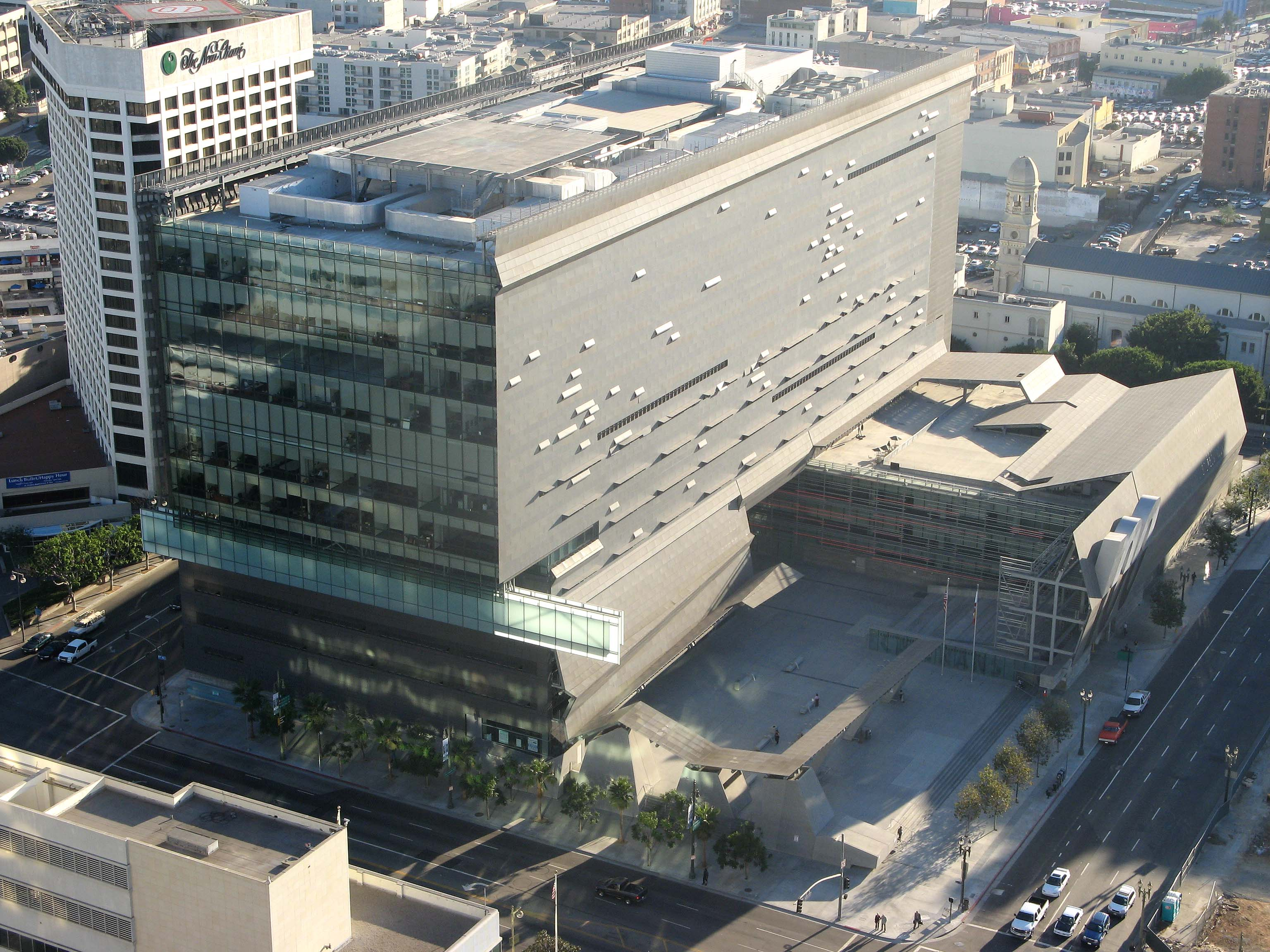
Caltrans District 7 Headquarters in Los Angeles, designed by Thom Mayne.

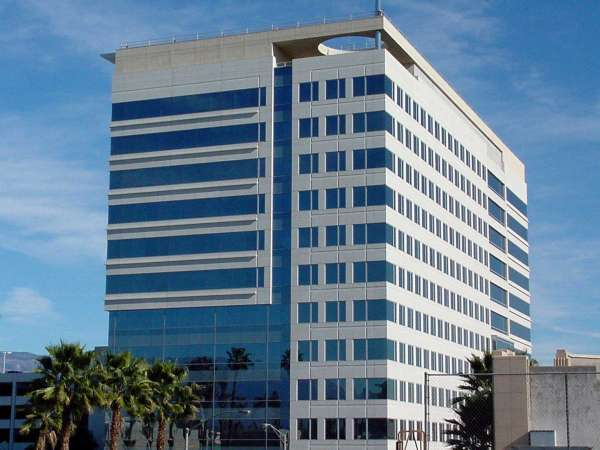
Caltrans District 8 Headquarters in San Bernardino

In 1967, Governor Ronald Reagan formed a Task Force Committee on Transportation to study the state transportation system and recommend major reforms. One of the proposals of the task force was the creation of a State Transportation Board as a permanent advisory board on state transportation policy; the board would later merge into the California Transportation Commission in 1978. In September 1971, the State Transportation Board proposed the creation of a state department of transportation charged with responsibility "for performing and integrating transportation planning for all modes." Governor Reagan mentioned this proposal in his 1972 State of the State address, and Assemblyman Wadie P. Deddeh introduced Assembly Bill 69 to that effect, which was duly passed by the state legislature and signed into law by Reagan later that same year. AB 69 merged three existing departments to create the Department of Transportation, of which the most important was the Department of Public Works and its Division of Highways. The California Department of Transportation began official operations on July 1, 1973. The new agency was organized into six divisions: Highways, Mass Transportation, Aeronautics, Transportation Planning, Legal, and Administrative Services.

Caltrans went through a difficult period of transformation during the 1970s, as its institutional focus shifted from highway construction to highway maintenance. The agency was forced to contend with declining revenues, increasing construction and maintenance costs (especially the skyrocketing cost of maintaining the vast highway system built over the past three prior decades), widespread freeway revolts, and new environmental laws. In 1970, the enactment of the National Environmental Policy Act and the California Environmental Quality Act forced Caltrans to devote significant time, money, people, and other resources to confronting issues such as "air and water quality, hazardous waste, archaeology, historic preservation, and noise abatement." The devastating 1971 San Fernando earthquake compelled the agency to recognize that its existing design standards had not adequately accounted for earthquake stress and that numerous existing structures needed expensive seismic retrofitting.

In 1976, Caltrans began promoting intercity passenger rail service, including providing financial assistance to regional Amtrak routes that became branded as Amtrak California.

Maintenance and construction costs grew at twice the inflation rate in the 1970s era of high inflation; the reluctance of one governor after another to raise fuel taxes in accordance with inflation meant that California ranked dead last in the United States in per-capita transportation spending by 1983. During the 1980s and 1990s, Caltrans concentrated on "the upgrading, rehabilitation, and maintenance of the existing system," plus occasional gap closure and realignment projects. To help manage the additional work in the Los Angeles area, District 12 was established in 1987 in Santa Ana to just serve Orange County.

== Innovations ==
The history of Caltrans and its predecessor agencies during the 20th century was marked by many firsts. It was one of the first agencies in the United States to paint centerlines on highways statewide; the first to build a freeway west of the Mississippi River; the first to build a four-level stack interchange; the first to develop and deploy non-reflective raised pavement markers, better known as Botts' dots; and one of the first to implement dedicated freeway-to-freeway connector ramps for high-occupancy vehicle lanes.

== Districts ==
Caltrans district map

For administrative purposes, Caltrans divides the State of California into 12 districts, supervised by district offices. Like many state agencies, Caltrans maintains its headquarters in Sacramento, which is covered by District 3. While most districts cover multiple counties, District 12 is the only district with one county (Orange County). Kern County is the only county in multiple districts, split between Districts 6 and 9.

District	Counties served	Headquarters
1	Del Norte, Humboldt, Lake, and Mendocino	Eureka
2	Lassen, Modoc, Plumas, Shasta, Siskiyou, Tehama, and Trinity	Redding
3	Butte, Colusa, El Dorado, Glenn, Nevada, Placer, Sacramento, Sierra, Sutter, Yolo, and Yuba	Marysville
4	Alameda, Contra Costa, Marin, Napa, San Francisco, San Mateo, Santa Clara, Solano, and Sonoma	Oakland
5	Monterey, San Benito, San Luis Obispo, Santa Barbara, and Santa Cruz	San Luis Obispo
6	Madera, Fresno, Tulare, Kings, and the western areas of Kern	Fresno
7	Los Angeles and Ventura	Los Angeles
8	Riverside and San Bernardino	San Bernardino
9	Inyo, Mono, and the eastern areas of Kern	Bishop
10	Alpine, Amador, Calaveras, Mariposa, Merced, San Joaquin, Stanislaus, and Tuolumne	Stockton
11	Imperial and San Diego	San Diego
12	Orange	Santa Ana

== See also ==
- Transportation in California
- State highways in California
- California Manual on Uniform Traffic Control Devices
- United States Department of Transportation
