= Thom Mayne =

American architect

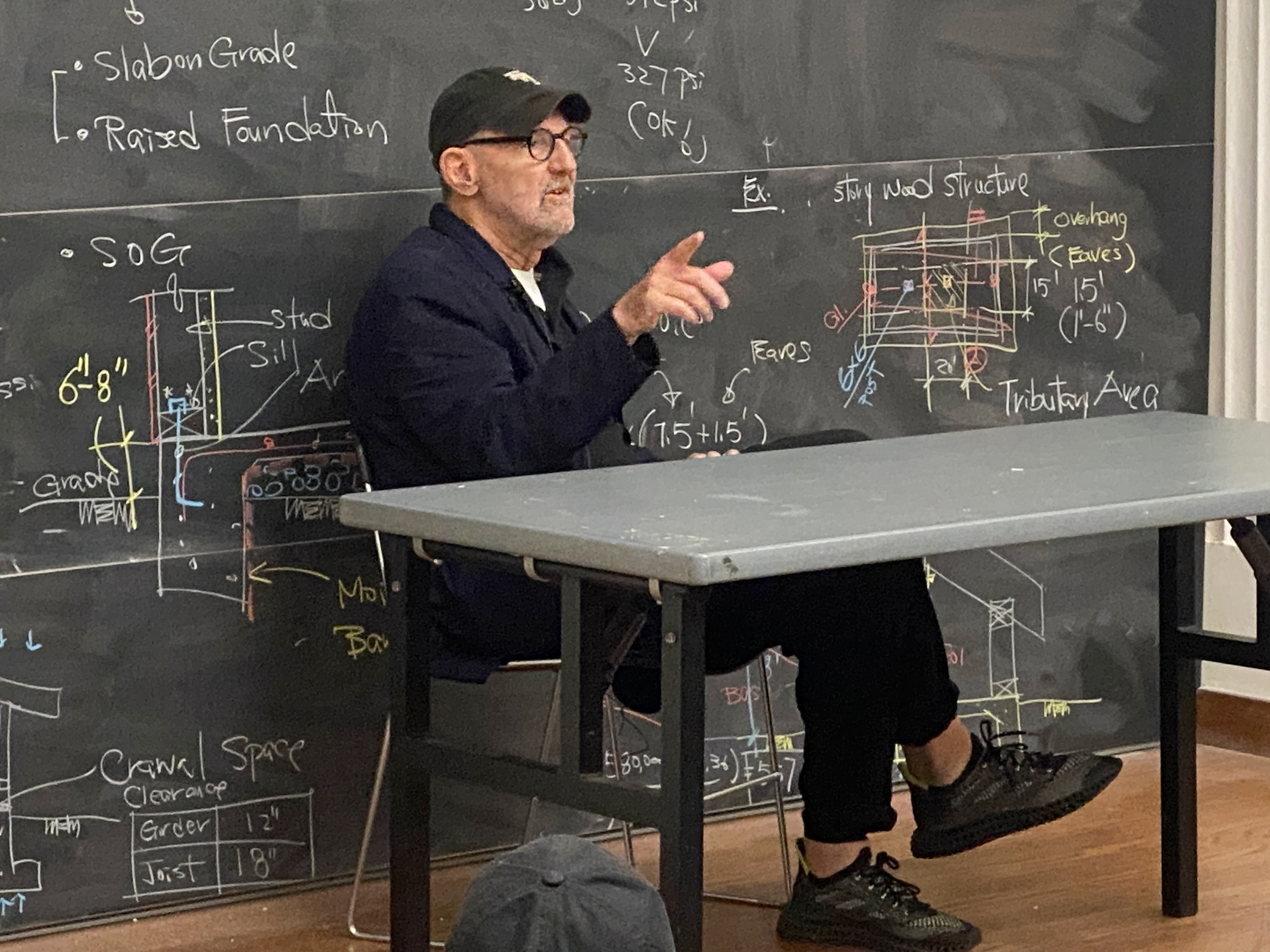
- Thom Mayne speaking at the USC School of Architecture in 2023
- Born: January 19, 1944 (age 82); Waterbury, Connecticut, U.S.
- Education: University of Southern California, Harvard University
- Occupation: Architect
- Awards: AIA Gold Medal; Pritzker Prize; Rome Prize
- Practice: Morphosis
- Buildings: Diamond Ranch High School, University of Toronto Graduate House, Caltrans District 7 Headquarters, Wayne L. Morse United States Courthouse, San Francisco Federal Building, New Academic Building at 41 Cooper Square, Perot Museum of Nature and Science, Emerson College Los Angeles
- Website: www.morphosis.com

Thom Mayne (born January 19, 1944) is an American architect. He is based in Los Angeles. In 1972, Mayne helped found the Southern California Institute of Architecture (SCI-Arc), where he is a trustee and the coordinator of the Design of Cities postgraduate program. Since then he has held teaching positions at SCI-Arc, the California State Polytechnic University, Pomona (Cal Poly Pomona) and the University of California, Los Angeles (UCLA). He is principal of Morphosis Architects, an architectural firm based in Culver City, California and New York City, New York. Mayne received the Pritzker Architecture Prize in March 2005.

== Early life and education ==
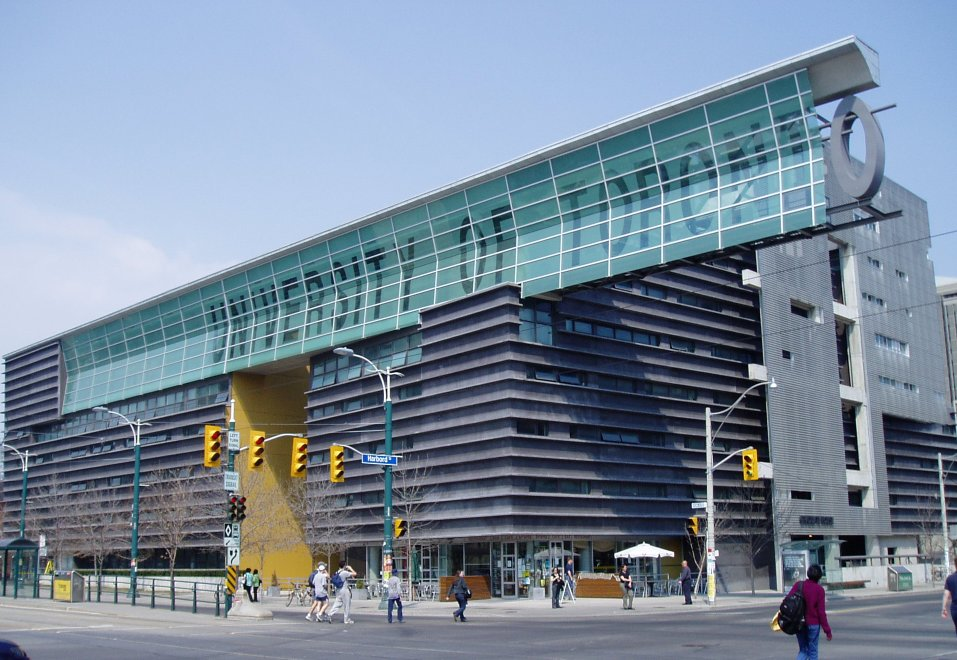
University of Toronto Graduate House (2000)

Mayne was born in Waterbury, Connecticut. He studied architecture at the University of Southern California (1968) and also studied at Harvard University's Graduate School of Design in 1978, with a social agenda and urban planning focus, receiving his bachelor's degree, he began working as an urban planner under Korean-born architect Ki Suh Park. During that time, he recalls that "policy and planning were not going to work for me" and that he "needed a more tangible resolution." Mayne found himself living on a commune with the grass-roots group Campaign for Economic Democracy, many of whom became his earliest clients.

In 1972, Mayne abruptly left Cal Poly Pomona and collaborated with five other students and educators whom he met at while at USC, to create the Southern California Institute of Architecture, or SCI-Arc. The rift was due to differences between the dean at Cal Poly at the time and Ray Kappe, who headed the school's architecture department. The goal of the new institute was to reinvigorate formal architectural education with a keener sense of social conscience. SCI-Arc was "to bring to Los Angeles the critical attitude toward the profession that was being practiced at Cooper Union in New York and the Architectural Association in London."

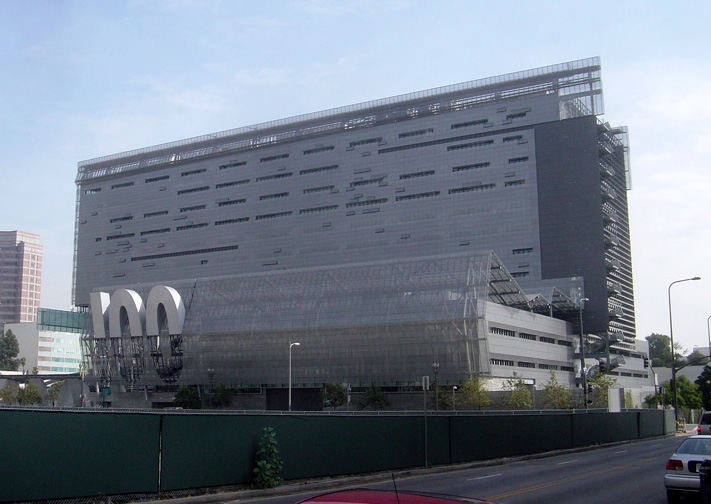
Caltrans District 7 Headquarters, Los Angeles (2004)

University of Cincinnati Rec Center (2006)

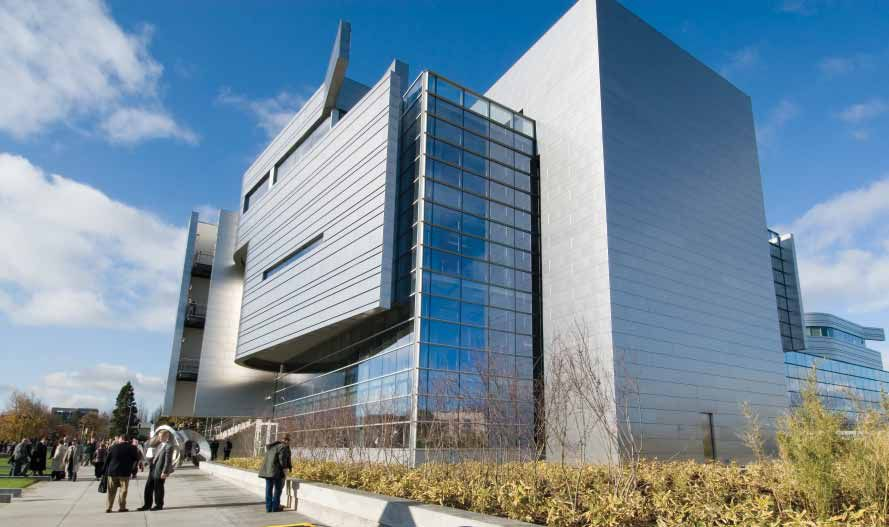
Morse Courthouse in Eugene, Oregon (2006)

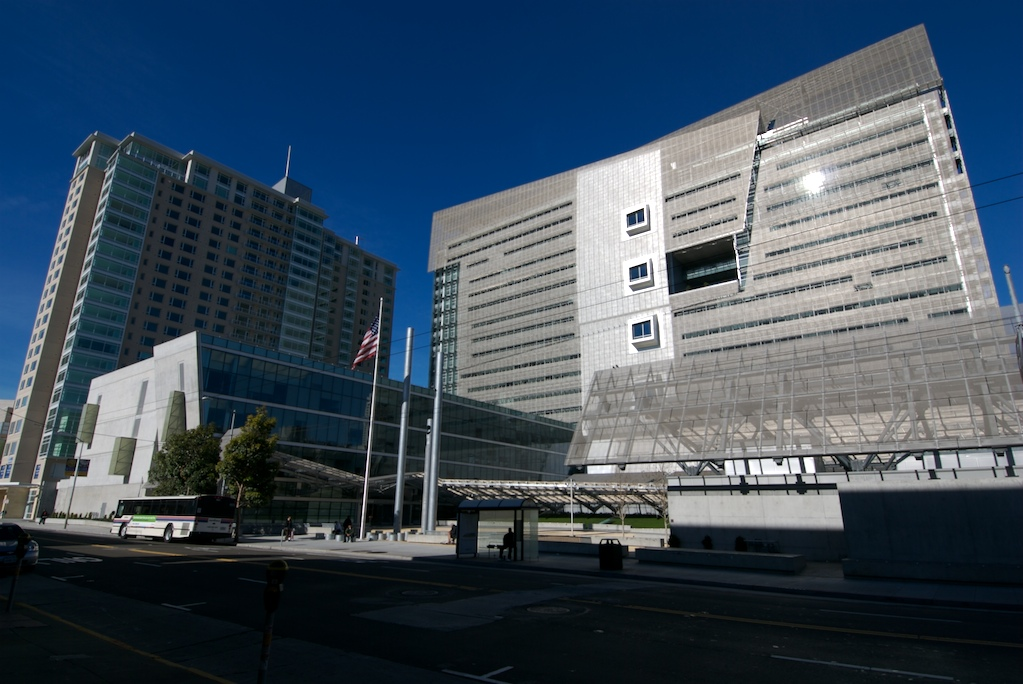
San Francisco Federal Building (2006)

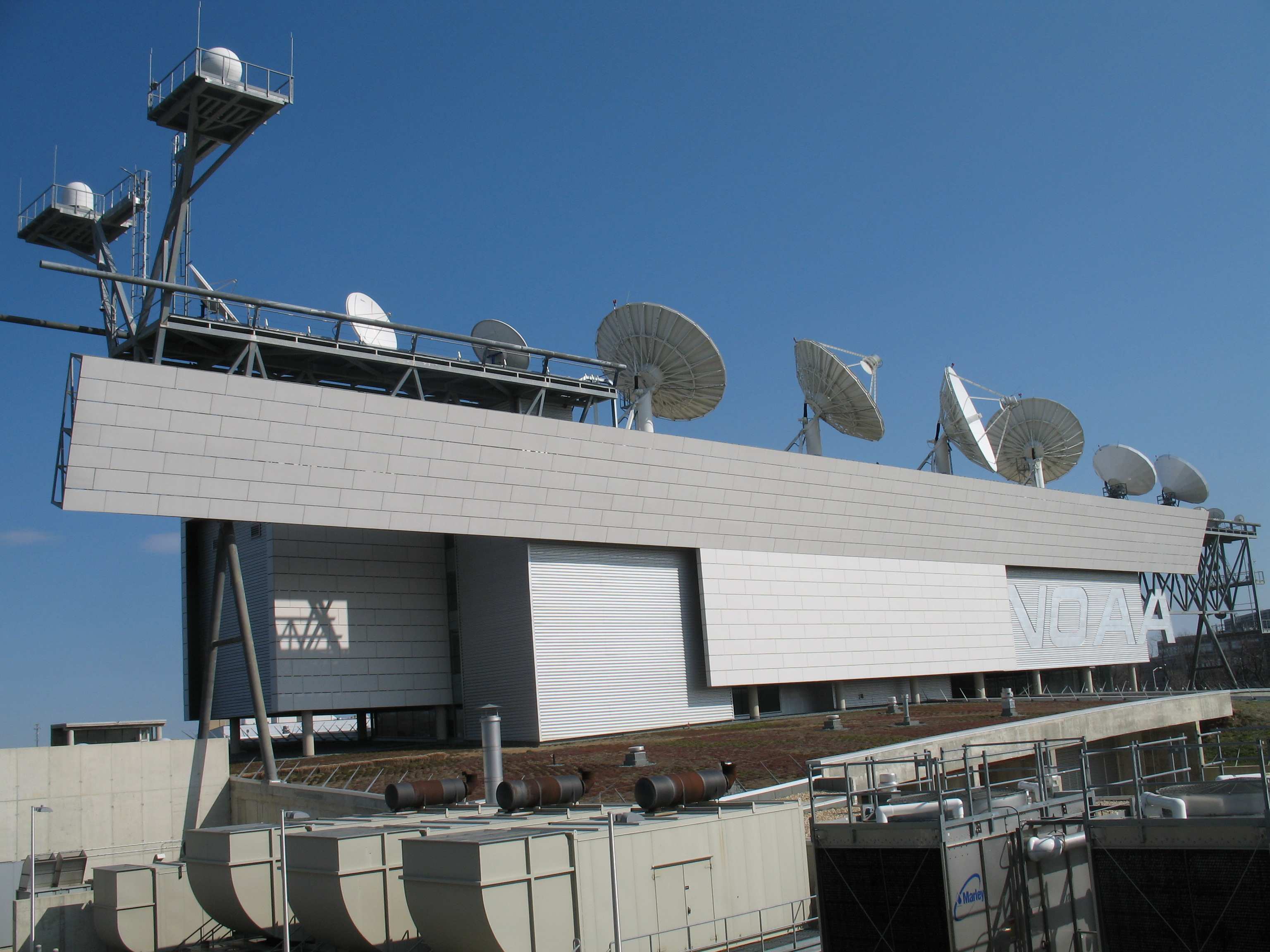
NOAA National Satellite Operations Center (2007)

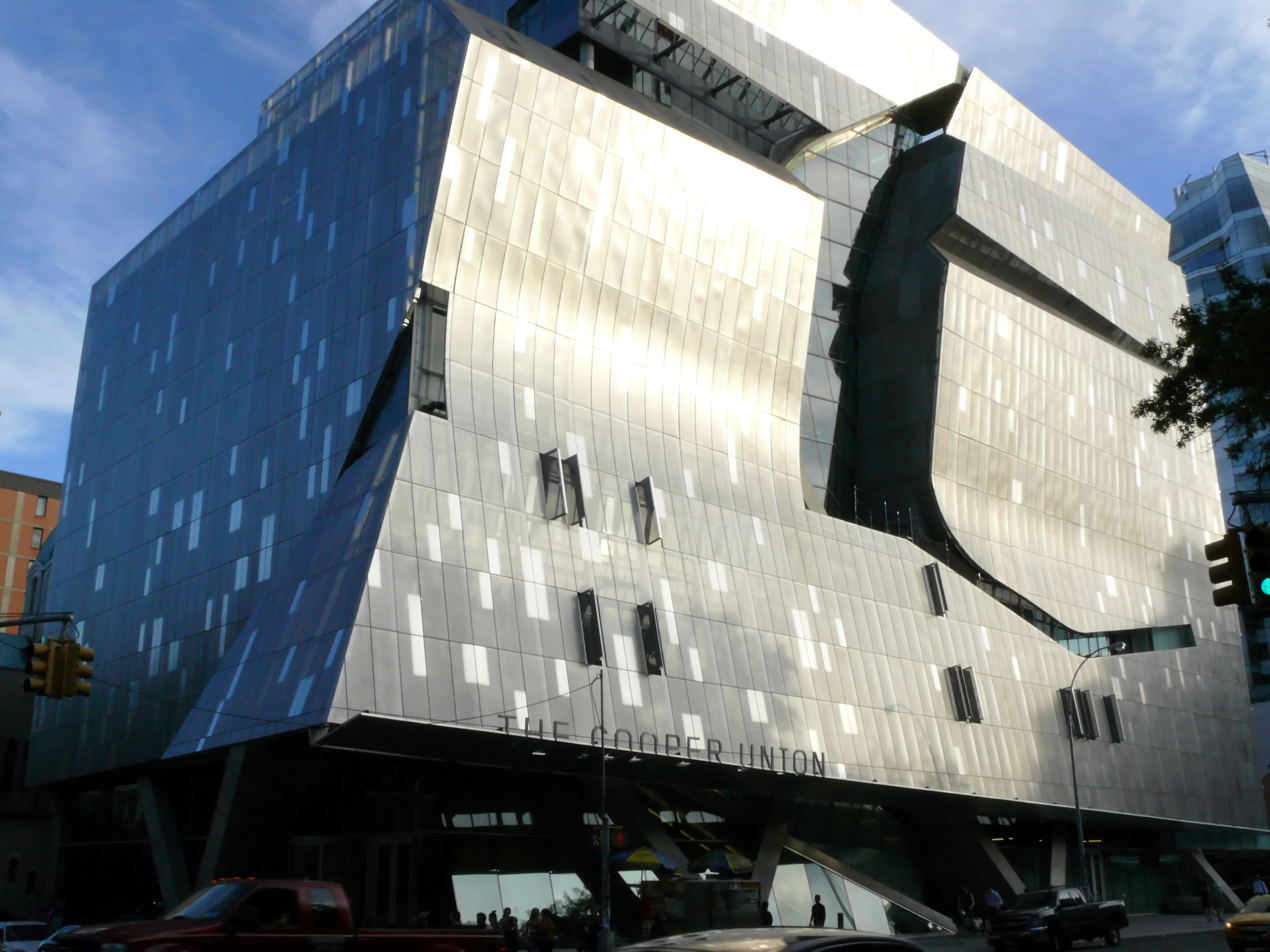
41 Cooper Square (2009)

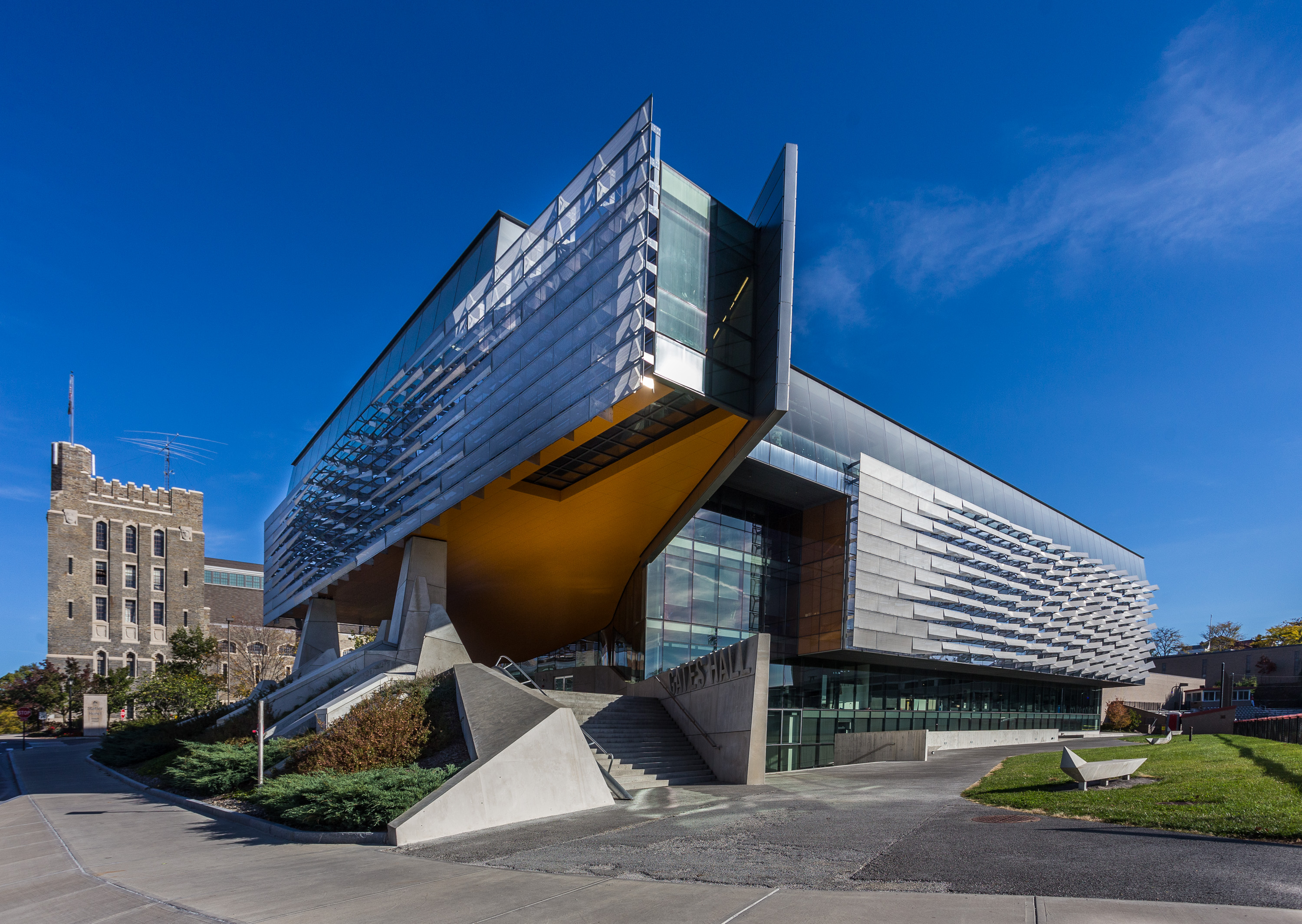
Bill & Melinda Gates Hall at Cornell University (2014)

== Career ==
=== Morphosis ===
Mayne and some others founded Morphosis Architects in 1972; Michael Rotondi joined in 1975. The firm's design philosophy arises from an interest in producing work with a meaning that can be understood by absorbing the culture for which it was made, and their goal was to develop an architecture that would eschew the normal bounds of traditional forms. Beginning as an informal collaboration of designers that survived on non-architectural projects, its first official commission was a school in Pasadena, attended by Mayne's son. Publicity from this project led to a number of residential commissions, including the Lawrence Residence. Mayne describes the early days of the group as more of a "garage band" than a practice. They spent their free time experimenting with new inventions for their clients, whom consisted of friends and parents of students.

When work was at a standstill, Mayne took a year off to earn his Master of Architecture degree from Harvard University. He graduated in 1978 and returned to work for Morphosis where he became the principal architect, lead designer and principal in charge for all of Morphosis' projects. The firm has grown into prominent design practice, with completed projects worldwide. Under the Design Excellence program of the United States government's General Service Administration, Thom Mayne has become a primary architect for federal projects. Recent commissions include: graduate housing at the University of Toronto; the San Francisco Federal Building; the University of Cincinnati Student Recreation Center; the Science Center School in Los Angeles, Diamond Ranch High School in Pomona, California; and the Wayne L. Morse United States Courthouse in Eugene, Oregon.

The work of Morphosis has a layered quality. Visually, the firm's architecture includes sculptural forms. In recent years, such visual effect has been made possible increasingly through computer design techniques, which simplify the construction of complex forms.

== Controversy ==
Early in his career, Mayne became notorious for having an abusive temper, and screaming at clients. "None of my clients would recommend me," he later admitted.

In late summer 2002, Mayne was asked by New York magazine to contribute a proposal for the World Trade Center site, where recovery and cleanup had just ended. In discussing his plan, Mayne told an interviewer his thoughts about the September 11 attacks. "I have no empathy; it doesn't make me weep. I could make a better case for justifying the terror than the other way around."

== Academics ==
Mayne taught at the University of Pennsylvania and has held teaching positions at many institutions including Columbia University, Harvard University, Yale University, the Berlage Institute in the Netherlands and the Bartlett School of Architecture in London. He was a tenured faculty member at the UCLA School of Arts and Architecture. In 2013, he contributed a foreword to the book "Never Built Los Angeles" by Sam Lubell and Greg Goldin. Now he is a faculty member at SCI-Arc and UPenn.

== Major projects ==
=== Completed ===
- Kate Mantilini / Beverly Hills, CA, 1986
- 6th Street Residence, Santa Monica, CA, 1988
- Cedar Sinai Comprehensive Cancer Center, Los Angeles, CA, 1988
- Crawford Residence, Montecito, CA, 1990
- Salick Healthcare Office Building, Los Angeles, CA, 1991
- Blades Residence, Santa Barbara, California, 1995
- Sun Tower in Seoul, Korea 1997
- Diamond Ranch High School, Pomona, California, 1999
- University of Toronto Graduate House, Toronto, Ontario, Canada, 2000
- Hypo Alpe-Adria Center, Klagenfurt, Austria, 2002
- Caltrans District 7 Headquarters, Los Angeles, California, 2004
- Science Center School, Los Angeles, California, 2004
- University of Cincinnati Student Recreation Center, Cincinnati, Ohio, 2006
- Public housing in Madrid, Spain, 2006
- Wayne L. Morse United States Courthouse, Eugene, Oregon, 2006
- San Francisco Federal Building, San Francisco, California, 2006
- Cahill Center for Astronomy and Astrophysics at the California Institute of Technology, Pasadena, California, 2009
- National Oceanic Atmospheric Administration (NOAA) Satellite Operation Facility, Suitland, Maryland, 2007
- New Academic Building at 41 Cooper Square, The Cooper Union for the Advancement of Science and Art, New York City, New York, 2009
- Perot Museum of Nature & Science, Dallas, Texas, 2012
- Bill and Melinda Gates Hall, Cornell University, Ithaca, New York, 2013
- Emerson College Los Angeles Center, Los Angeles, California, 2014
- Vialia Vigo, Vigo, Galicia, Spain, 2018
- Casablanca Finance City Tower, Casablanca, Morocco, 2019
- Orange County Museum of Art, Costa Mesa, California, 2022

=== In progress ===
- Cornell NYC Tech, Roosevelt Island, New York, 2017
- A. Alfred Taubman Engineering, Architecture and Life Sciences Complex, Lawrence Technological University, Southfield, Michigan (2016)

== Awards and honors ==
Mayne has been the recipient of many distinguished awards over the course of his career. Among them are the Rome Prize which he was awarded in 1987 and the Pritzker Prize in 2005. Mayne was a member of the Holcim Awards global jury in 2006 and a member of the Holcim Awards jury for region North America in 2005. In 2009, he was appointed as a member of the President's Committee on the Arts and the Humanities. He was elected to the board of trustees of SCI-Arc in 2011. In 2015, Mayne was a member of the Prix Versailles judges panel.

List of awards and honors

- Rome Prize, American Academy in Rome, Italy / 1987
- Eliel Saarinen Chair, Yale School of Architecture, Yale University / 1991
- Brunner Prize or Award in Architecture, American Academy of Arts and Letters / 1992
- Los Angeles Gold Medal, American Institute of Architects / 2000
- Chrysler Design Award of Excellence / 2001
- Pritzker Prize / 2005
- Top Ten Green Project Award, American Institute of Architects Committee on the Environment / 2007
- The Edward MacDowell Medal / 2008
- Neutra Medal for Professional Excellence / 2011
- American Institute of Architects Gold Medal / 2013

== Ray Bradbury house ==
In June 2014, Mayne bought the Cheviot Hills, Los Angeles house that noted writer Ray Bradbury had lived in for 50 years. In January 2015, the building was scheduled for demolition which caused a media controversy. According to Mayne, who had not known about the fact that it belonged to Bradbury, the Bradbury family – which has not commented on the situation – had no interest in preserving the house. Mayne further explained that he had bought the house from a foundation that was not associated with the Bradbury estate. A city demolition permit was issued on December 30, 2014 with demolition to take place in January 2015. Materials from Bradbury's home office were donated to the Indiana-based Center for Ray Bradbury studies, which intended to raise money to recreate it as it was in the mid-1960s. When queried, the Morphosis office reported that the house was not being razed, but "deconstructed" so that some of the materials could be recycled – including into 451 sets of bookends – a longer and more complicated process. It was reported at the time that a contractor said that the house Mayne intended to build would have three underground levels, including a swimming pool and two stories above ground – although Mayne himself said that plans for the house were not finished. "Our house will not be ordinary – our house is going to be a garden", and expected it to be a "prototype that is landscape-neutral and water friendly". The new house was supposed to embody the new ecological and sustainable standard for architecture in Los Angeles, according to Mayne. He further stated that a memorial wall to Bradbury and his works was planned to be part of the project. Construction on the new house was scheduled to finish in 2017.
