= Syska Hennessy =

American engineering company

Syska Hennessy Group
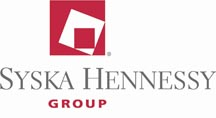
- Industry: Consulting, Engineering, Commissioning
- Founded: 1927
- Headquarters: 1185 Avenue of the Americas, New York, NY
- Number of locations: New York, Los Angeles, Atlanta, Dubai,(UAE), Boston, Charlotte, Chicago, Dallas, Jacksonville, Hamilton/NJ, Orange County, Richmond, Sacramento, San Diego, San Francisco, Silicon Valley, Washington D.C., Shanghai,(PRC), Singapore, Saudi Arabia
- Products: Aquariums, Aviation, Convention Centers, Corporate/Commercial, Critical Facilities/ Data Centers, Entertainment & Broadcast, Government, Healthcare, Higher Education, Libraries, Life Sciences Museums & Public Assembly, Real Estate/Office Interiors, Sports Venues, Workplace Interiors
- Services: Core Services of Mechanical, Electrical, Plumbing/Fire Protection Engineering. Specialist Services include Architectural Lighting Design, Audio-Visual, Building Science & Technologies, Commissioning, Energy Services, Facilities Management, IT/Telecommunications, Medical Communications, Security, Vertical Transportation
- Number of employees: 450+
- Parent: SH Group
- Divisions: Syska Hennessy Group, Syska Hennessy Group China, Syska Hennessy Group, MENA (Middle East North Africa)
- Website: www.syska.com

Syska Hennessy is a global consulting, engineering and commissioning firm for the built environment. Established in 1928, Syska Hennessy was ranked the 161st-largest U.S. design firm by Engineering-News Record in 2022. The firm has over 500 employees with 20 offices worldwide, including 18 U.S. locations as well as Shanghai, China, and Dubai, UAE. Consulting-Specifying Engineer magazine placed Syska Hennessy 19th overall in its 2022 MEP Giants list, with gross revenue over $110 million. More than 90% of its revenue is derived from mechanical, electrical, and plumbing engineering services, according to the CSE ranking report, Building Design + Construction magazine ranked Syska Hennessy15th in its 2022 list of top building engineering firms.

== History ==
Syska Hennessy was founded in 1928, by two mechanical engineers, Adolph G. Syska and John F. Hennessy. Originally established in New York City as Syska & Hennessy Engineers, the firm was among the earliest to specialize in the mechanical and electrical systems at the heart of high-rise structures.

1930s

- US Post Office Building, Washington, DC
- Frick Collection, New York
- LaGuardia Airport, New York
- 1939 World’s Fair, New York

1940s

- United Nations Headquarters, New York
- Todd Shipyards, New York, New Jersey, Louisiana, Maine

1950s

- West Point, New York
- US Air Force Academy, Colorado
- Columbia University, New York
- New York University Medical School, New York
- Massachusetts Institute of Technology, Massachusetts

1960s

- Lincoln Center, New York
- Rockefeller Center, New York
- John F. Kennedy Center for the Performing Arts, Washington, DC
- National Gallery of Art, Washington, DC
- Madison Square Gardens, New York
- JFK Airport, New York
- Bureau of Engraving and Printing, Washington, DC
- New Jersey College of Medicine
- Procter & Gamble Headquarters - Cincinnati, Ohio
- Mount Sinai Hospital - Annemberg Tower, Manhattan, New York
- New York University, New York

1970s

- National University of Iran, Tehran
- King Saud University, Saudi Arabia
- Monterey Bay Aquarium, California
- IBM, Bordeaux, France

1980s

- Harvard University, Massachusetts
- Boston Museum of Fine Arts, Massachusetts
- New York City Convention Center, New York
- Los Angeles International Airport, California
- Disney World, Florida

1990s

- Amgen*Bristol-Myers Squibb
- Bank of America, Nationwide
- Sony Pictures Studios, California
- Paramount Pictures, California
- Reagan National Airport, Washington, DC

== Notable projects ==
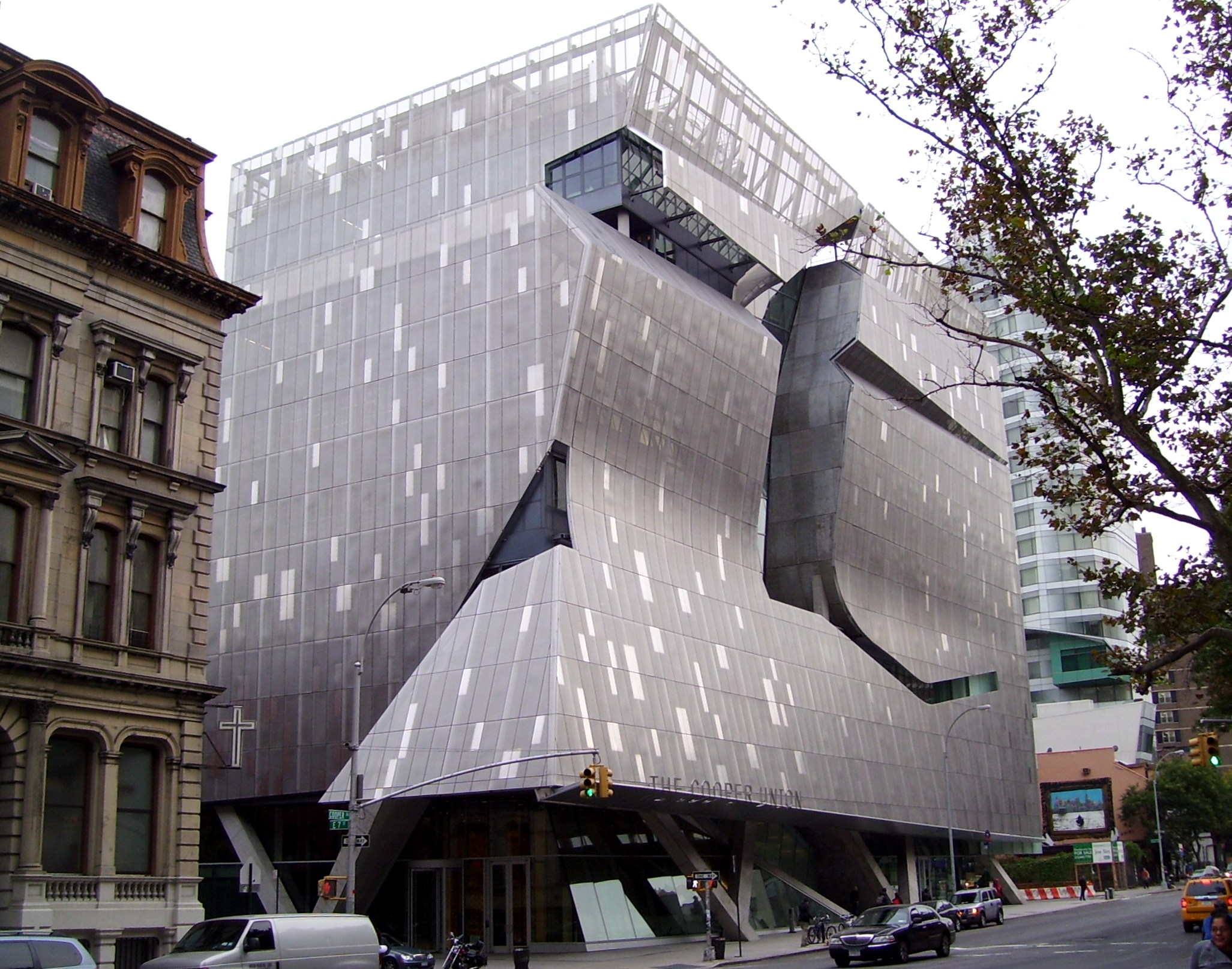
Cooper Union's 41 Cooper Square

- Cooper Union Academic Center
- U.S. Environmental Protection Agency Region 8 Headquarters
- Maricopa County - New High-Rise Court Tower
- 2000 Avenue of the Stars
- Nokia Corporate Headquarters
- Red Bull Headquarters
- New York Presbyterian, Milstein Heart Hospital
- Dulles International Airport Automated People Movers; East Z-Gates Concourse
- Chennai International Airport
- Haeundae Udong Hyundai I'Park Development
- King Saud University
- Dubai International Airport

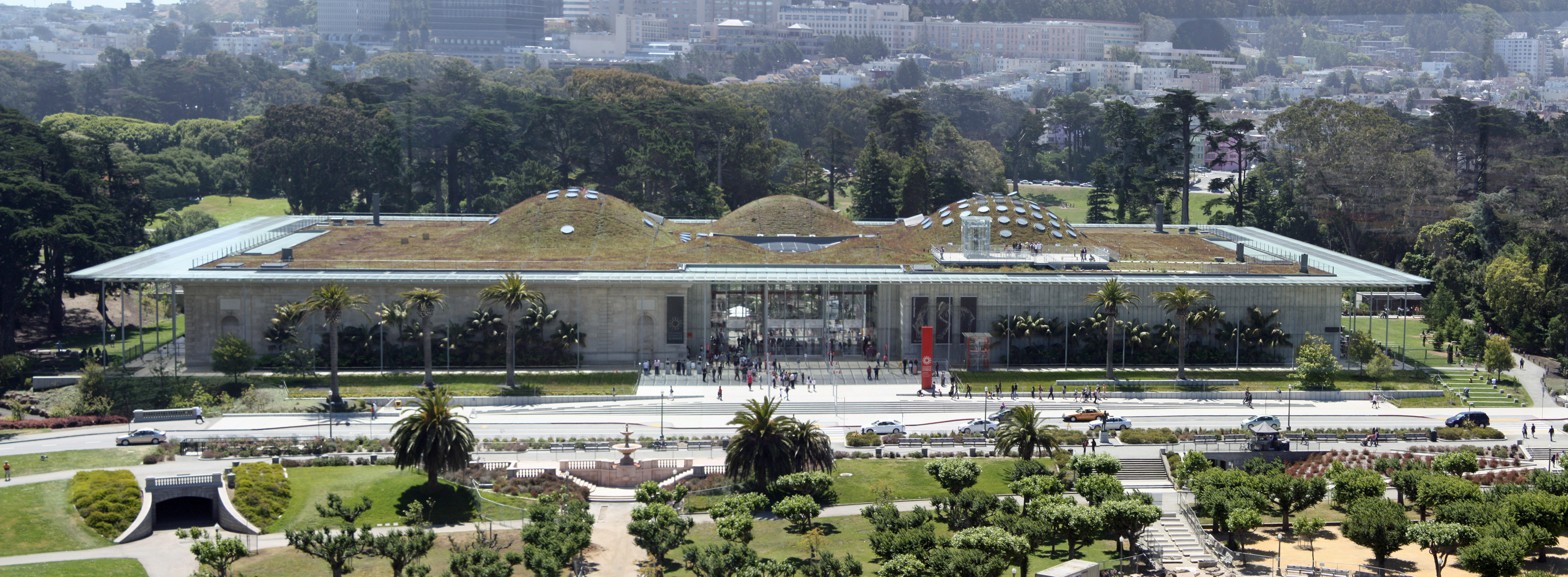
California Academy of Sciences

- California Academy of Sciences
- Indianapolis International Airport, Midfield Terminal
- KAPSARC
- Busan Lotte World Tower
- Lotte Jamsil
