= Graduate House (University of Toronto) =

Student residence at the University of Toronto St. George

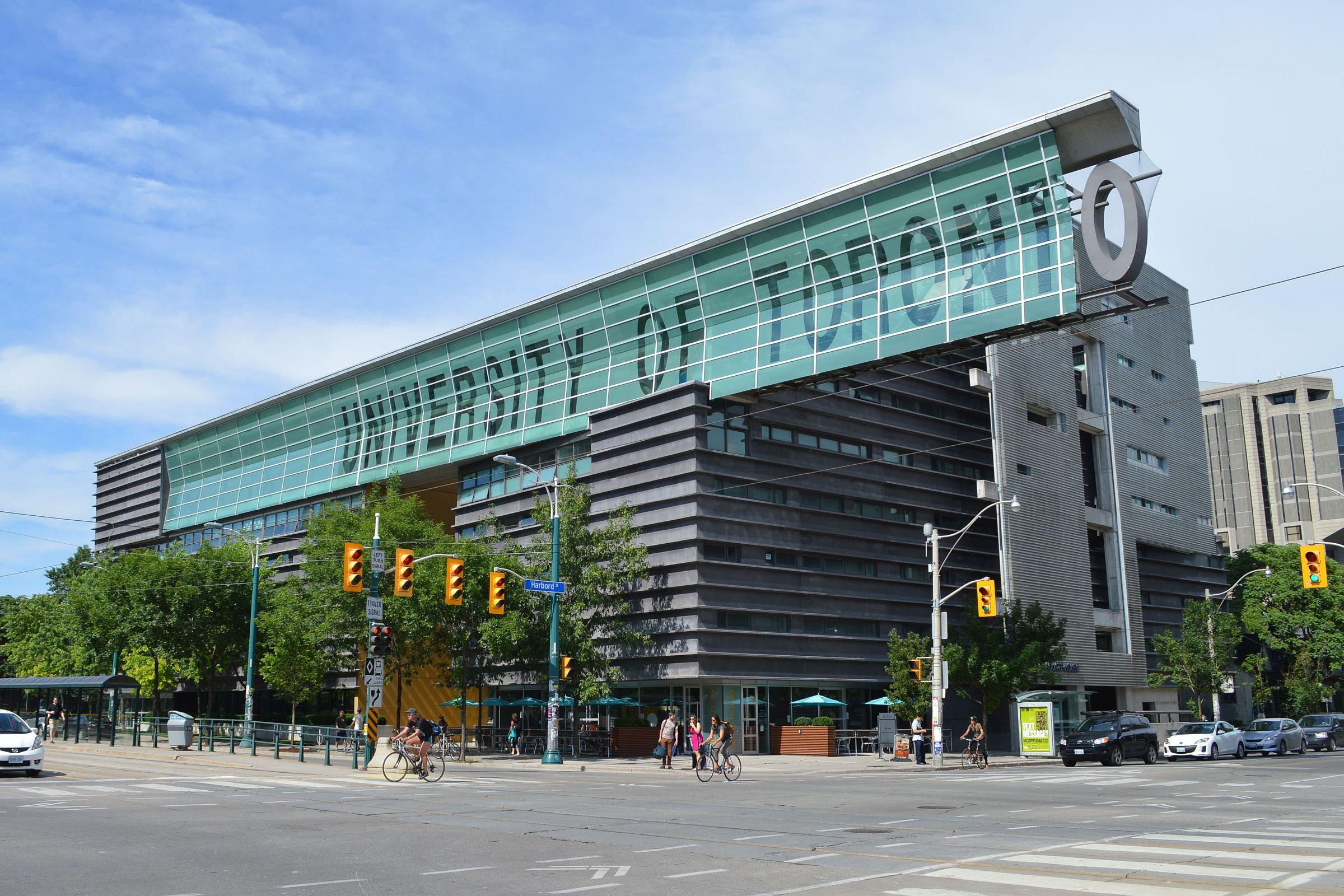
- The residence in 2013
- Interactive map of the Graduate House area

General information
- Location: 60 Harbord Street, Toronto, Ontario, Canada
- Coordinates: 43°39′48.5″N 79°24′06.5″W
- Opening: 2000
- Owner: University of Toronto

Other information
- Public transit: at Spadina; 510

Graduate House at the University of Toronto is a student residence specifically for graduate students, designed by Thom Mayne of Morphosis Architects in Los Angeles together with Toronto's Teeple Architects. It is located on the western edge of the St. George campus at 60 Harbord Street, Toronto, Ontario, Canada.

== History ==
Before 2000, the Graduate Student Residence was a building at 321 Bloor St W, known as the St. George Apartments. The four-storey U-shaped residence, built in 1926, was designed by the firm of Paisley & Marani. On August 18, 1976, the building was added into the City of Toronto's Inventory of Heritage Properties. In 2001, the university began the process to redevelop the site to accommodate the Woodsworth College residence.

The new Graduate House opened in 2000 and accommodates 435 students.

== Building ==
Located on the western edge of the St. George campus, on the north-east corner of Spadina Avenue and Harbord Street, the residence marks the main western entrance to the campus with a long structure extending halfway over Harbord Street featuring a massive "University of Toronto" sign. The building is considered one of the more important works of architect Thom Mayne, who won the Pritzker Prize in 2005. The building won a number of awards, but its design was not without controversy with a number of students and area residents criticizing its unusual façade and concrete interior.

Graduate House contains two to five bedroom apartment-style suites for full-time Graduate and Second-Entry Professional Faculty single students. The residence also contains various amenities including underground parking, bike storage, a laundry room, a reading room, and a common room.

== See also ==
- List of University of Toronto buildings
- Massey College, Toronto
- University of Toronto School of Graduate Studies
