= Caltrans District 7 Headquarters =

Building in Los Angeles, United States

Coordinates: 34.0514°N 118.2439°W

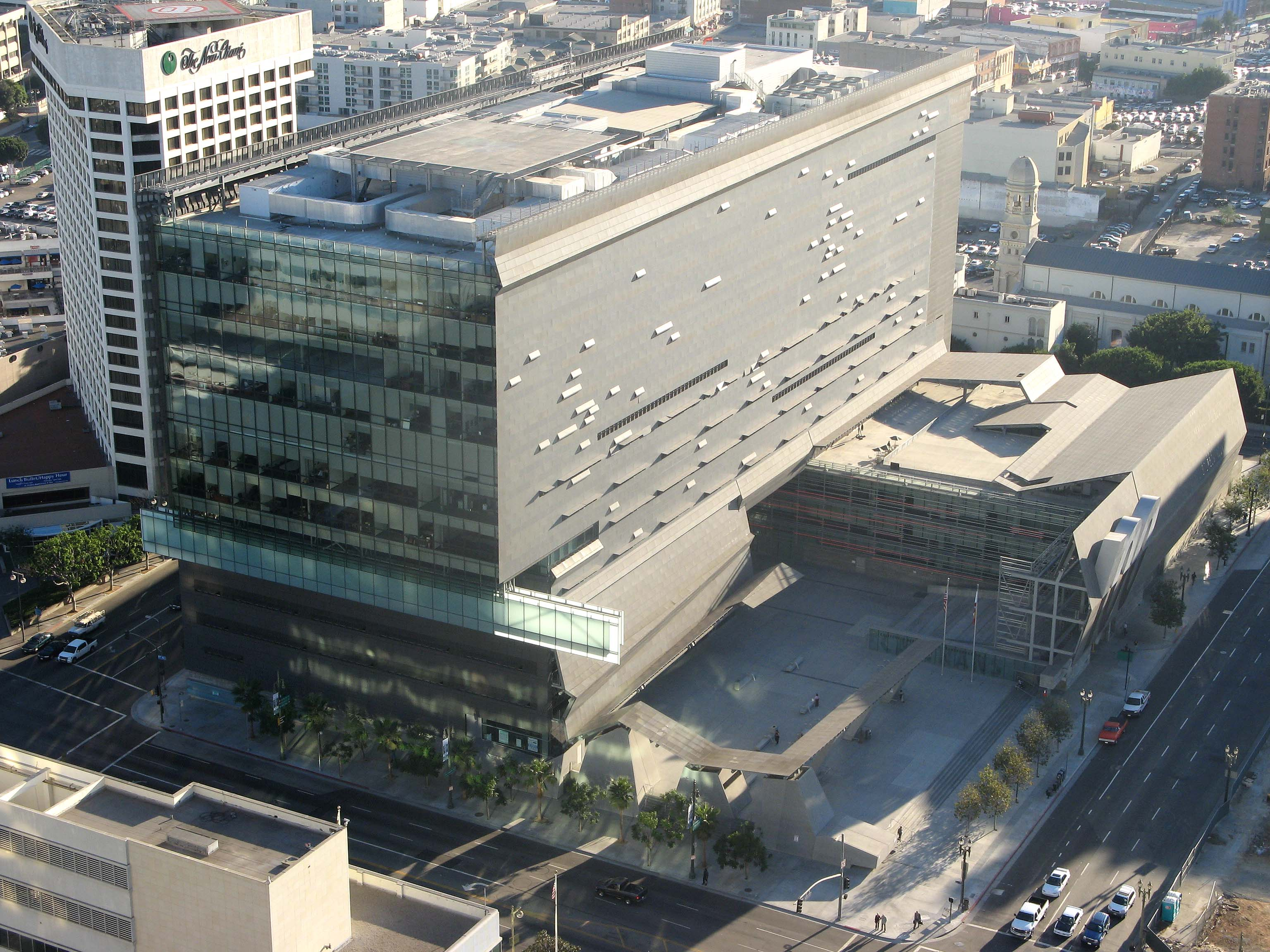
Birds-eye view of the building designed by Thom Mayne (2004)

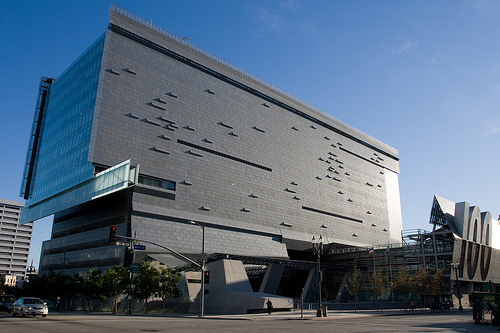
Caltrans District 7 Headquarters

The Caltrans District 7 Headquarters building at 100 South Main Street in Downtown Los Angeles, California, United States serves the California Department of Transportation (Caltrans) and the Los Angeles Department of Transportation. Built on a $165 million budget, it opened on September 24, 2004. Its futuristic and environmentally friendly design won its designer, Thom Mayne, the 2005 Pritzker Prize. The design and construction of the building was documented across four episodes on the History Channel series Modern Marvels, to demonstrate the unique challenges presented in the design and construction of large buildings over the past two centuries.

The 13-story structure, bounded by First Street, Main Street, Second Street and Los Angeles Street, has 716,200 gross square feet for office spaces and an underground parking for 1142 vehicles. Special features include the public plaza named for Eli and Edythe Broad, Motordom (a large four story light installation), the unique glass floor of the third-floor conference room, Code: Survey (168 one-foot-square glass art panels), urban landmarks (4-story high “100” house number and the light-bar cantilevers out of the building), and the Ten Past Five O’clock on the fourth floor.

== In popular culture ==
The building has been featured in films including The Island, Mr. & Mrs. Smith (both 2005), No Strings Attached (2011), several episodes of the show Alias (2001-2006) and Maroon 5's music video 'Makes Me Wonder' (2007).
