= Ukrainian Village, Manhattan =

Neighborhood in New York City

Ukrainian Village
- Neighborhood in Manhattan
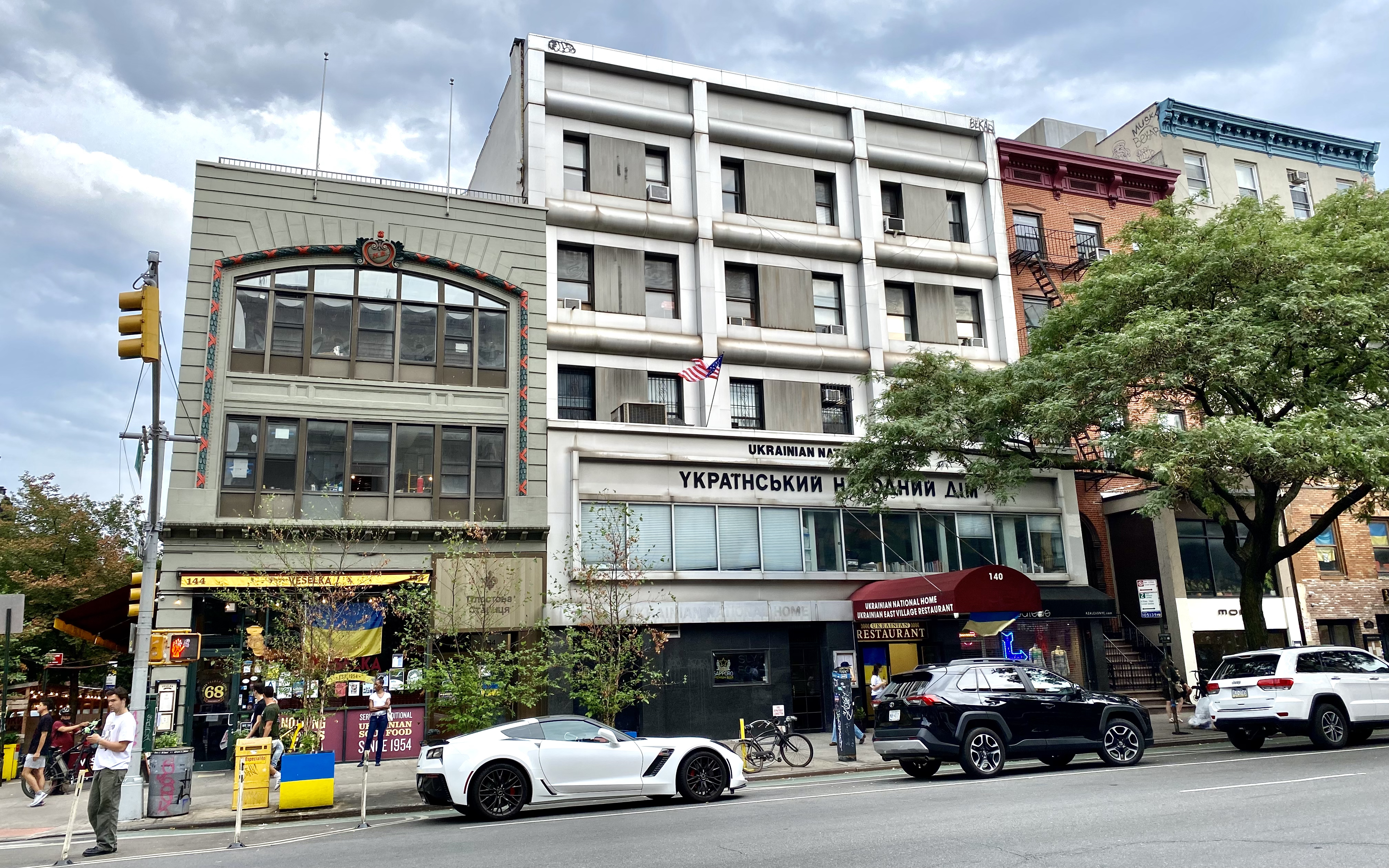
- The Ukrainian National Home and Ukrainian Village Restaurant

- Location in New York City
- Coordinates: 40.7267°N 73.9842°W
- Country: United States
- State: New York
- City: New York City
- Borough: Manhattan
- Community District: Manhattan 3

Ukrainian Village (also known as Little Ukraine or the Ukrainian East Village) is a Ukrainian-American ethnic enclave in the East Village neighborhood of Manhattan, New York City. Centered around East 7th Street between Second Avenue and Avenue A, the neighborhood has been a center for Ukrainian Americans in New York City since the late 19th century.

Ukrainian immigration to the area began in the 1870s, with the first Ukrainian Catholic church established in 1905. The neighborhood experienced its most significant growth following World War II, when approximately 60,000 displaced persons and refugees settled in the area, establishing numerous cultural institutions, churches, schools, and businesses. At its peak, Ukrainian Village was one of the most vibrant Ukrainian communities outside of Ukraine itself.

Since the 1990s the neighborhood has experienced significant gentrification, leading to the closure of many historic Ukrainian businesses and the dispersal of much of the residential Ukrainian population to other parts of New York City. Ukrainian Village contains the St. George Ukrainian Catholic Church, the Ukrainian Museum, and the Shevchenko Scientific Society. In 2019 about one-third of New York City's approximately 80,000 Ukrainian Americans maintained connections to the neighborhood.

== History ==
=== Early settlement (1880s–1940s) ===
Ukrainian immigration to the East Village began in the 1870s and intensified in the 1880s, with early settlers primarily arriving from the Austro-Hungarian province of Galicia (present-day western Ukraine). These immigrants established their community in what was then known as the Lower East Side, alongside other Eastern European immigrant groups including Poles, Jews, and Russians.

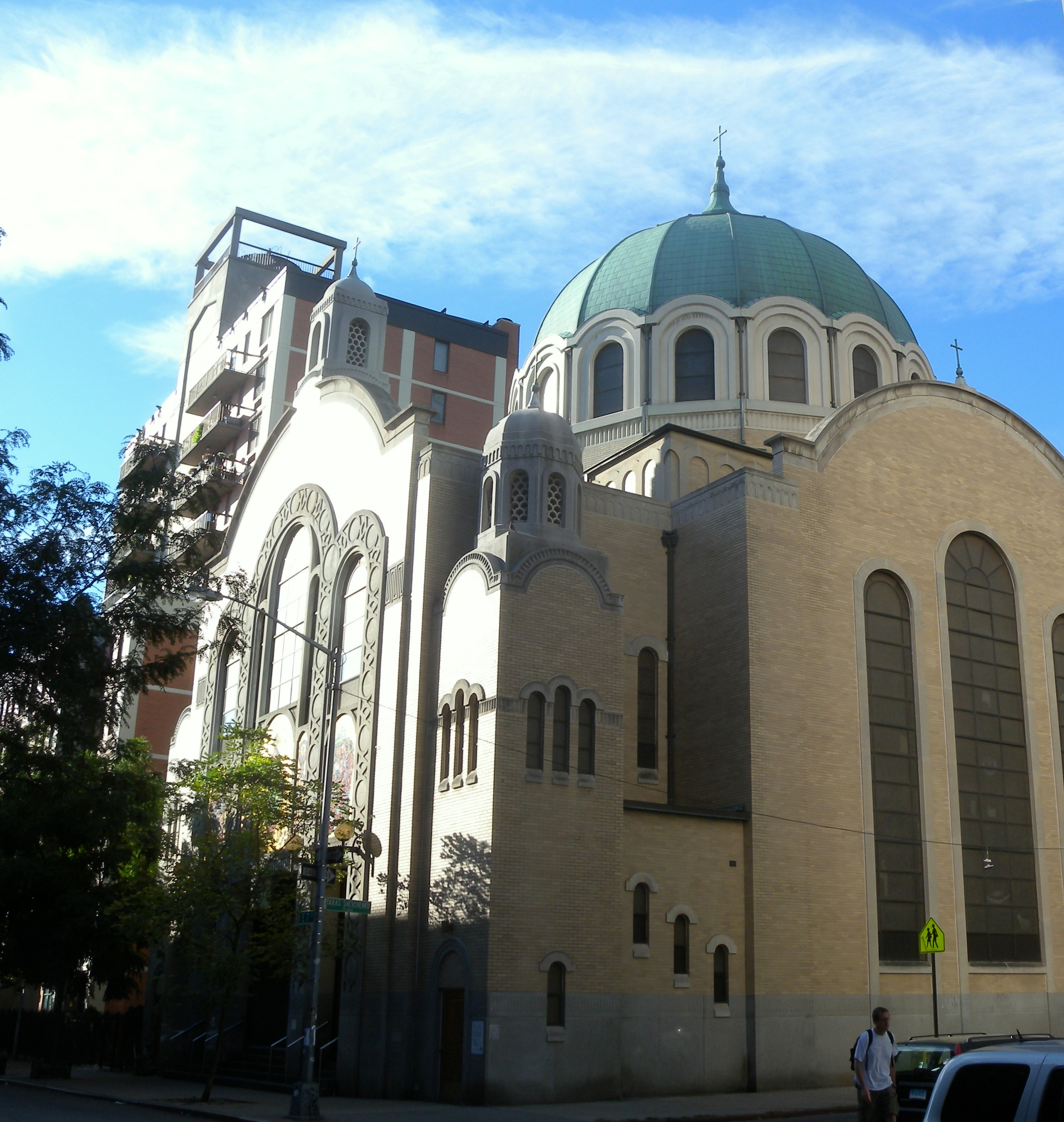
St. George Ukrainian Catholic Church

The first Ukrainian Catholic church in New York City, St. George Ukrainian Catholic Church, was established in 1905 at 30 East 7th Street. The current Byzantine-style church building was designed by architect Apollinaire Osadca and constructed in 1977–1978, replacing the original structure and becoming a distinctive landmark in the neighborhood.

=== Post-World War II development (1945–1980s) ===
The neighborhood experienced its most significant growth following World War II with the arrival of approximately 60,000 persons and political refugees fleeing Soviet rule. This wave of immigration brought artists, intellectuals, and political activists who established numerous cultural institutions. Many of them settled in New York City, which became one of the largest centers for the development of Ukrainian art outside of Ukraine. In the early 1950s, Ukrainians established a number of artistic institutions and centers, creative teams, and scholarly organizations which led the way in the development of an intensive national, cultural, and artistic process. In the early 1950s, Ukrainians established a number of artistic institutions and centers, creative teams, and scholarly organizations which led the way in the development of an intensive national, cultural, and artistic process.

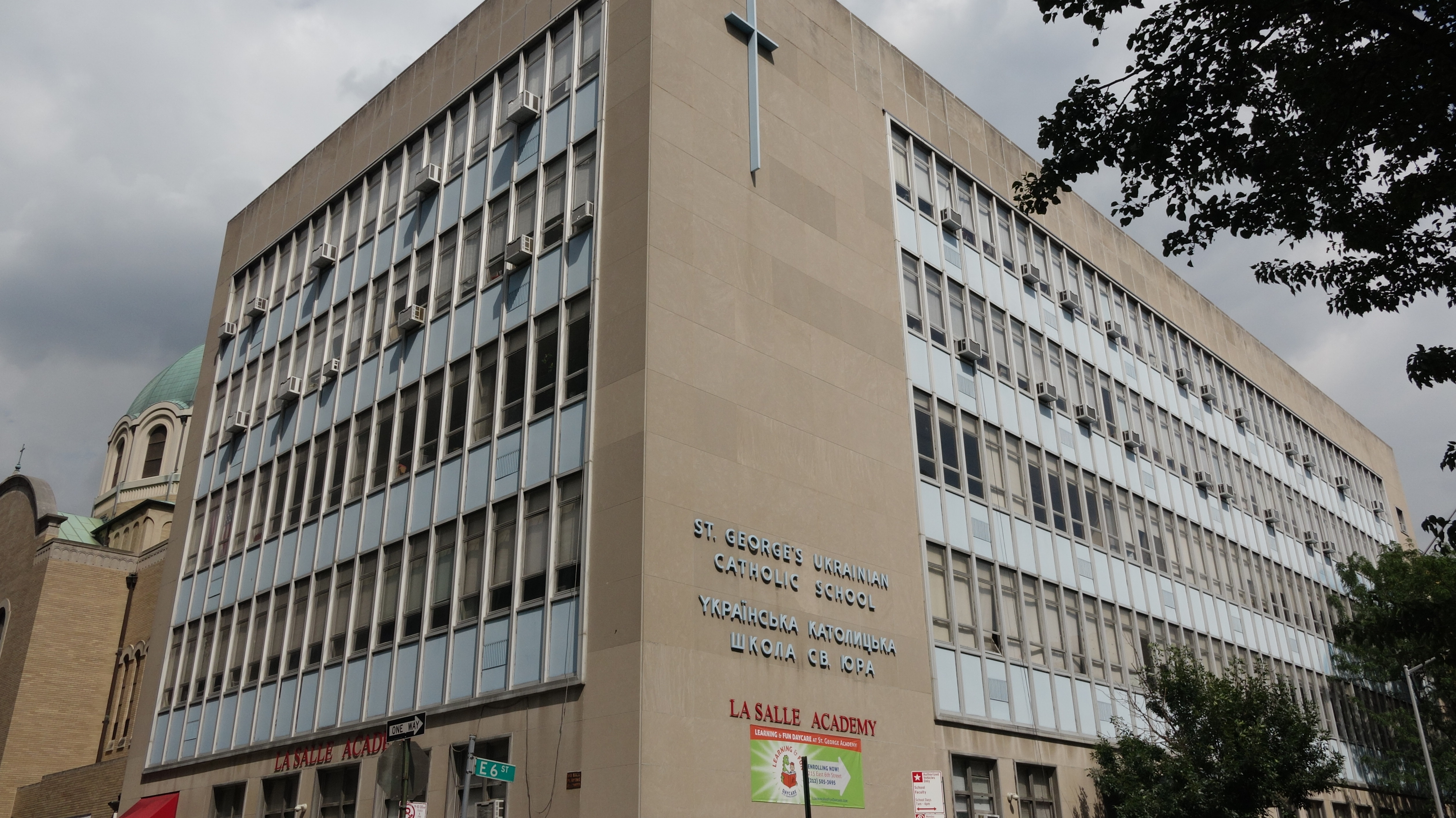
St. George's Ukrainian Catholic School

In 1955, St. George Academy, a Ukrainian Catholic elementary and high school, was founded adjacent to the church. The Ukrainian National Home, located at 140 Second Avenue, became a central gathering place for the community, hosting cultural events, dances, and meetings of Ukrainian organizations. During this period, Ukrainian Village developed a commercial infrastructure of Ukrainian restaurants, bookstores, travel agencies, and specialty shops. Notable establishments included the Surma Book and Music Store founded by Myron Surmach Sr., which sold Ukrainian books, music, and crafts, and became a cultural landmark in the neighborhood before closing in 2016. The store became popular during the 1960s, attracting customers including musicians Jim Morrison, Jimmy Page, and Mama Cass. In 1978, the one-way, one-block-long street running between East 6th and 7th streets adjacent to St. George Ukrainian Catholic Church was renamed Taras Shevchenko Place in honor of the Ukrainian national poet, artist, and humanist.

=== Gentrification and transformation (1990s–present) ===
Beginning in the 1990s, Ukrainian Village experienced significant demographic and economic changes as gentrification spread through the East Village. Rising rents led to the closure of many long-established Ukrainian businesses and the dispersal of the residential Ukrainian population to other parts of New York City and surrounding suburbs, particularly in Brooklyn (including Williamsburg, South Brooklyn, and Greenpoint) and Queens (particularly Astoria). The neighborhood has suffered in recent decades due to escalating rent prices, which affect not only residents but also which businesses can continue to serve the community. The Kurowycky Meat Products butcher shop, operated by the same family since 1954, closed in 2007. The historic Surma bookstore closed in 2016 after nearly a century in operation. Other closures included Ukrainian restaurants Leshko's (closed 2000s), Odessa Restaurant (closed 2013), and Kiev Restaurant (closed 2000). The 2nd Avenue Deli, founded by Ukrainian Jewish immigrant Abe Lebewohl, closed its original location in 2006 due to rent increases and reopened at a new location outside the neighborhood. Despite these closures, Ukrainian Village remains an important center for Ukrainian cultural life in New York City.

According to United States census data, the percentage of residents of Ukrainian ancestry in census tract 38 (covering much of the historic Ukrainian Village area) declined from approximately 7.9% in 1990 to 4.8% in 2010, and further to approximately 2% by 2017. The overall European-born population in the East Village has similarly decreased, with the majority of remaining European immigrants having arrived before 2000.

== Cultural institutions ==
Ukrainian Village maintains several important cultural institutions that continue to serve as a social, civic, and spiritual center for the Ukrainian American community.

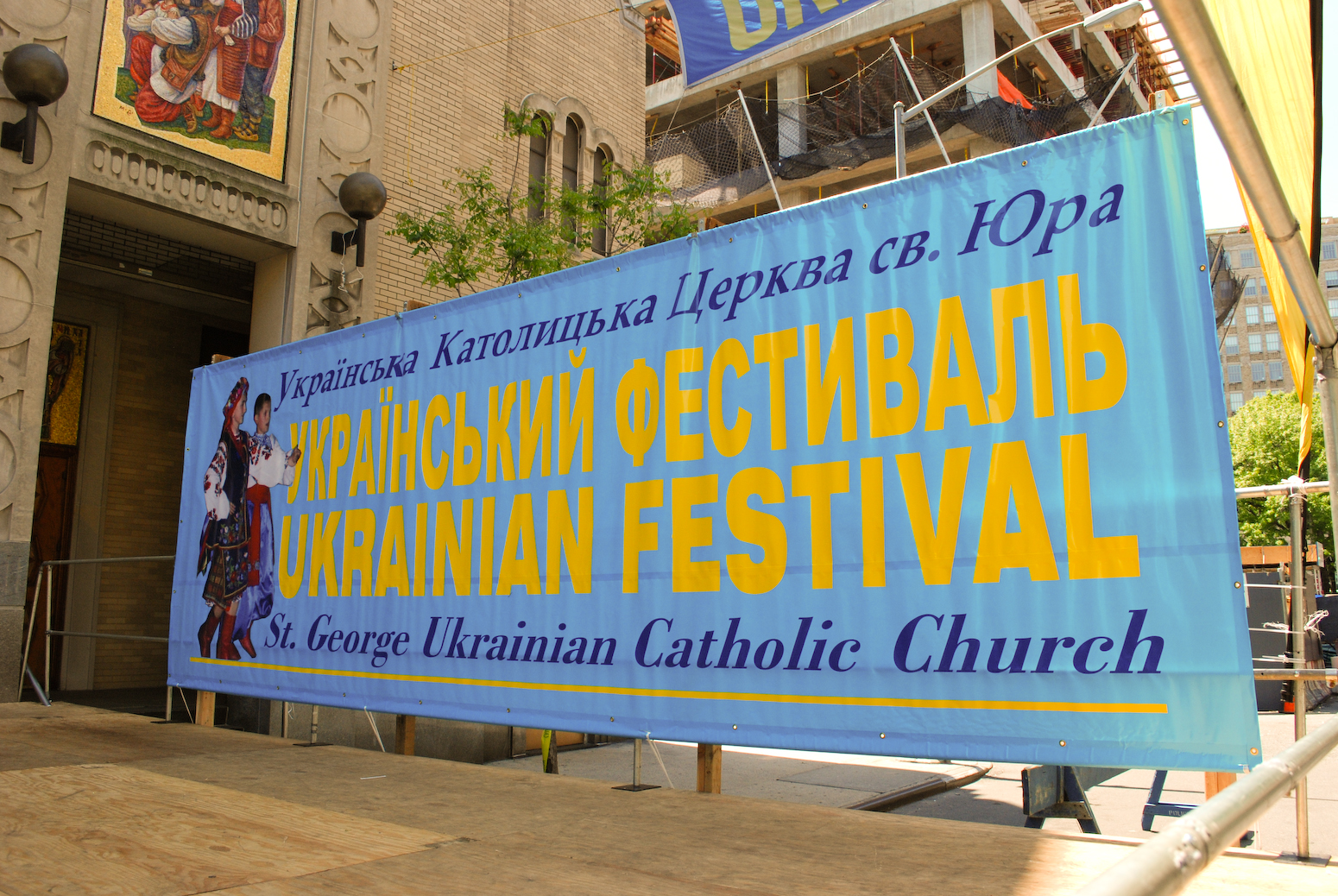
Ukrainian Festival sign in May 2008

St. George Ukrainian Catholic Church is the enclave's oldest Ukrainian institution, serving as both a place of worship and community center. The church operates St. George Academy and has held an annual Ukrainian Heritage Festival every May since 1976 on East 7th Street between Second and Third Avenues.

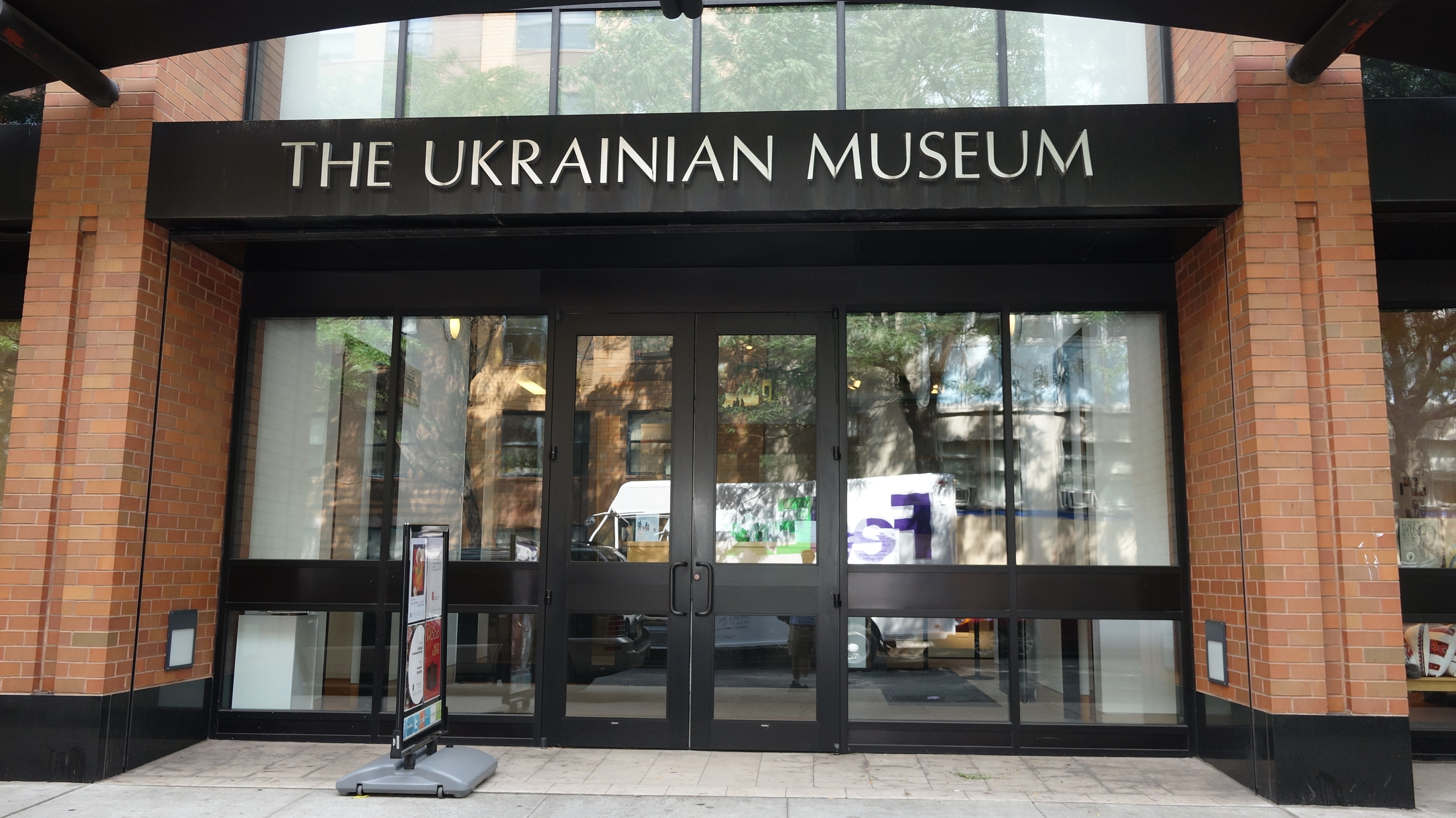
Entrance to The Ukrainian Museum

The Ukrainian Museum, located at 222 East 6th Street and founded in 1976 by the Ukrainian National Women's League of America, relocated to a new building in 2005 designed by Ukrainian American architect George Sawicki. The museum houses collections of folk art, fine art by Ukrainian and Ukrainian American artists such as Alexander Archipenko, Jacques Hnizdovsky, Yaroslava Surmach Mills, and Kazimir Malevich, and archival materials documenting Ukrainian immigration. The Shevchenko Scientific Society maintains its headquarters in the neighborhood, promoting Ukrainian culture and research. The organization's archives include rare documentation of the Holodomor, including a stolen register of deaths from the city of Kamianske. During the Soviet era, members smuggled Ukrainian-language books into Ukraine.

The Self Reliance Association of Ukrainian Americans, located at 98 Second Avenue, has served the community since 1947, sponsoring the Ukrainian National Federal Credit Union (established 1951), operating the Saturday Ukrainian Heritage School, and running a senior club. The Ukrainian Congress Committee of America (UCCA) maintains its national headquarters in Ukrainian Village. The Ukrainian National Home at 140 Second Avenue hosts Ukrainian cultural events and houses the Ukrainian East Village Restaurant. The building was originally the Ukrainian Labor Home with 5,000 members that published the Ukrainian Daily News. Plast, a Ukrainian Scouting organization founded in 1911, established a presence in the neighborhood serving Ukrainian American youth through cultural and educational programs held in Ukrainian.

Veselka, a 24-hour Ukrainian diner operating since 1954, has become a neighborhood institution. East Village Meat Market (Baczynsky's), founded in 1970, specializes in Eastern European meats and sausages. Other establishments include the Ukrainian East Village Restaurant and Streecha Ukrainian Kitchen. KGB Bar, occupying the former Ukrainian Labor Home building, was transformed in 1993 into a literary venue that became one of New York's most prominent reading series, hosting authors including David Foster Wallace, Jonathan Franzen, and Jonathan Safran Foer.

== Cultural significance ==
Ukrainian Village developed as a deliberate effort by post-World War II refugees to preserve Ukrainian culture in exile. The concentration of Ukrainian restaurants and food establishments led to the area being nicknamed the "pierogi belt." Veselka, in particular, has gained recognition in American popular culture, appearing in films including Nick and Norah's Infinite Playlist and the television series Gossip Girl. Ukrainian Village's location in the East Village placed it at the intersection of immigrant and artistic cultures during the mid-20th century. The Ukrainian National Home building at 140 Second Avenue housed "The Dom," a nightclub where Andy Warhol staged "The Exploding Plastic Inevitable" multimedia events featuring The Velvet Underground in 1966. Many Ukrainian restaurants and bars became gathering places for artists, musicians, and writers of the East Village bohemian scene, contributing to the neighborhood's reputation as a center of artistic activity.

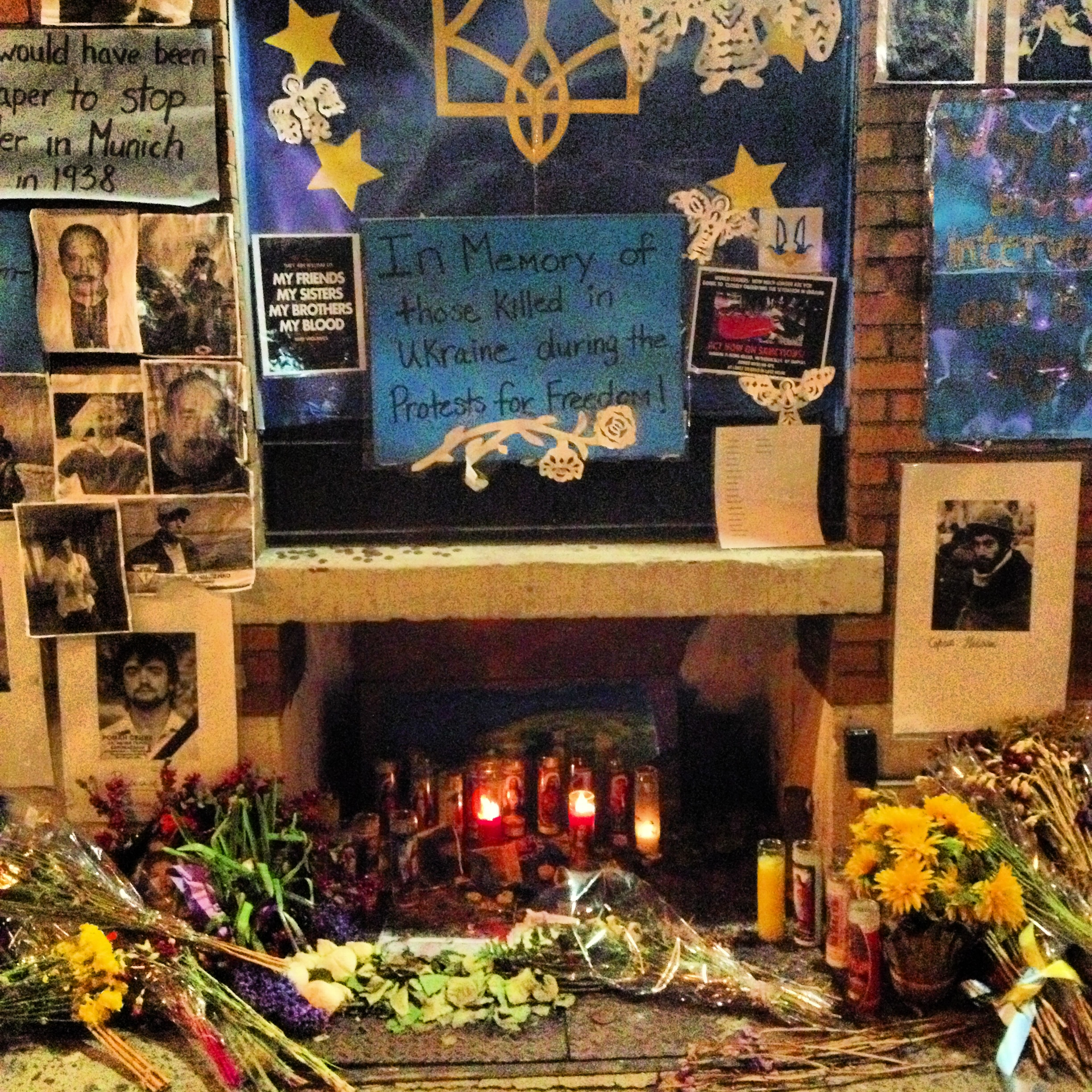
Memoriam for Ukrainians on Second Avenue near St. Mark's Place

=== Response to 2022 Russian invasion ===
Following Russia's 2022 invasion of Ukraine, Ukrainian Village became a focal point for solidarity demonstrations and fundraising efforts. Veselka owner Jason Birchard sponsored family members of Ukrainian employees fleeing the war through the Biden Administration's 'Uniting for Ukraine' program, and the restaurant raised over half a million dollars for the war effort. Ukrainian Americans and supporters built a shrine on Second Avenue and 9th Street incorporating photographs of victims, flowers, and candles. Ukrainian flags and blue-and-yellow decorations appeared throughout the neighborhood, and Ukrainian establishments served as gathering places for both Ukrainian Americans and supporters of Ukraine.

== See also ==
- Ukrainian Americans in New York City
- East Village, Manhattan
- Ukrainian Americans
- Ukrainian diaspora
