= Dacha (restaurant) =

Restaurant in Hong Kong

- Interactive map of Dacha

Restaurant information
- Established: 2015
- Chef: Oksana Shevchuk
- Food type: Ukrainian, Russian, Eastern European
- Dress code: Casual
- Location: Hollywood Road, Hong Kong
- Coordinates: 22.282216°N 114.153191°E
- Website: dacha.oddle.me

Dacha (Chinese: 鄉間別墅) was a Ukrainian and Eastern European restaurant and bar in Hong Kong.

It was founded by Olena Smith and Oksana Shevchuk, sisters from Ukraine, who came to Hong Kong in 2005. Having found the local supply of Eastern European food insufficient in Hong Kong, in 2012, the sisters started their own online store Xytorok for Russian-style produce. Apart from importing ingredients from Ukraine, they offered fresh sour cream, cheeses, cakes and pelmeni. In 2015, they expanded their business into opening Dacha, an Eastern European restaurant in Central, Hong Kong.

The menu of the restaurant includes such dishes as vegetarian borsht, chicken Kiev, herring under a fur coat, home-made kielbasa, cabbage rolls, blini with caviar, medovik made of buckwheat honey, etc. It also offers a variety of dumplings including Russian pelmeni, Polish pierogi and South Caucasian manti.

In 2020, Lifestyle Asia listed Dacha among the top 10 places to eat dumplings in Hong Kong.

== See also ==
- List of Ukrainian restaurants
- Veselka – a Ukrainian restaurant in New York.
