= Taras Bulba (disambiguation) =

Taras Bulba is an historical novel by Russian-Ukrainian writer Nikolai Gogol.

Taras Bulba may also refer to:

== People ==
- Taras Bulba-Borovets (1908–1981), Ukrainian World War II resistance fighter nicknamed Taras Bulba after the Gogol character
- Ion Croitoru (1963–2017), Canadian wrestler with ring name Taras Bulba

== Films ==
- Taras Bulba (1909 film), based on the Gogol novel
- Taras Bulba (1924 film), based on the Gogol novel
- Taras Bulba (1936 film), a 1936 French historical drama film
- Taras Bulba (1962 film), based on the Gogol novel
- Taras Bulba, the Cossack, a 1962 Italian film
- Taras Bulba (2009 film), based on the Gogol novel

== Music ==
- Taras Bulba (opera), by Mykola Lysenko
- Taras Bulba (rhapsody), an orchestral work by Leoš Janáček
- Taras Bulba (1962 film score) by Franz Waxman

== Other ==
- Korchma Taras Bulba

== See also ==
- Bulba (disambiguation)
- Taurus Bulba, a Darkwing Duck villain
