= Bulba (disambiguation) =

Bulba is a dance based on Belarusian folk traditions.

Bulba means "potato" in Belarusian and Ukrainian.

Bulba may also refer to:

- Taras Bulba (disambiguation), a surname of several persons
- Taurus Bulba, a character in Darkwing Duck
- Bulba River, Romania
- Roman Seleznev, known by the hacker name Bulba
- Bulba Ventures, Belarusian venture capital company
