= Taras Shevchenko Place =

Street in Manhattan, New York

Coordinates: 40°43′42.17″N 73°59′24.14″W

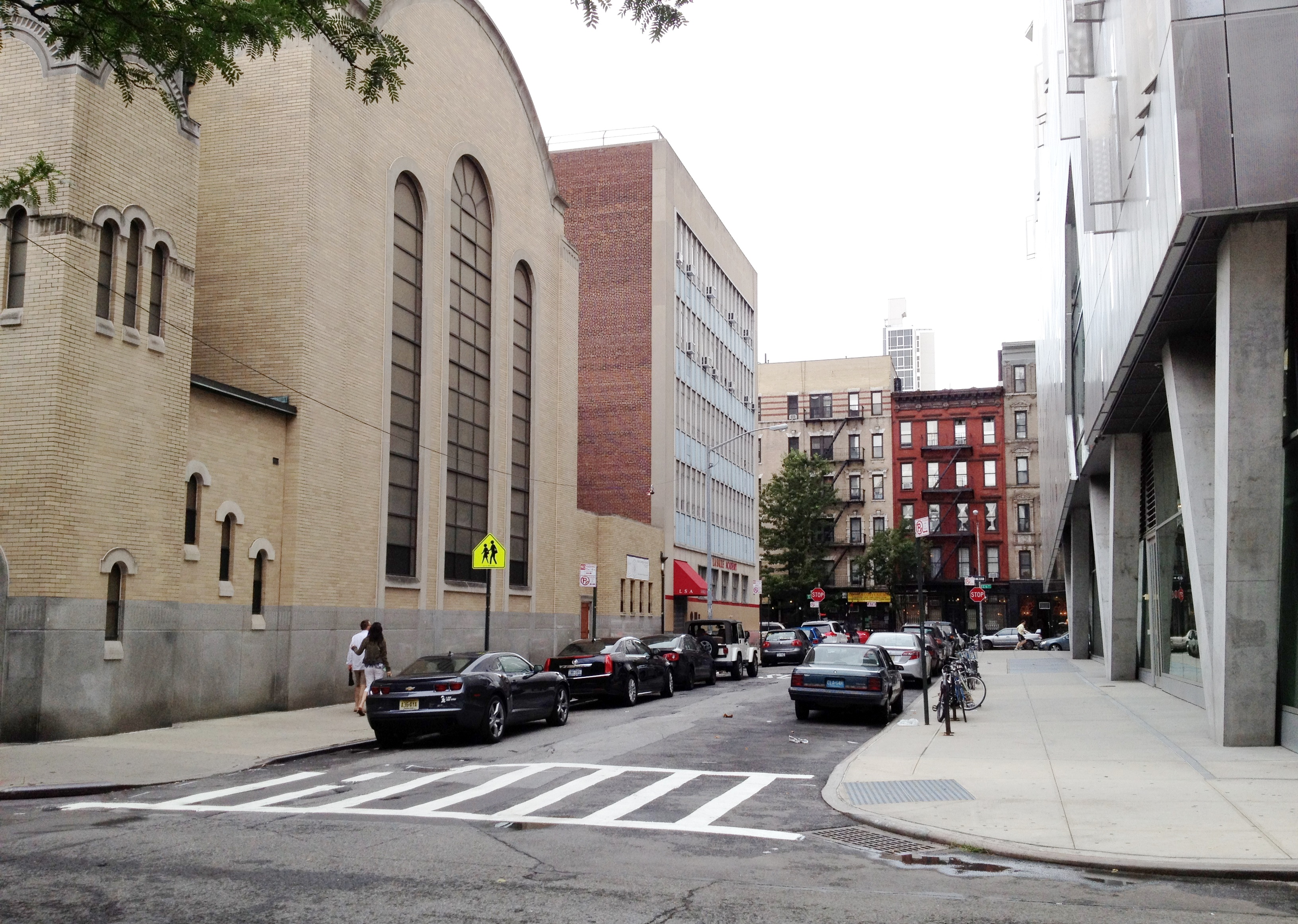
Taras Shevchenko Place looking south from McSorley's Old Ale House.

Taras Shevchenko Place is a street in New York City named after Taras Shevchenko, one of the greatest Ukrainian poets. Taras Shevchenko Place connects 6th Street and 7th Street between Second and Third Avenues in the East Village. It abuts the back of 41 Cooper Square to the west.

== History ==
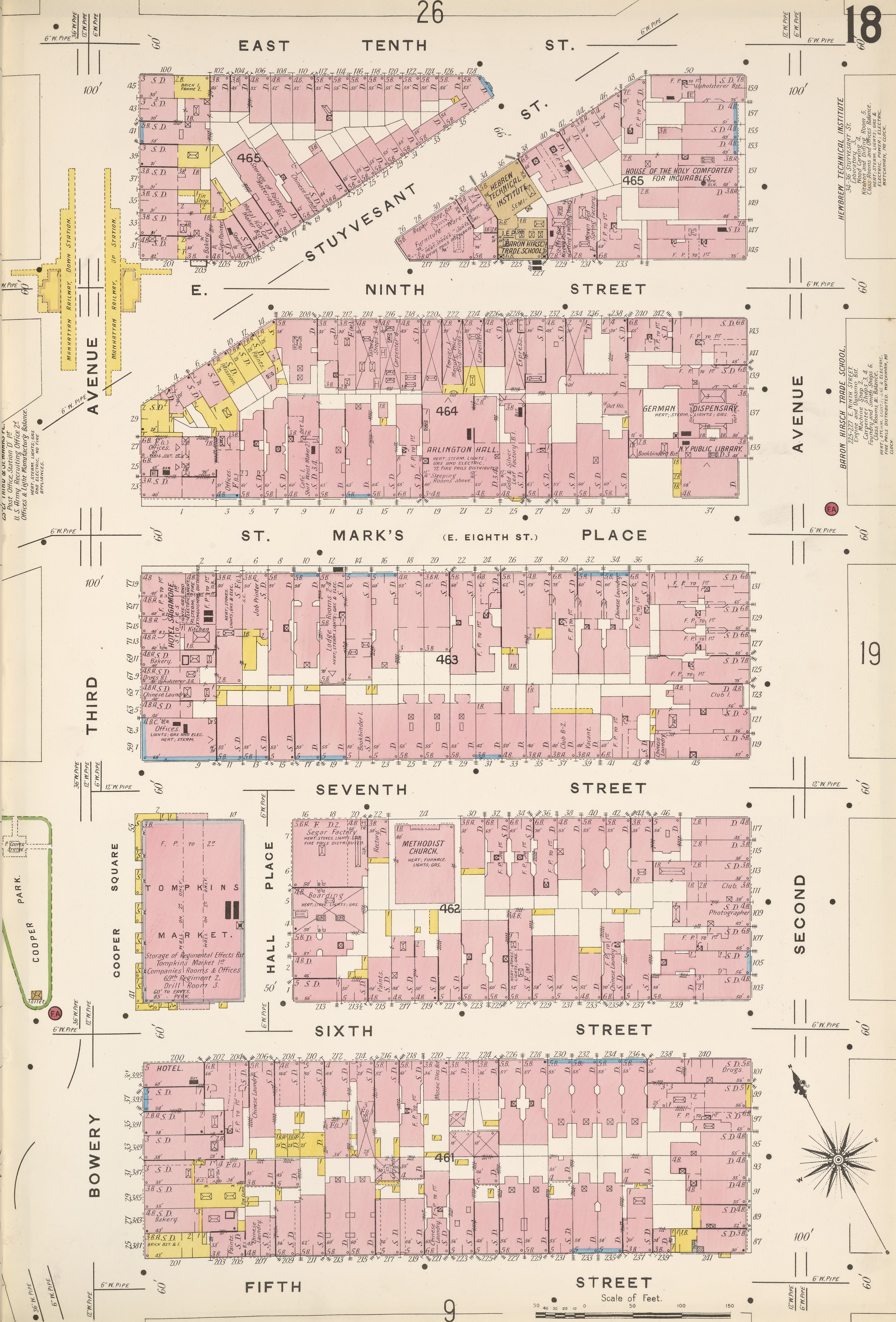
Hall Place on a map published in 1903

The street was originally named Hall Street in 1830 and became Hall Place in 1855. It was named after Charles Henry Hall, a Harlem landowner who sold the property to the city on December 23, 1828.

In the mid- to late 1970s, residents of the "Little Ukraine" section of the East Village and the United Ukrainian American Organizations of Greater New York organized a campaign to rename the street after Taras Shevchenko. A resolution to rename the street "Taras Shevchenko Place" was introduced to the New York City Council's Committee on Parks, Recreation and Cultural Affairs by Manhattan Councilman-at-large Henry J. Stern in February 1978 and was adopted by the committee on April 5, 1978, before being sent to the full council for confirmation.

Legislation to rename "Hall Place" as "Taras Shevchenko Place" was signed by Mayor Ed Koch on May 4, 1978. Prior to the bill being signed into law, a temporary street sign for "Taras Shevchenko Place" had been erected in time for the dedication of the adjacent Saint George Ukrainian Catholic Church on April 23, 1978. After the street was renamed, the St. George Ukrainian Post of the Catholic War Veterans announced proposed plans to close the street to traffic and convert it into a pedestrian plaza with additional trees and park benches.

In February 2001, the Cooper Union filed a Uniform Land Use Review Procedure application with the city to 'de-map' the street—removing it from the city map—to incorporate part of the street into a new nine-story academic building that would replace the two-story Hewitt Building. The remaining portion of the street was proposed to be converted into a pedestrian walkway or plaza that would continue to commemorate Taras Shevchenko. The application was made as part of a larger plan by the college to renovate and modernize the facilities on its campus. The proposal to de-map Taras Shevchenko Place was later withdrawn by the college after strong opposition from local residents.

A "Hall Place" street sign was re-installed in 2010.

== Namesake ==
Taras Shevchenko (1814–1861) was a Ukrainian writer, painter and political activist whose novels and poems, written in Ukrainian, gave forceful expression to his countrymen's national sentiment at a time when many aspects of their culture, especially the language, were being suppressed by the Russian Empire. In one of his poems, he called for an independent Ukrainian state to be led by a "Ukrainian Washington".

== See also ==
- Ukrainian Village, Manhattan
