= Visual arts of Ukraine since 2014 =

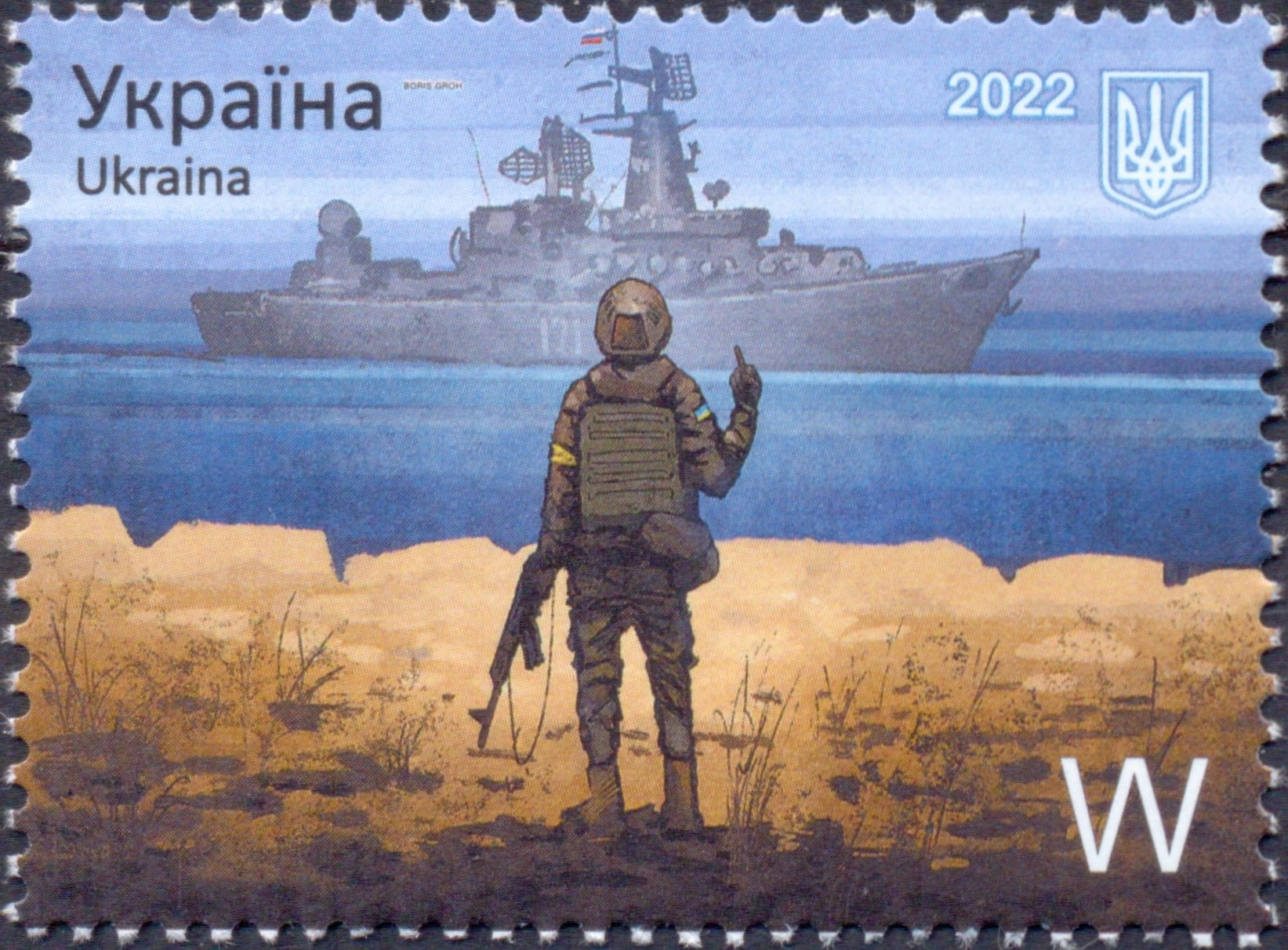
The Ukrainian commemorative stamp designed by Boris Groh, Russian warship, go…! Glory to Ukraine! (2022)

The visual arts of Ukraine since 2014 have been transformed since Russia’s annexation of Crimea of that year, the ongoing war in eastern Ukraine, and the full-scale invasion in 2022. Many artists have responded with documentary work, memorial projects, and anti-war installations. Mobile exhibitions, field archives, and virtual platforms have emerged to document the destruction of cultural heritage and the resilience of artistic communities under siege, such the exhibition I am a drop in the Ocean: Art of the Ukrainian Revolution (April–May 2014).

Artists such as Daria Koltsova, Nikita Shalennyi, Christian Borys and Ukrainian Emergency Art Fund members have mobilised art for humanitarian, therapeutic, and testimonial purposes. The role of art in wartime Ukraine is now not only aesthetic or conceptual but connected to resistance, witness, and survival.
