= Molotov Kitschen + Cocktails =

Restaurant in Denver, Colorado, U.S.

- Interactive map of Molotov Kitschen + Cocktails

Restaurant information
- Established: January 2023
- Food type: Ukrainian
- Location: 3333 East Colfax Avenue, Denver, Colorado, 80206, United States
- Coordinates: 39°44′25.2″N 104°56′53″W
- Website: molotovdenver.com

Molotov Kitschen + Cocktails is a Ukrainian restaurant in Denver, Colorado. Established in January 2023, the business was included in The New York Times's 2023 list of the 50 best restaurants in the United States.

== See also ==
- List of restaurants in Denver
- List of Ukrainian restaurants
