= Stuyvesant Casino =

New York nightclub (1910–1950s)

Stuyvesant Casino was a nightclub located in what is now the Ukrainian National Home at 140-142 Second Avenue (between Ninth St. and St. Mark's Place) in Manhattan's East Village. It opened in 1910 and was owned and operated by Gerson Schmidt and later his son, through the 1950s. In its early years it was a home for organized crime, especially so-called Jewish gangsters in the early 20th century before becoming a home for Dixieland Jazz in the 1940s.
