= Kiev Restaurant =

- Interactive map of Kiev Restaurant

Restaurant information
- Established: 1978
- Closed: 2006
- Previous owner: Michael Hrynenko
- Location: 117 Second Avenue, New York City, New York, 10003, U.S.
- Coordinates: 40°43′40.8″N 73°59′18.4″W

The Kiev Restaurant (also known as the Kiev Diner or simply The Kiev) was a Ukrainian restaurant located in the East Village section of New York City.

Founded in 1978 by Soviet emigrant to the United States Michael Hrynenko (1954–2004), the site was the former location of Louis Auster's Candy Shop, who was one of the original creators of the egg cream.

Kiev for most of its existence was open for business 24 hours a day, 7 days a week. It was located at 117 Second Avenue, on the southwest corner of the intersection of Second Avenue and Seventh Street. At one time, the area was known as the "Pierogi Belt" because of the large number of Ukrainian restaurants; by 2007, only a few remained, such as Veselka. Kiev was popular for Ukrainians who attended St. George's Church down the street, who would go out for brunch after service at Kiev. In its original form, Kiev was closed in 2000 by its owner. It then went through several abortive remodelings and reopenings, closing for good in 2006.

The cuisine was largely Eastern European, including pierogi, challah, matzah brei, kasha varnishkis (kasha over bow-tie pasta), blintzes, fruit compote and so on, though typically American items such as french fries were also available.

The restaurant was a local cultural institution, famed not only for its cuisine and perpetual availability but also for the eclectic and colorful variety of patrons. It is mentioned in the song "Detachable Penis" by the band King Missile. Poets Allen Ginsberg and Ted Berrigan included the Kiev in poems. The restaurant had many other notable regulars during its tenure.

== See also ==
- List of Ukrainian restaurants
- Veselka
