= List of Ukrainian restaurants =

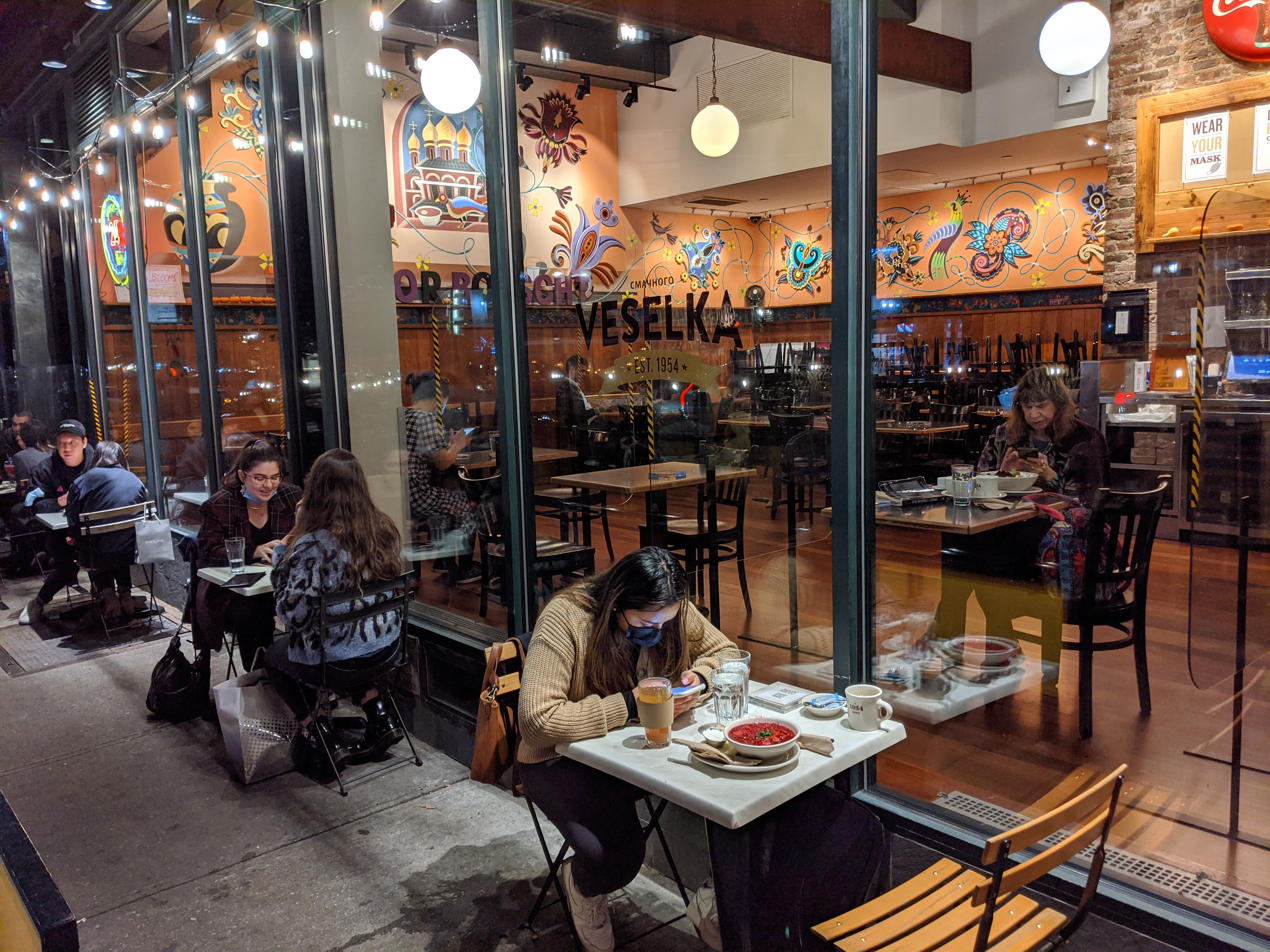
Veselka in New York City

Following is a list of Ukrainian restaurants:

== Current ==
- Korchma Taras Bulba, Moscow (1999–present)
- Molotov Kitschen + Cocktails, Denver (2023–present)
- Veselka, New York City (1954–present)

== Defunct ==
- Dacha, Hong Kong (2015–2024)
- Kiev Restaurant, New York City (1978–2006)
