= Daria Koltsova =

Ukrainian artist (born 1987)

Daria Koltsova (born 1987, Kharkiv, Ukraine) is a contemporary Ukrainian artist working across installation, performance, stained glass, and socially engaged art. Her work addresses memory, trauma, war, and the fragility of the individual in the face of historical violence. Koltsova has emerged as one of the voices in Ukrainian conceptual art since the 2010s, particularly following Russia's annexation of Crimea and the ongoing war in Ukraine.

== Early life and education ==
Daria Koltsova was born in 1987 in Kharkiv, one of Ukraine's major cultural and academic centres. She studied at the Kharkiv State Academy of Design and Arts, graduating with a degree in History and Theory of Art. During her early career, she was closely associated with the Kharkiv artistic scene before relocating to Kyiv, where she became actively involved in the Ukrainian contemporary art movement.

In 2017, she was awarded a Gaude Polonia scholarship by the Polish Ministry of Culture and National Heritage, allowing her to pursue further artistic development in Poland. As of 2023, she is a candidate for a Master of Fine Art at the Ruskin School of Art, University of Oxford, UK.

== Artistic practice ==
Koltsova's multidisciplinary practice includes installation, video, performance, stained glass, and participatory work. Her artistic language is rooted in conceptualism and engages critically with collective memory, social trauma, and the afterlives of violence. Much of her work is informed by personal experience and broader Ukrainian history, particularly the post-2014 sociopolitical landscape.

She is known for incorporating fragile and symbolic materials such as glass, cloth, and earth into her work, often creating spaces for reflection and mourning. Koltsova’s work frequently intersects with themes of care, witnessing, and commemoration, placing the viewer in intimate relation to loss, resilience, and displacement.

== Selected works ==
- Lullaby (2022) – A sound and object installation presented at the World Economic Forum in Davos, addressing war-related trauma through lullabies collected from Ukrainian mothers.
- Tessellated Self (2023) – A large-scale stained-glass installation exhibited at Museum Ludwig, Cologne, as part of HERE AND NOW: Modernism in Ukraine. The work juxtaposes traditional craft with contemporary subjectivity, exploring fragmented identity.
- The Kiosk (2023) – Exhibited during the UKU Festival in Tallinn, Estonia, the installation transformed a Soviet-era kiosk into a memorial space lined with stained-glass postcards and sunflower sculptures.
- Theory of Protection (2022) – An installation and performance series shown at Suprainfinit Gallery in Bucharest, reflecting on bodily fragility, historical erasure, and rituals of preservation.
- As the Stars Fell on Me (2023) – A mixed-media exhibition exploring cosmology and loss, presented at KWS Art Lounge in Germany.

== Exhibitions ==
Koltsova has participated in solo and group exhibitions across Europe, including:

- Captured House, Alte Münze, Berlin (2022)
- As the Stars Fell on Me, KWS Art Lounge, Einbeck (2023)
- HERE AND NOW, Museum Ludwig, Cologne (2023)
- UKU Festival, Tallinn (2023)
- Venice Biennale (collaborative projects)
- Various exhibitions at Shcherbenko Art Centre, Kyiv

== Awards and recognition ==
- Grand Prix, MUHi Competition for Young Ukrainian Artists (2015)
- PinchukArtCentre Prize, Nominee (2015)
- Gaude Polonia Fellowship, Polish Ministry of Culture (2017)
- NonStopMedia IX, Finalist (2018)

Her work has been supported by institutions such as the Goethe-Institut, European Cultural Foundation, and Ukrainian Emergency Art Fund, and she has participated in numerous international residencies and curatorial collaborations.

== Critical reception ==
Koltsova has been recognised for her sensitive handling of political trauma through poetic and materially resonant forms. Critics have noted her ability to merge traditional media, such as stained glass, with urgent contemporary narratives, particularly those emerging from the war in Ukraine. Her works are often described as “quiet acts of resistance” and “memorials in flux,” occupying the space between documentary and ritual.

== Further reading and external links ==
- Shcherbenko Art Centre Profile
- HERE AND NOW at Museum Ludwig. Modernism in Ukraine 1900–1930 & Daria Koltsova
- MutualArt Biography
