= Korchma Taras Bulba =

Ukrainian cuisine restaurant chain

- Company type: Private company
- Genre: Family dining
- Founded: 1999
- Founder: Jury Beloyvan
- Headquarters: Moscow (Russia), Kyiv (Ukraine)
- Number of locations: 17
- Products: traditional Ukrainian cuisine

Korchma Taras Bulba is chain of restaurants which was developed by Juriy Beloyvan in 1999.

== History ==
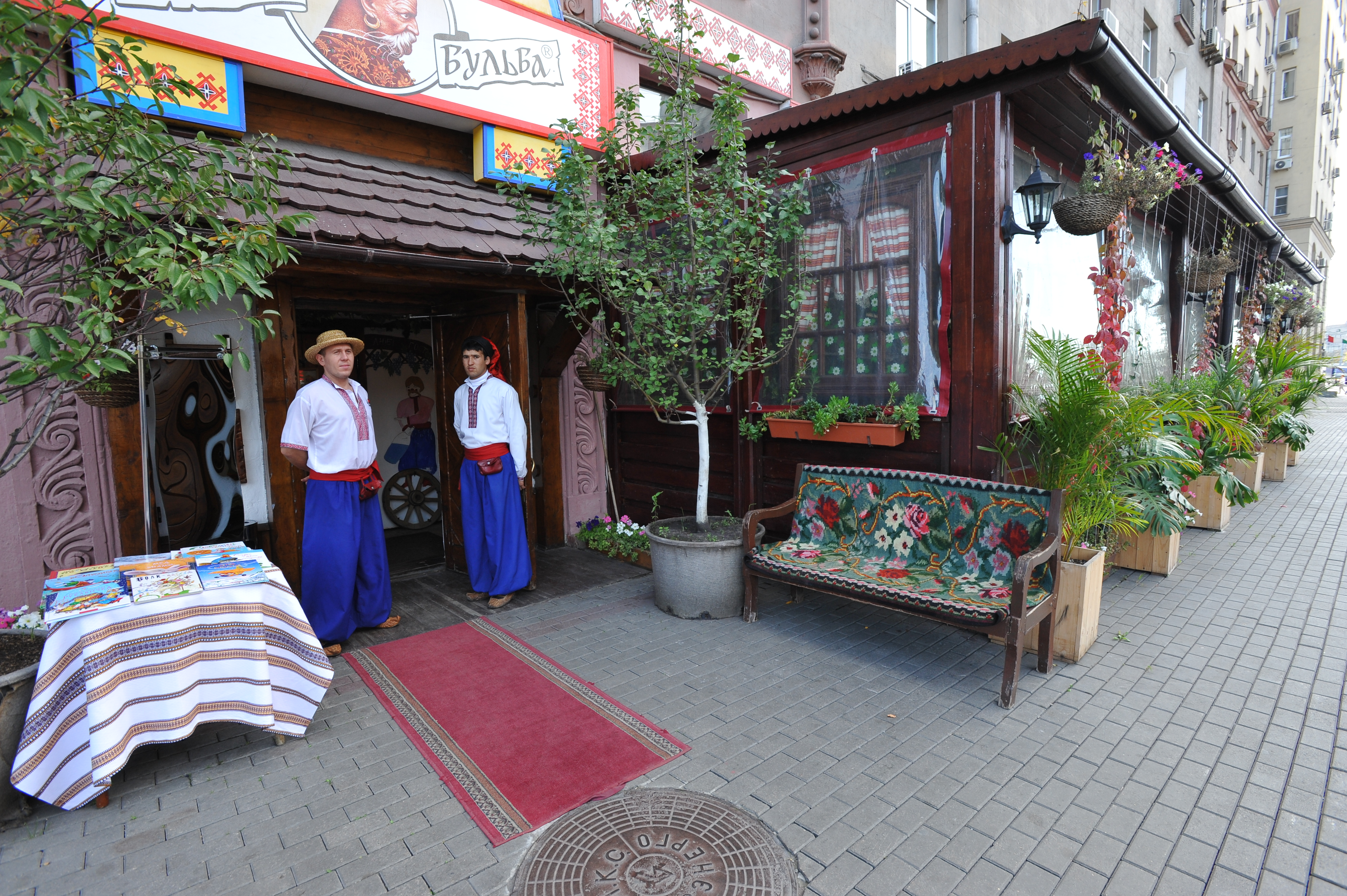
The first tavern “Korchma Taras Bulba” in Moscow

The first tavern “Korchma Taras Bulba” in Moscow was opened on 25 March 1999 at 30/7 Petrovka Str. At the present time the chain of restaurants is presented in Moscow (16 restaurants) and Kyiv (1 restaurant). The opening of “Korchma Taras Bulba” in New York is planned for 2013. “Korchma Taras Bulba” is specialized in traditional Ukrainian cuisine. The interior design of the restaurants also represents traditional Ukrainian tavern. * “Korchma Taras Bulba” actively promotes books for children issued by Ukrainian publishing house A-ba-ba-ga-la-ma-ga, providing all organization and financing the Moscow representative office of the publishing house. * Vladimir Putin visited “Korchma Taras Bulba” in Moscow in 2013. When leaving he did not refuse to drink one for the road (in Russian – “na pososhok”, in Ukrainian “na konya”). Marathon club “Korchma Taras Bulba” was founded in 2004.

In the summer of 2020, Jury Beloyvan was put on the international wanted list due to his repeated absence at interrogations after the criminal proceeding against him was opened in February of the same year as a result of tax audit held in 2014–2015. In February 2021, the businessman was arrested in absentia by The Court of Presnensky District of Moscow in the matter of tax default worth 57 million roubles. In November 2021, Arbitration Court of Moscow terminated the proceeding in bankruptcy petition of Jury Beloyvan due to remission of claim by the debtor. Validity of petition from the part of Federal Taxation Service about Mr. Beloyvan's bankruptcy will be studied by the Court in January, 2022.

== Interior ==
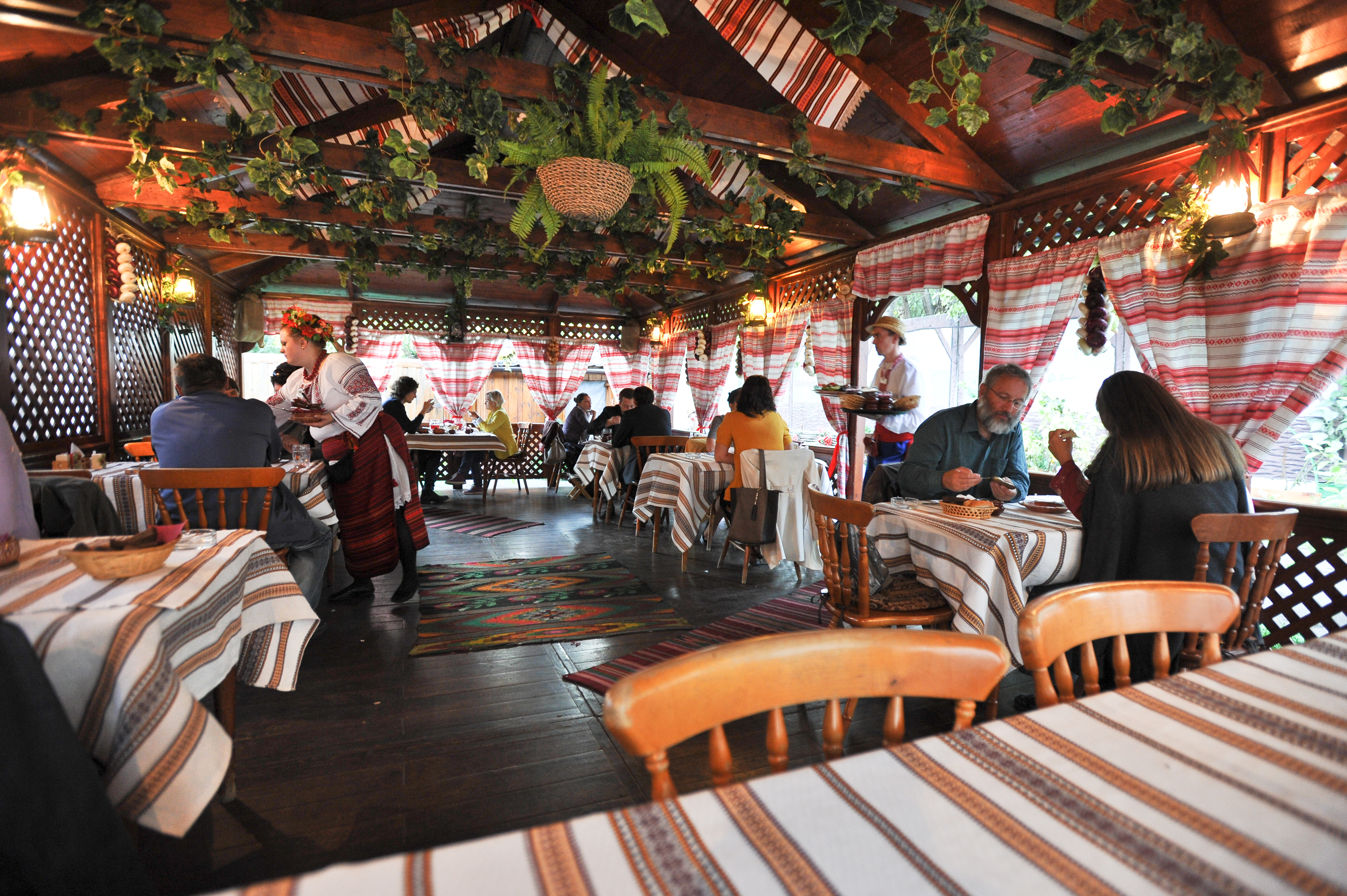
The interior of “Korchma Taras Bulba”

For the interior of “Korchma Taras Bulba” designers used wooden furniture, embroidered towels, homespun carpets and runners, tablecloths and valances, as well as elements of dead hedge, greybeards, rouses and other items which are typical for Ukrainian rural huts. The interior decoration was designed by Konstantin Lavrov, the honored artist of Ukraine and prize winner after Lesya Ukrainka and T. G. Shevchenko.

== Menu ==
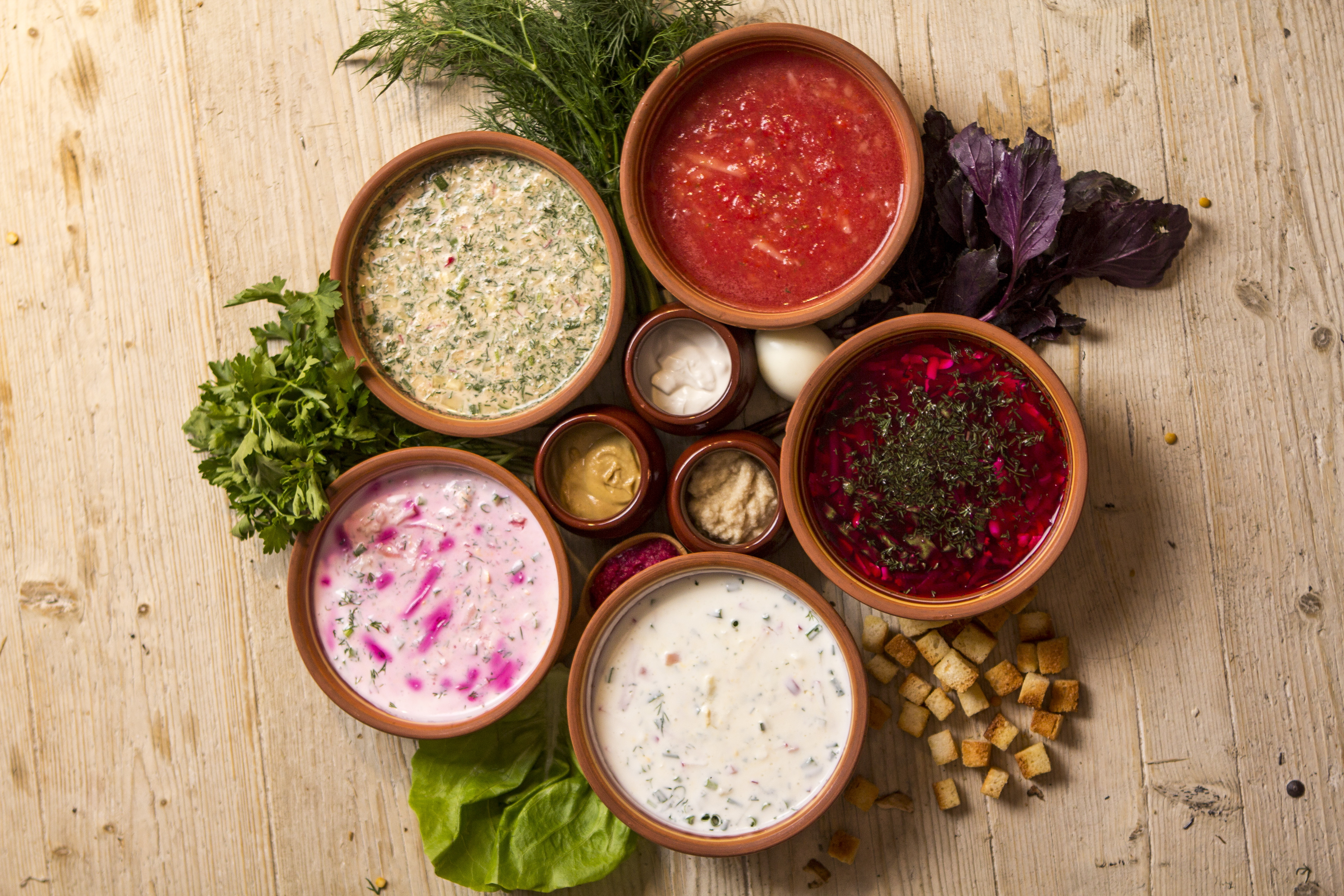
The menu represents traditional Ukrainian cuisine dishes

The menu represents traditional Ukrainian cuisine dishes: nourishing borshch with pampushky (garlic donuts), dumplings, pancakes with various fillings, chicken Kiev (cutlets a-la Kyiv). “Korchma Taras Bulba” offers homemade potions and wines, liqueurs, Russian vodka or Ukrainian horilka. There is a special "express menu". * All agricultural products for “Korchma Taras Bulba” are grown at own farm "Kazachie" Ltd., situated in Ryazan Region.

== See also ==
- List of Ukrainian restaurants

== Resources ==
- Official website
- expat
- moscow-life
- way to russia
- complex cty-guide
- menu.ru
- irecommend.ru
- restoran.ua
- Gazeta.ua
