= Ukrainian National Home =

Coordinates: 40°43′44″N 73°59′14″W

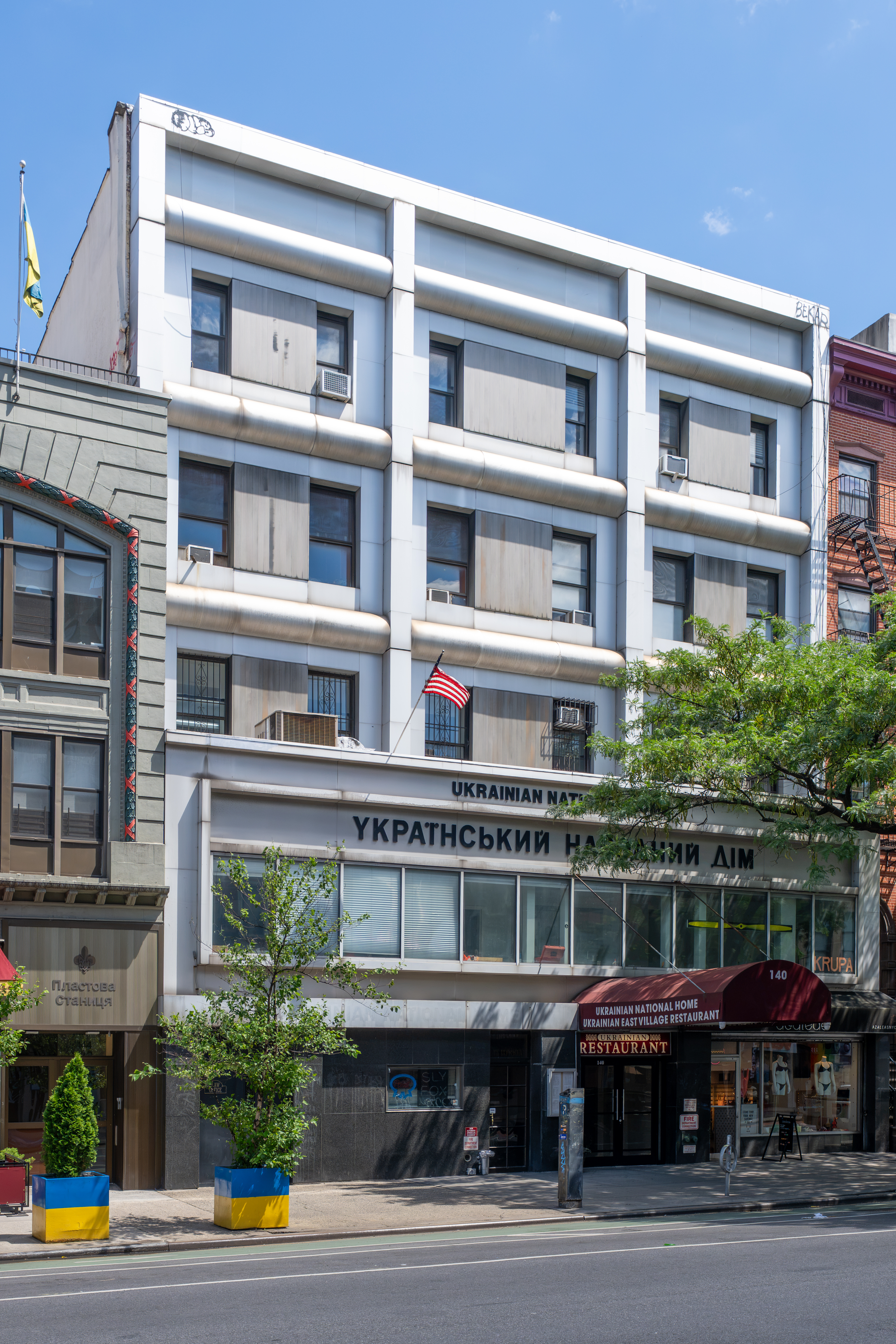
The building in 2026

The Ukrainian National Home is located at 140–142 Second Avenue (between Ninth Street and St. Mark's Place) in Manhattan's East Village. The building, which currently operates as a restaurant known as the Ukrainian East Village Restaurant, dates back as far as 1830, and has served as a private home, YMCA location, and the Stuyvesant Casino. UK rock band New Order played one of their first shows there on November 18, 1981.
