= St. George Academy =

- Академія Святого Юра
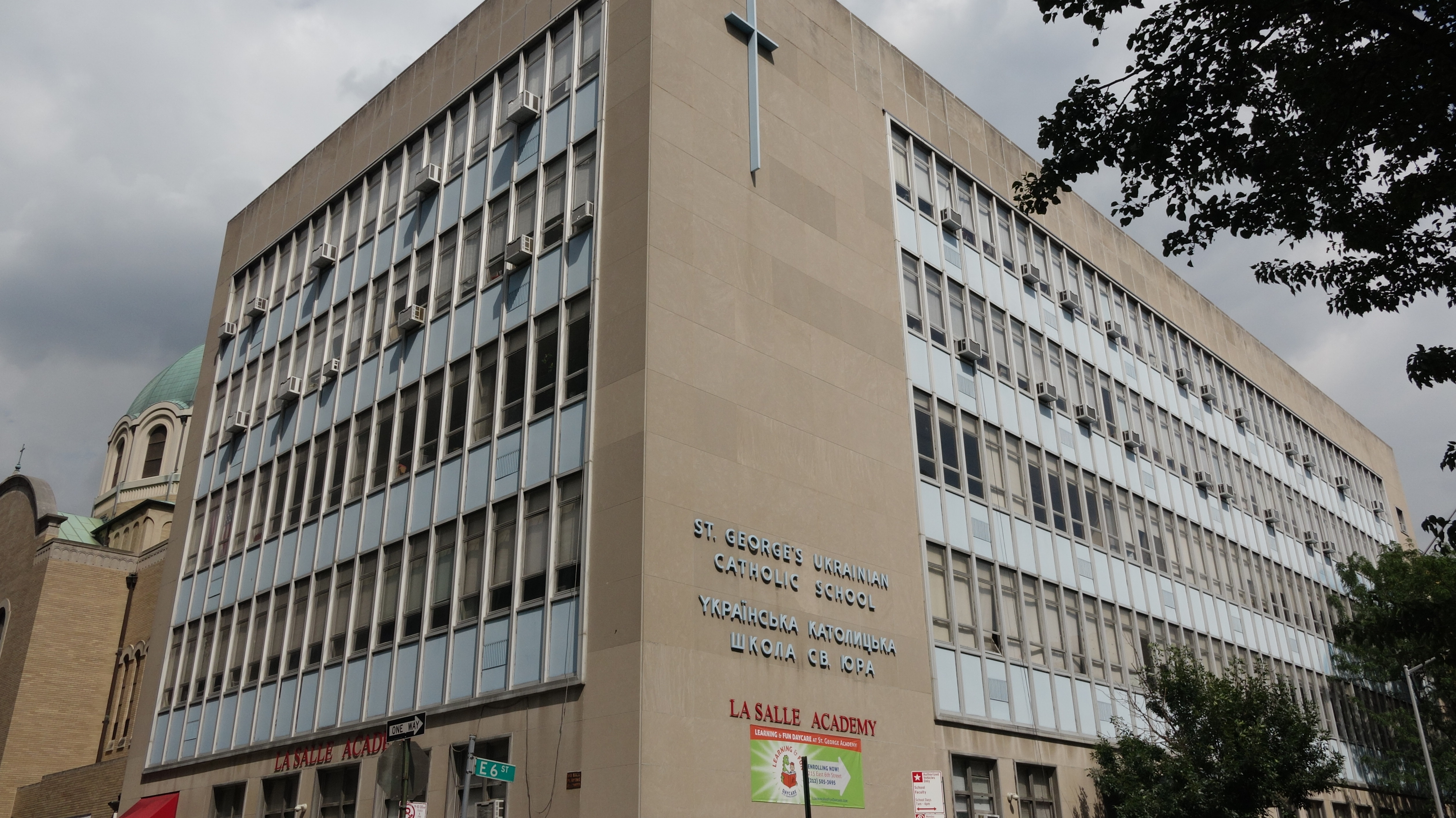
- School building

Location
- 215 East 6th Street (East Village, Manhattan); New York City, New York 10003; United States; 40°43′41″N 73°59′23″W

Information
- Type: Private, co-educational
- Religious affiliation: Ukrainian-Catholic
- Established: 1947 (79 years ago)
- Founder: Order of Saint Basil the Great
- Oversight: Ukrainian Catholic Eparchy of Stamford
- Superintendent: Dr. Timothy McNiff
- Administrator: Halia Tsish-Kec
- Principal: Andrew Stasiw
- Assistant Principal: Dr. Christine Rogutsky
- Chaplain: Rev. Deacon Vitaliy Kit
- Grades: 9–12
- Enrollment: 70 (2026-2027)
- Colors: Green and gold
- Athletics: Basketball, soccer, and volleyball
- Team name: Crusaders
- Accreditation: Board of Regents of the University of the State of New York
- Tuition: $15,000 (2018–2019) (financial aid and scholarships available; International Arts Program rates adjusted higher for specialized programs)
- Affiliation: Roman Catholic Archdiocese of New York
- Directors of Counseling: Jessica Katz & Jake Petzold
- Athletic Director: Nick Iadevaio
- Website: saintgeorgeacademy.net

Saint George Academy, owned by St. George's Ukrainian Catholic School (Ukrainian: Українська Католицька Школа Святого Юра), is an American private, Catholic high school, located in the East Village neighborhood of the Manhattan borough of New York City.

It is located within the Roman Catholic Archdiocese of New York. Currently, Success Academy has signed a long-term lease to rent parts of the building from Saint George Academy, pending NY Attorney General approval.

== Background ==
The school was founded in 1947 by the Fathers of the Order of Saint Basil the Great.

The school was historically heavily Ukrainian American, with 900 being the peak enrollment of students of Ukrainian origin.

In 2022 its enrollment was 80, with 37% of that figure being of Ukrainian ancestry. The school community became concerned after the 2022 invasion of Ukraine due to its ties to Ukraine. By March 2022, three refugees from the war became students at St. George Academy. Currently the school has 70 students.

Beginning in the 2026-2027 school year, the school began seeking authorization as an International Baccalaureate (IB) World School and introduced the IB Middle Years Programme framework.

== Dual-Credit Program ==
Saint George describes the program as one part of a tiered approach to academic challenge. Students take on more advanced work as they move through the school, and the program’s stated aim is “the right challenge at the right time.” The school presents the college courses as a way for students to meet college-level expectations while keeping the close relationships and support of a small high school. By graduation, students are expected to be able to manage their own workload, advocate for themselves, and handle new academic demands. The program sits alongside the school’s other academic offerings, including the IB Middle Years Programme, “NYC Is Our Classroom,” and college counseling.

=== Partner institution ===
The dual-credit program offers college-level coursework through a partnership with St. John’s University. Under this arrangement, qualified Saint George students can earn St. John’s University credit while still in high school. The school presents the program as a way for students to meet college-level expectations while keeping the support of a small high school community, so that they arrive at college ready to manage their own work and advocate for themselves.

== See also ==
- Saint George Ukrainian Catholic Church
