= Apollinare Osadca =

American architect

- Аполінарій Осадца
- Born: November 12, 1916; Voloshchyna, Austria-Hungary (now Ukraine)
- Died: September 15, 1997 (aged 80); Glen Spey, New York, United States
- Occupation: Architect

Apollinare Osadca, (Note: Ukrainian: Аполінарій Осадца, romanized: Apolinarii Osadtsa) AIA (November 12, 1916 – September 15, 1997) was a Ukrainian-American architect active in New York City.

== Early life and education ==
Osadca was born in Woloshchyna, Austria-Hungary, now Ternopil Oblast, Ukraine. He earned a diploma in engineering and architecture at the Polytechnic of Lviv in occupied USSR in 1942. He emigrated to the United States in 1949 after staying in a displaced person's camp after the war.

== Architectural practice ==
Osadca founded his firm practicing under his own name in 1955 and was registered as an architect in Connecticut, Louisiana, New Jersey, New York, and Pennsylvania. In 1970, his offices were located in Forest Hills, Queens. His primary clients were Ukrainian groups in the Northeast United States, and his principal works included Sacred Heart Convent (Astoria, New York; 1962), the Ukrainian National Home (Hartford, Connecticut; 1965), Holy Cross Ukrainian Cathedral Church (Astoria, New York; 1966), St. Nicholas Ukrainian Cathedral Church (Passaic, New Jersey; 1969), and St. Volodymyr Ukrainian Cathedral Church (Glen Spey, New York; 1969).

Osadca's most prominent work in New York City is St. George's Church (1977). The authors of the AIA Guide to New York City described it as "A Greek Revival temple in stucco, with a mini-onion dome", regretting the "domed symbol of the parish's wealth and burgeoning membership: Miami Beach on 7th Street replaces the real Greek Revival thing."
