= Veselka =

Ukrainian restaurant in New York City

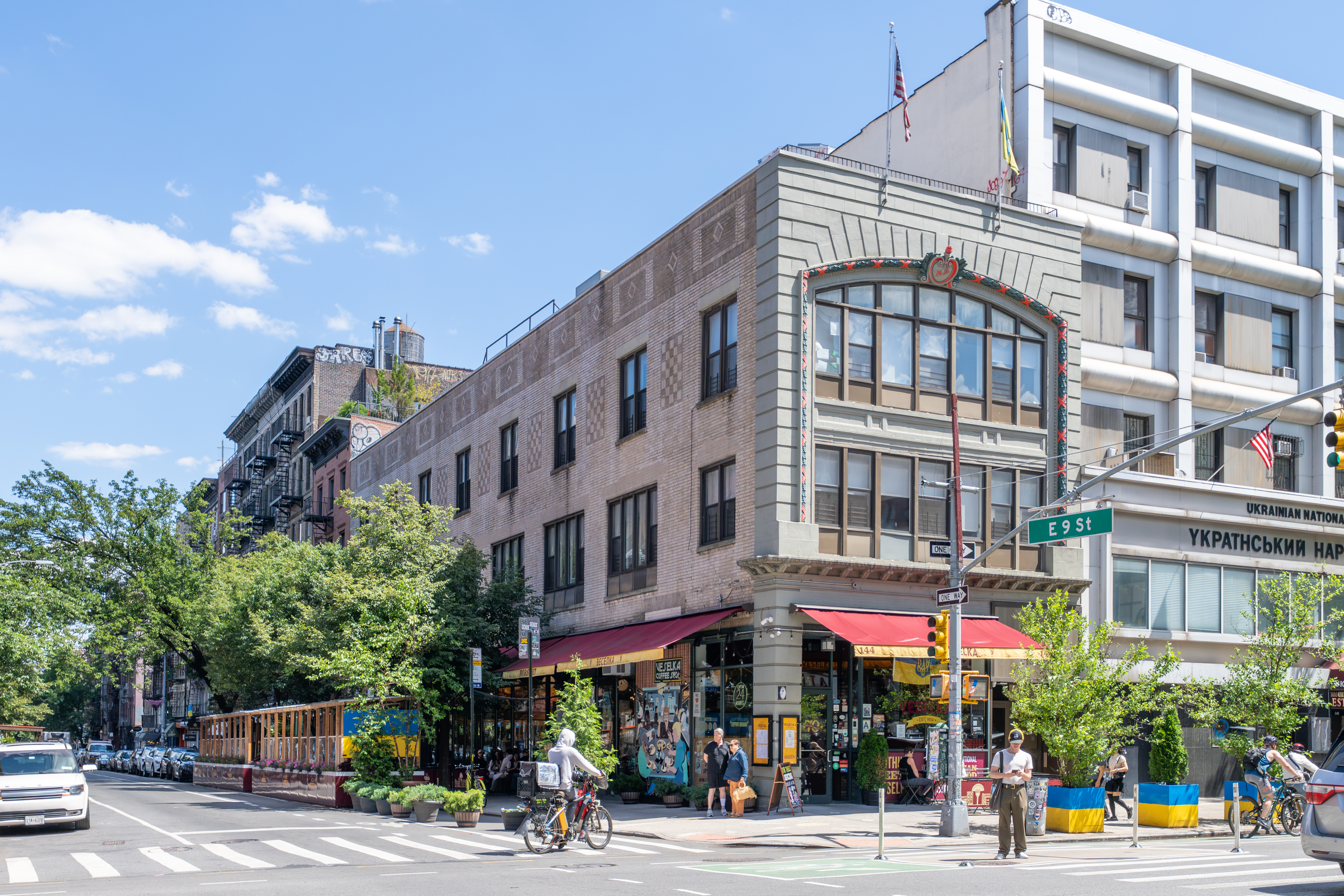
- Interactive map of Veselka

Restaurant information
- Established: 1954
- Owners: Tom Birchard, Jason Birchard
- Food type: Ukrainian, Eastern European, American comfort
- Dress code: Casual
- Location: 144 Second Avenue, New York City, New York, 10003, United States
- Coordinates: 40°43′44.32″N 73°59′13.55″W
- Reservations: Not taken
- Other locations: Veselka Grand Central
- Other information: Family owned and operated
- Website: www.veselka.com

Veselka is a Ukrainian restaurant at 144 Second Avenue in the East Village neighborhood of Manhattan in New York City. It was established in 1954 by Wolodymyr Darmochwal (Ukrainian: Володимир Дармохвал) and his wife, Olha Darmochwal (Ukrainian: Ольга Дармохвал), post–World War II Ukrainian refugees. Veselka is one of the last of many Slavic restaurants that once proliferated in the neighborhood. A cookbook, published in October 2009 by St. Martin's Press, highlights more than 120 of the restaurant's Eastern European recipes.

== History ==
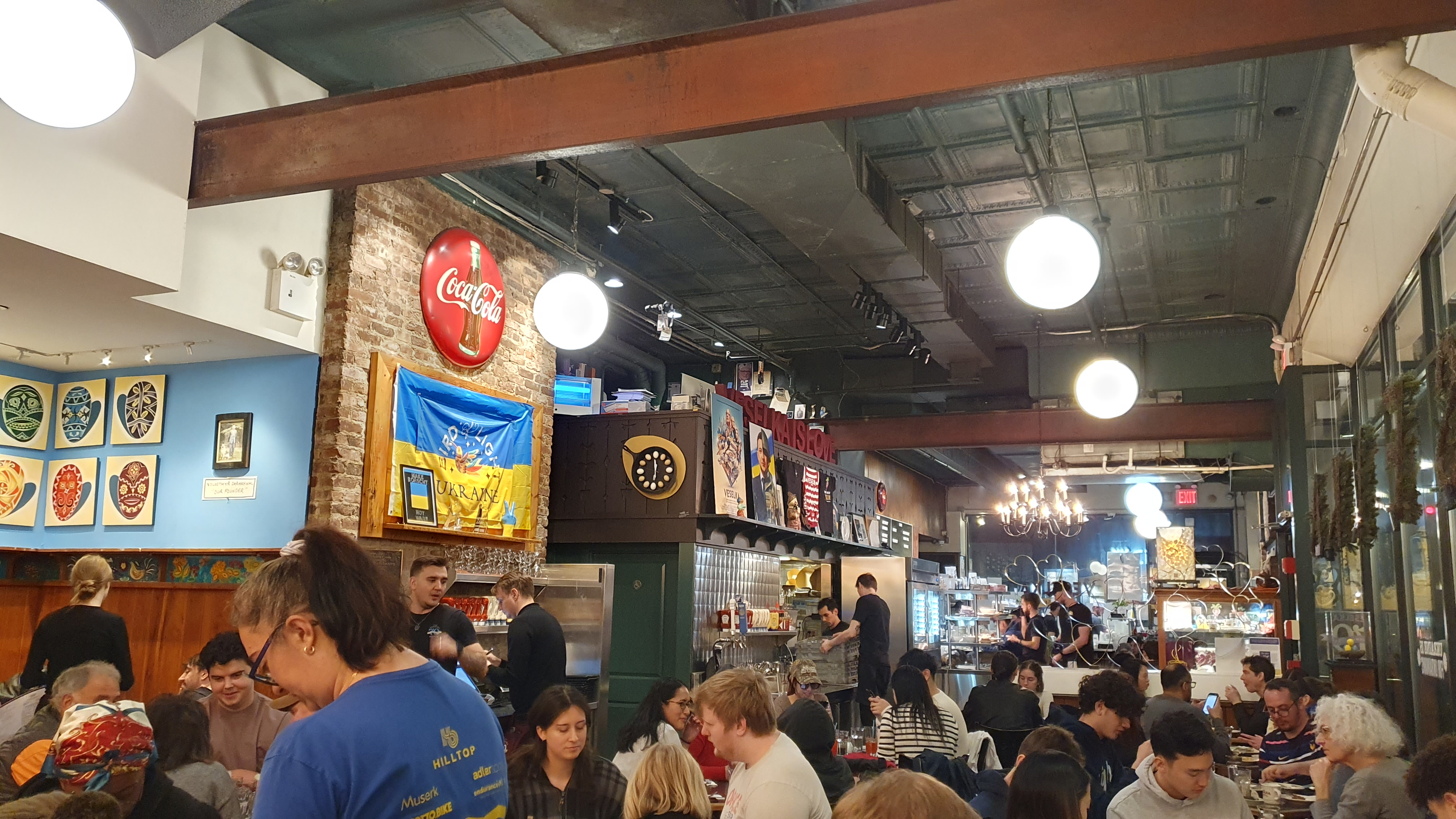
Inside the restaurant in 2025

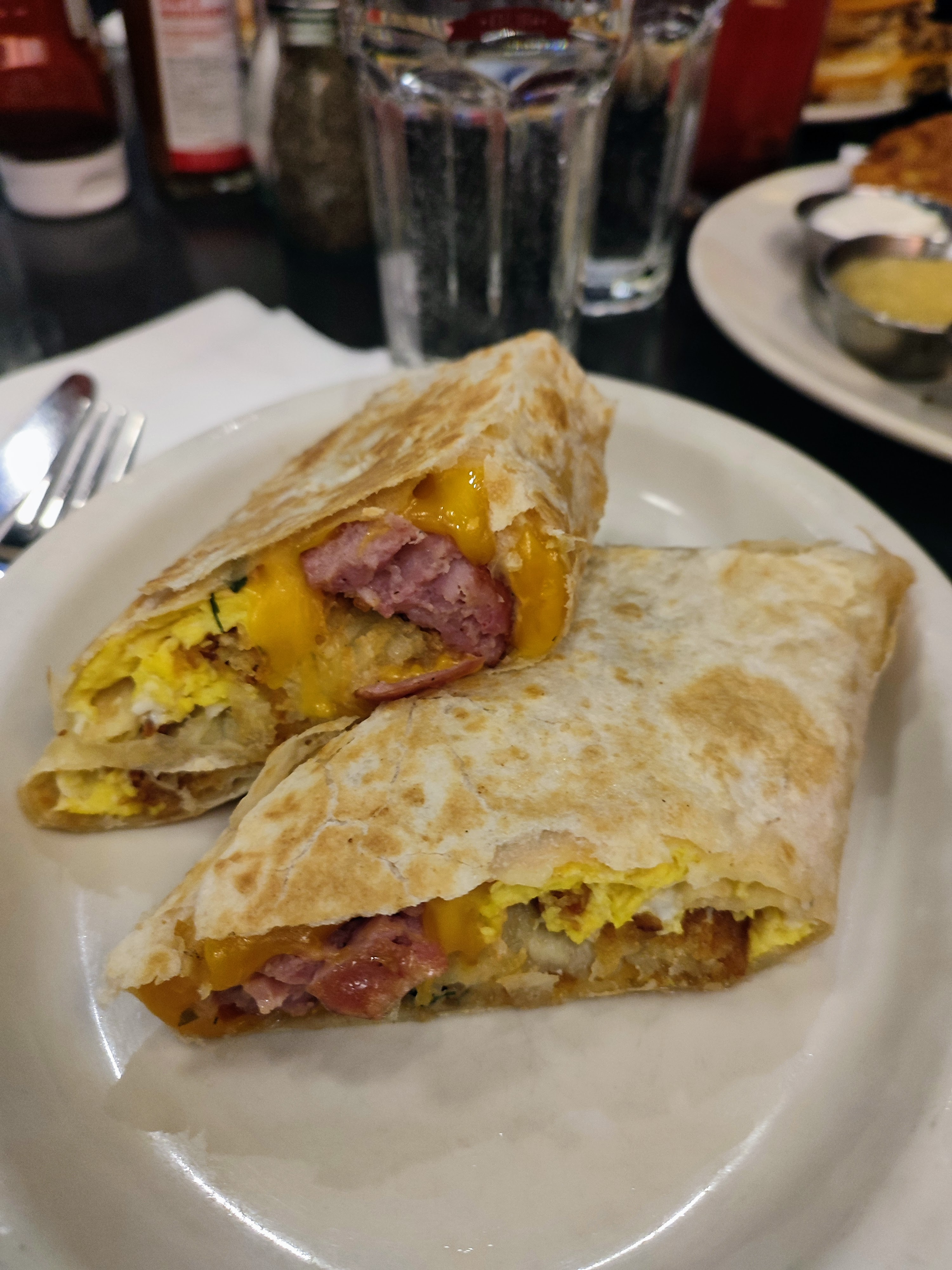
Breakfast burrito

=== 144 Second Avenue ===
In the 1930s, the building housed what was known as the Boulevard Restaurant.

On April 10, 1937, several young thieves tried to pull off a robbery of the late-night restaurant and gambling joint and ended up killing a plain-clothes cop. The incident became celebrated as the case of “the East Side Boys” and resulted in the execution of three of the seven youths involved.

=== Veselka ===
In 1954, the Darmochwals purchased a candy shop and newsstand at Second Avenue and East 9th Street in New York City in an effort to help Plast, the Ukrainian scouting organization purchase the building that housed its headquarters. Wolodymyr Darmochwal, an active Plast member, gave this venture the moniker "Veselka", from веселка, the Ukrainian word for "rainbow." In 1960, Darmochwal combined the candy store and newsstand with an adjacent luncheonette. The New York chapter of Plast still uses the building to this day.

In the following years, as the East Village became known as the Haight-Ashbury of the east coast, Veselka became a social center for a cross-section of the community that included old-world tradition and new-world counterculture.

Veselka was nearly forced to close in the mid-1970s, when the construction of the Second Avenue Subway (later canceled) resulted in street closures along the adjacent section of Second Avenue. By the time the New York City fiscal crisis hit in the 1970s, Veselka was a fixture in the neighborhood. It was able to expand during the economic recovery of the 1980s, at which time the row of phone booths at the rear of the restaurant came to be used as informal office space for East Village performance artists.

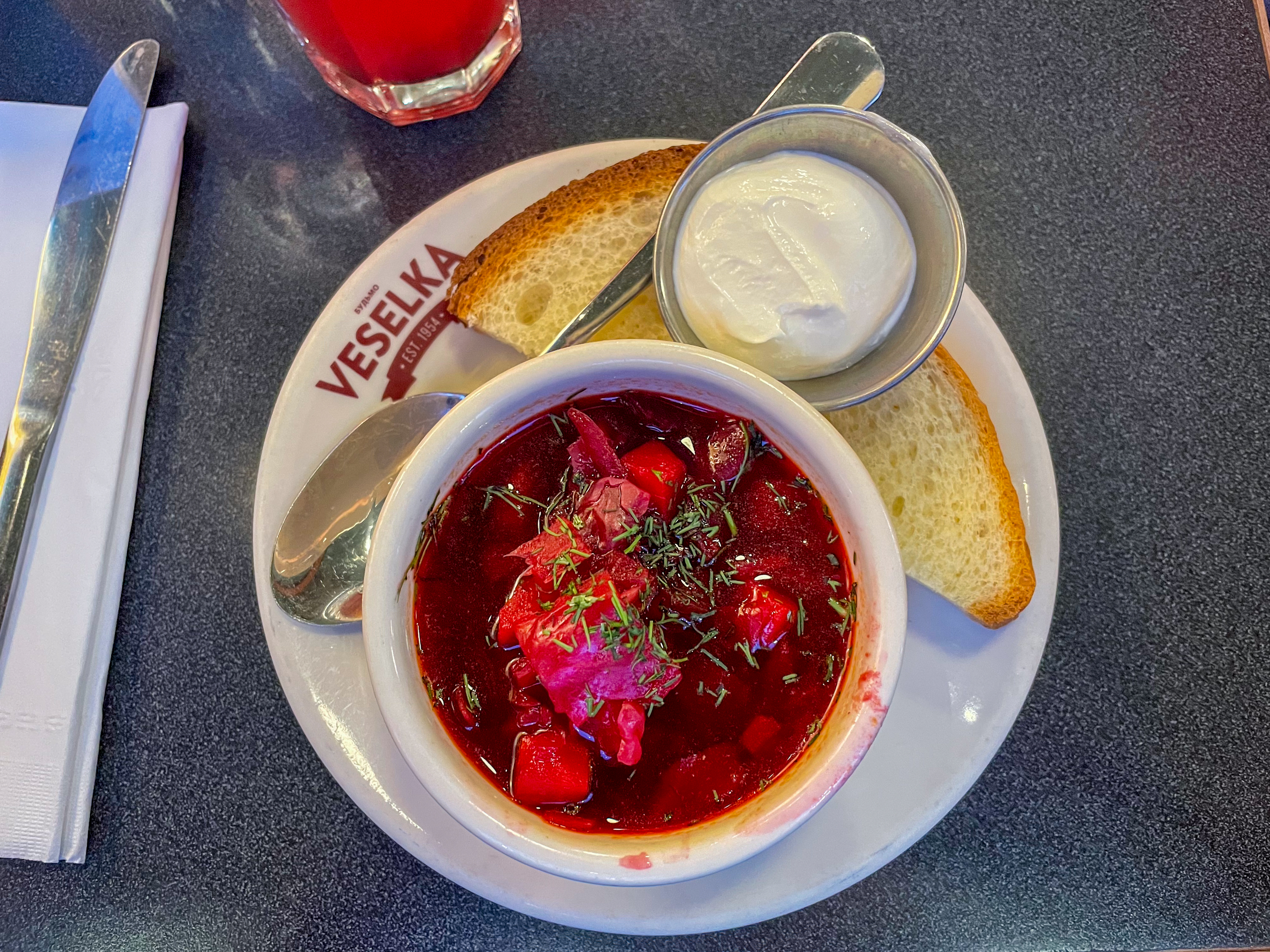
Borscht

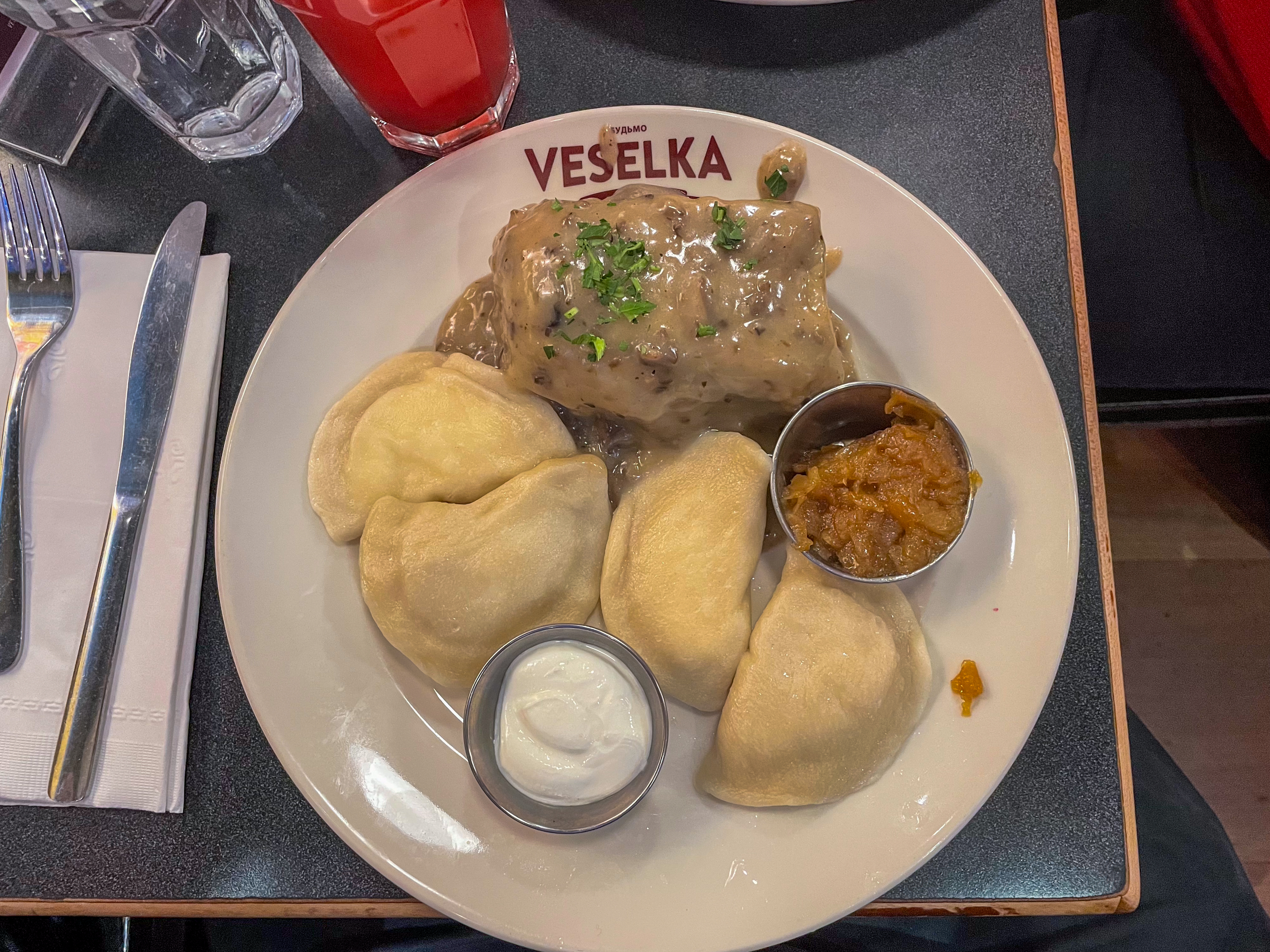
Vegetarian pierogi

Veselka produces 3,000 pierogi by hand every day and uses 500 pounds of beets to make 5,000 gallons of borscht every week. The restaurant has attracted notable patrons including musician Ryan Adams, artist Sally Davies, director Bart Freundlich, performance artist Penny Arcade, comedian Jon Stewart and actors Julianne Moore, Chris Noth, Parker Posey, Justin Long and Debra Messing (who considers Veselka her "late-night mainstay" and her "absolute favorite place").

Veselka remains a family-run business: as of 2020, it is owned by Darmochwal's son-in-law, Tom Birchard, who began working at Veselka in 1967, and run by the founder's grandson, Jason Birchard. The founders' son, Mykola Darmochwal, maintains a role as consultant.

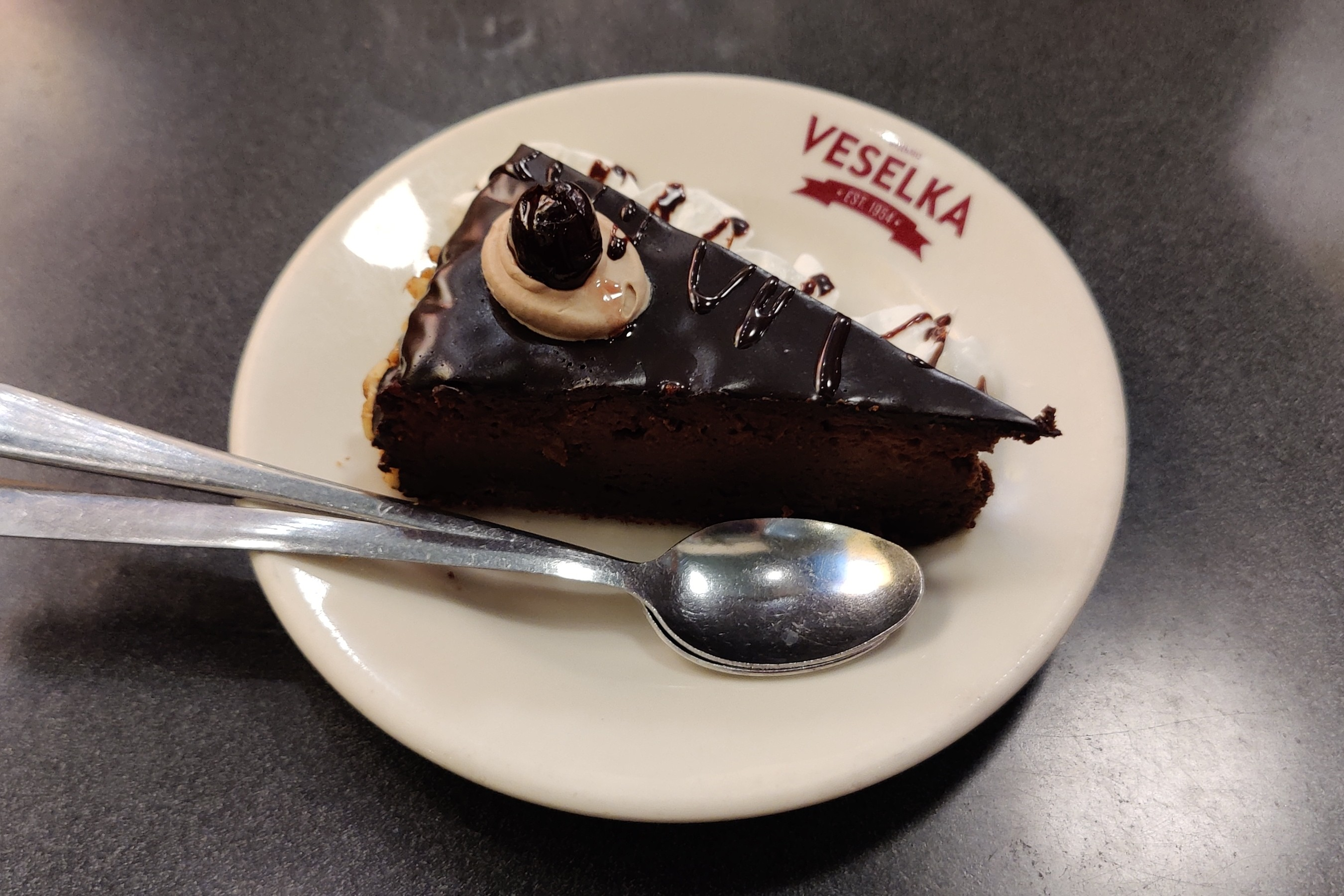
Pyana Vyshnia dessert

Veselka continues to support the needs of neighborhood residents and Eastern European immigrants: in 1994, its kitchen staff included four doctors, three from Ukraine and one from Poland, who had recently arrived in the United States. After the 2022 Russian invasion of Ukraine, Veselka's daily patronage more than doubled, from 600–700 to 1,500, as many visitors wanted to express support for Ukrainians. The restaurant was also used to coordinate donations of supplies for Ukrainian refugees. Veselka halted 24/7 operations in the early 2020s due to the COVID-19 pandemic and then reportedly due to a labor shortage. In 2024, the restaurant announced that it would resume 24-hour operation on weekends starting that July.

== Media appearances ==
=== Film and television ===
The restaurant has been used as a filming location for several films and television productions, including Trust the Man (2006), Nick and Norah's Infinite Playlist (2008), Trainwreck (2015), Ocean's 8 (2018), and the television series Billions.

Anthony Bourdain filmed an interview with publicist Danny Fields at Veselka that appeared in the final episode of Parts Unknown on CNN in 2018.

=== Music ===
Veselka is referenced in the songs "Veselka Diner" by Doctor Rokit and "Veselka" by Greta Gertler, which was featured as National Public Radio's "Song of the Day" on January 24, 2008.

=== Books ===
Veselka appears in City of Fallen Angels, the fourth novel in Cassandra Clare's The Mortal Instruments series.

Veselka is a favorite destination of the narrator in Almost Rapist: A True Crime Memoir (The Enthusiast Press)

=== Documentary ===
The restaurant appears in Chantal Akerman's 1976 documentary News From Home.

In 2024, a documentary titled Veselka: The Rainbow on the Corner at the Center of the World premiered at the Santa Barbara International Film Festival. The film was directed by Michael Fiore and narrated by David Duchovny.

== Reviews and awards ==
Reviews of Veselka in traditional press highlight its comfort food menu and describe the restaurant as a destination for late-night diners. After a renovation in 1995, The New York Times reassured regulars that the restaurant had not changed its menu. Representative awards include:

- "True Taste of New York Award" from the New York City Hospitality Alliance in 2019
- "Age Smart Employer Awards" from Columbia University's Columbia Aging Center at the Mailman School of Public Health, 2017
- "Best Comfort Food" from AOL CITY GUIDE in 2005.
- "Best Late Night Dining Award" from Time Out Magazine in 1996 and 2003.
- "Best Salad Under $10” from New York Press, 2001
- "Best East Village Diner" from New York Press, 1998 and 2000
- "Best Ukrainian Diner" from New York Press, 1999
- "Best Borscht In The City" from New York Magazine, 1997
- "Best Mushroom Barley Soup" from New York Press, 1990

== Other locations ==
=== In operation ===
Veselka Grand Central opened October 2023 in the Grand Central Terminal Dining Concourse.

=== Closed ===
Little Veselka, located in First Park, was a concession of the New York City Department of Parks and Recreation. It was operated by Veselka and offered a limited menu – primarily sandwiches named for famous Ukrainians and select others, including; Andy Warhol (the Andy Warhola), Leon Trotsky, Rinat Akhmetov, Milla Jovovich and Leonid Stadnik. It closed in 2011.

Veselka Bowery, located on East 1st Street and Bowery, was announced in February 2010 and opened in November 2011. Veselka Bowery offered a more "upscale" version of the Ukrainian comfort food that remains a staple of the menu of the original Veselka. It also offered an expansive drink menu and a selection of dozens of Eastern European vodkas. Veselka Bowery closed in April 2013.

Veselka Essex, opened in 2019, was located in The Market Line, which hosts a group of grocery stores and restaurants in commercial and residential development on the Lower East Side named Essex Crossing. In January 2024, the Essex Crossing location closed.

== See also ==
- East Village, Manhattan
- Kiev Restaurant
- List of Ukrainian restaurants
- Ukrainian Americans in New York City
