= Saint George Ukrainian Catholic Church =

Catholic church in Manhattan, New York

- Українська Католицька Церква Св. Юра
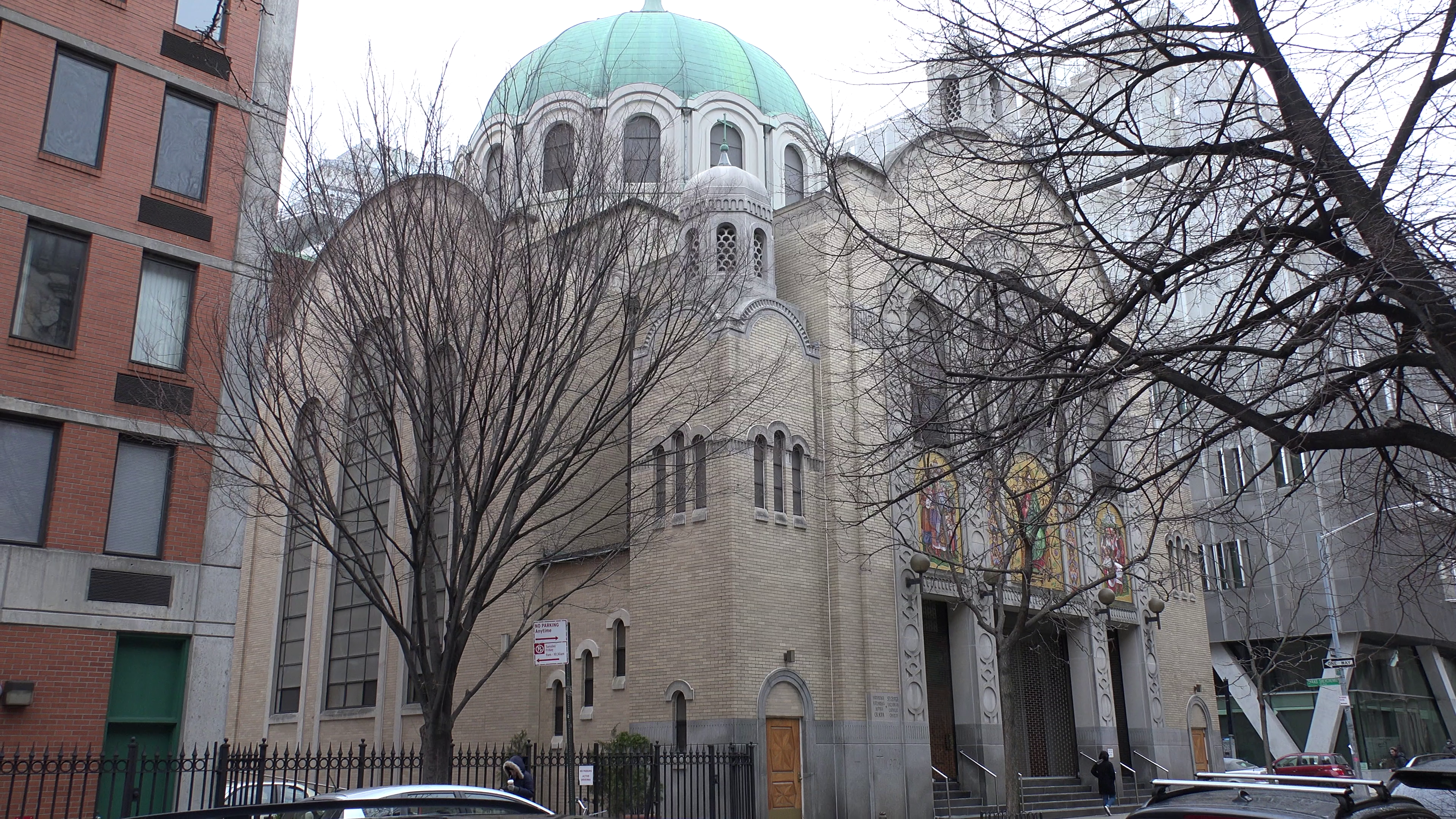
- View from East in 2016

- Location within Manhattan Location within New York City Location within New York Location within the United States
- 40°43′42″N 73°59′23″W
- Location: 6 Taras Shevchenko Place, New York City
- Country: United States
- Denomination: Catholic Church
- Sui iuris church: Ukrainian Greek Catholic Church
- Tradition: Byzantine Rite
- Website: www.stgeorgechurch.us

History
- Status: Parish church
- Founded: 1905
- Founder: Fr. Joseph Chaplinsky
- Consecrated: April 23, 1978 (present church)
- Events: 1905 — Parish founded at the formerly Baptist Colgate Chapel at 332 East 20th Street in 1905; 1911 — Parish moves into the former Seventh Street Methodist Episcopal Church at 22–28 East 7th Street; 1958 — Adjoining Catholic school building is constructed for K-12 education; 1978 — Present church opens for services next door to "old church"; 1991 — Residential building housing new rectory is completed on former lot of "old church"

Architecture
- Functional status: Active
- Architect: Apollinaire Osadca
- Architectural type: Byzantine Revival
- Style: Cathedral
- Years built: 1976–2008
- Groundbreaking: 1976
- Completed: 1978
- Construction cost: $2,500,000

Specifications
- Capacity: 1,000

Administration
- Province: Ukrainian Catholic Archeparchy of Philadelphia
- Diocese: Ukrainian Catholic Eparchy of Stamford

Clergy
- Archbishop: The Most Reverend, Stefan Soroka
- Bishop(s): Paul Chomnycky, O.S.B.M.
- Priest(s): Illya Bronovskyy, O.S.B.M.
- Pastor(s): Emilian Dorosh, O.S.B.M.

Saint George Ukrainian Catholic Church (Ukrainian: Украї́нська Католи́цька Це́рква Св. Ю́ра, romanized: Ukraḯnsʹka Katolýtsʹka Tsérkva Sv. Yúra, pronounced [ʊkrɐˈjinʲsʲkɐ kɐtoˈlɪtsʲkɐ ˈtsɛrkwɐ sʲwʲɐˈtɔɦo ˈjurɐ]) is a Ukrainian Greek Catholic Church located in East Village, Manhattan, New York City, at 7th Street and Taras Shevchenko Place. The church and the adjoining St. George Academy are encircled by, but not included in, the East Village Historic District. For over 100 years, this Ukrainian parish has served as a spiritual, political and cultural epicenter for several waves of Ukrainian Americans in New York City.

== Earlier buildings ==
The first Ukrainian rite liturgy in the city of New York was performed only a few blocks away from today's St. George Ukrainian Catholic Church, in the basement of St. Brigid's Roman Catholic Church on the southeast corner of East 8th Street and Avenue B. In 1905, the growing Ukrainian American community was able to purchase the Colgate Chapel from the First Swedish Baptist Church at 332 East 20th Street; the former Baptist Tabernacle would be converted to accommodate a layout for Byzantine style services and was dedicated to Saint George. By 1911, the congregation had grown to the extent that a larger building was needed, and the parish proceeded to purchase the Seventh Street Methodist Episcopal Church, also known as the Bowery Village Church.

The Bowery Village Church was originally built in the 1840s to serve an immigrant population in Little Germany, which had rapidly declined after the General Slocum steamboat fire resulted in the tragic loss of over 1,000 German Americans in 1904. After its purchase by the Ukrainian community, it too was adapted to accommodate Byzantine-Slav services. Later referred to as the "Old Church" by the new Ukrainian Catholic owners, the AIA Guide to New York City (Revised Edition 1978) described the new home of St. George parish as "a Greek Revival temple in stucco, with a mini-onion dome." The AIA regretted the "domed symbol of the parish's wealth and burgeoning membership: Miami Beach on 7th Street replaces the real Greek Revival thing." The AIA Guide (Fifth Edition, 2010) clarified that that church was built in 1840 and demolished in 1976 "to provide off-street parking for the congregation's new building next door."

== Present church ==
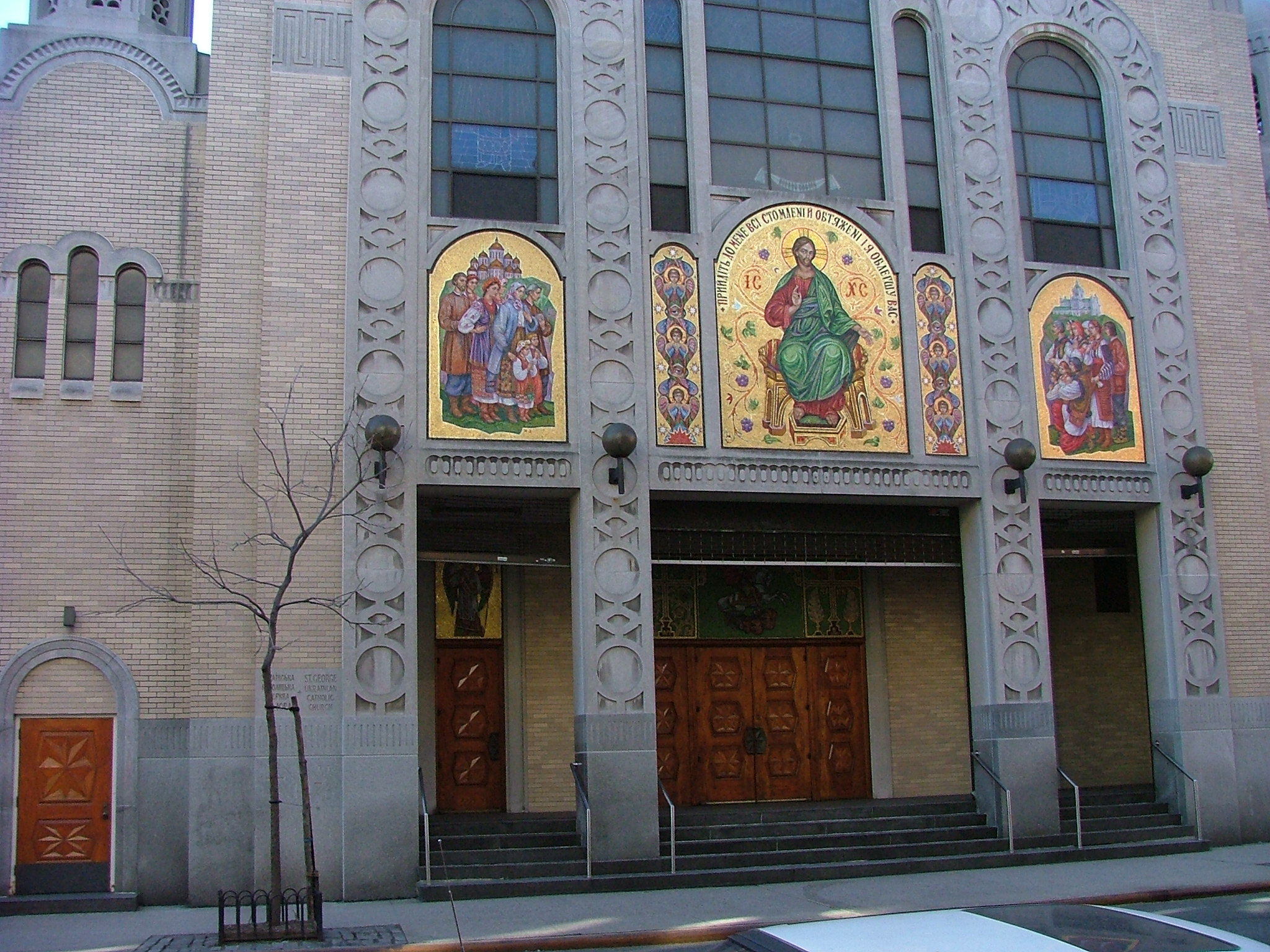
North side

The building currently inhabited by the parish of St. George was built between 1976 and 1978 to designs by architect Apollinaire Osadca. Prior to construction, Mr. Osadca touted his designs as "based on ancient Ukrainian Byzantine style, which survived in Ukraine, despite western European trends."

From 1980 until his death in 2012, Andrij Dobriansky, a principal artist with the Metropolitan Opera, was the liturgical cantor as well as the director of the Andrey Sheptytsky choir at Saint George Ukrainian Catholic Church. In 2016, his legacy of Ukrainian liturgical singing at the church was documented by his children on the PBS series Bare Feet in NYC.

== See also ==
- St. George's Episcopal Church (Manhattan)
- St. George's Church (Flushing, New York)
