= FRCH Design Worldwide =

American architectural and design firm

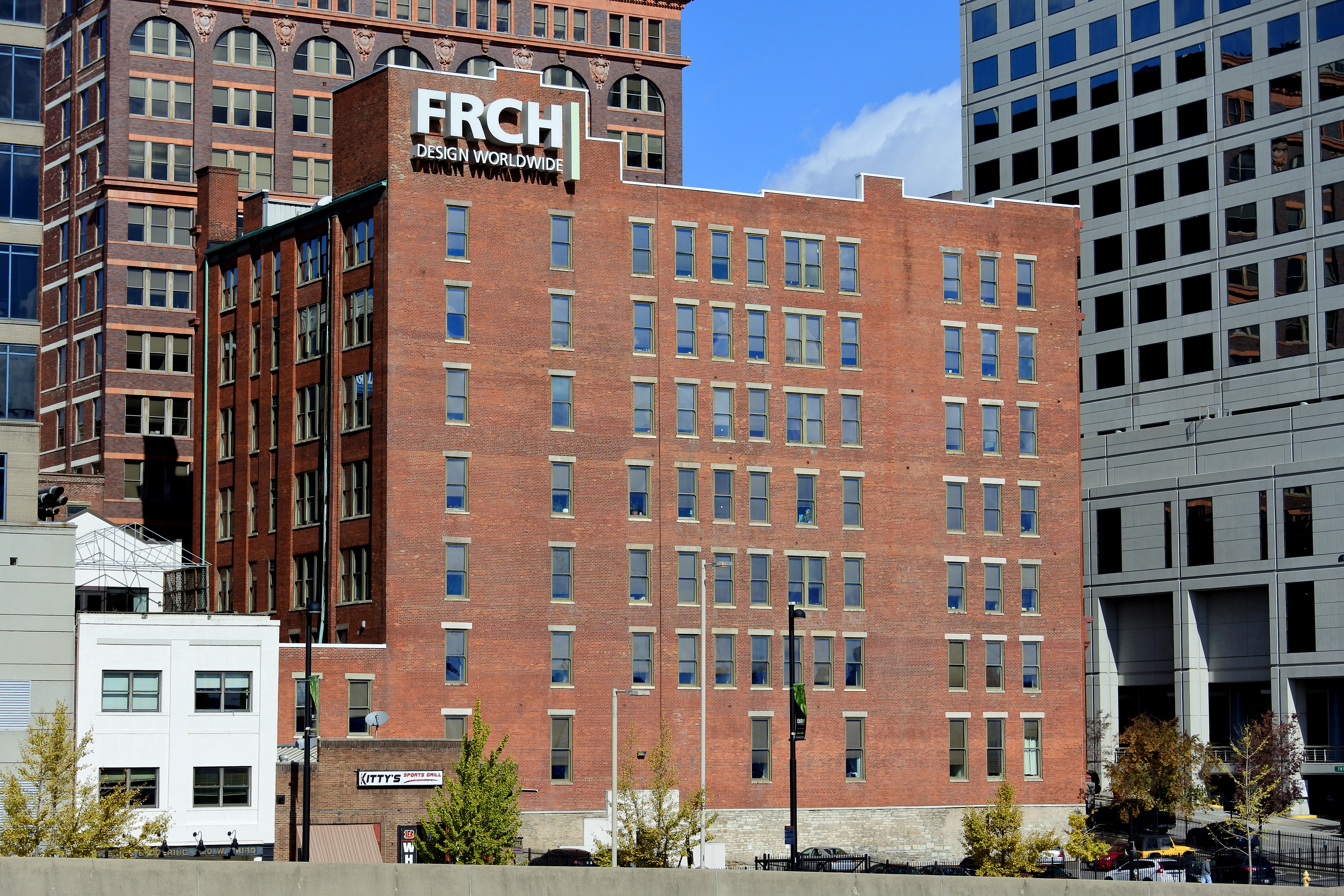
- Corporate headquarters in Downtown Cincinnati

Practice information
- Founders: James T. Fitzgerald, Kevin Roche, Joseph Cicio, Ed Hambrecht
- Founded: 1968
- No. of employees: 200+
- Location: Cincinnati, Ohio, U.S. (Additional offices in Los Angeles and New York City)
- Coordinates: 39.098680°N 84.515890°W

Website
- frch.com

FRCH Design Worldwide was an American architectural and design firm headquartered in Cincinnati, Ohio, with regional offices in Los Angeles and New York City. Founded in 1968, it provided architectural, interior design, graphic design and brand strategy services to the retail, hospitality, restaurant and corporate office sectors.

In January 2018, it formally merged with NELSON Worldwide and has since re-branded its operations under the "FRCH Nelson" brand.

== History ==
FRCH was founded by James T. Fitzgerald FAIA in 1968 as James T. Fitzgerald/Interior Architecture (F/IA). The practice largely focused on the interior design of large corporate spaces as Fitzgerald believed interiors were largely ignored by architects at the time. F/IA changed its name to Space Design/Interior Architecture (SDI) following the acquisition of a local competitor in 1972. In 1978, the company secured its first international project, a Hilton hotel in La Paz, Bolivia.

In 1990, the firm merged with New York-based architecture firm Hambrecht Terrell International, becoming HTI/SDI with offices in New York and Cincinnati. The new entity grew to become one of the most prestigious retail design companies worldwide with clients such as Bloomingdale's, Saks Fifth Avenue, Macy's, Marshall Field's, Neiman Marcus and Selfridges.

In 1995, the firm appointed retail executive Joseph Cicio as vice-chairman and chief creative officer, and as part of a major restructuring plan, HTI/SDI changed to its present name of FRCH Design Worldwide representing the key partners of the firm: James T. Fitzgerald, Kevin Roche, Joseph Cicio and Ed Hambrecht.

Following its corporate restructuring, FRCH expanded to the international market, offering architectural and design services to international retailers in Brazil and Mexico. In 2011, the firm collaborated with renowned Mexican architect Michel Rojkind in the interior design of the new Liverpool Interlomas in Greater Mexico City.

In 2015, FRCH opened a new office in Los Angeles.

In 2016, the firm developed the design concept and brand strategy of Home2 Suites, an extended stay hotel brand of Hilton Worldwide and in 2017, it developed the prototype design, branding and graphic design for Hilton's new brand Tru by Hilton, directly targeting at younger and more budget-conscious travelers.

FRCH grew to become a leading architecture firm in the retail and hospitality sectors by expanding its portfolio to include clients such as American Girl, Darden Restaurants, Hilton Worldwide, Hyatt, Kroger, Liverpool, Subway, T-Mobile and Tiffany & Co. In 2017 Interior Design Magazine mentioned FRCH as one of the top hospitality architecture firms for and in 2018, FRCH was named Design Firm of the Year by design:retail magazine.

In 2018, it was announced that FRCH would merge operations with NELSON Worldwide, a large architecture and interior design based in Philadelphia.

== Selected projects ==
- Home2 Suites by Hilton: Interior/exterior concept and graphic design.
- Tru by Hilton: Concept development, graphic design, interior design, and branding
- Liverpool Interlomas: Interior design.
- Great American Tower at Queen City Square: Ground floor lobby interiors.
- Fifth Third Bank: Corporate headquarters renovation in Fountain Square.
- Southern facade of the Kenwood Towne Center Shopping Mall in Cincinnati.
