= Zahner (surname) =

Zahner is a surname. Notable people with the surname include:

- Fred Zahner (1870–1900), American professional baseball catcher
- L. William Zahner (born 1955), American president and CEO of Zahner Company
- Lee Zahner (born 1974), American volleyball player
- Ruedi Zahner (born 1957), Swiss footballer
- Simon Zahner (born 1983), Swiss cyclist
- Sam Zahner (born 1996), American freestyle skier

== See also ==
- Zahner, is an architectural metal & glass company located in Kansas City, Missouri
