= Corporation Food Hall =

Food hall in Downtown Los Angeles, California

- Location: Downtown Los Angeles, California
- Coordinates: 34.04384151808747°N 118.25263871789045°W
- Address: 724 S. Spring Street
- Opened: August 2017; 9 years ago
- Num. of stores: 9
- Floors: 1
- Website: www.corporationfoodhall.com

Corporation Food Hall is a food hall located in the Historic Core of Downtown Los Angeles, on Spring Street. Corporation Food Hall opened in August 2017. The food hall is located on the ground floor of the historic Corporation Building which was first built in 1915, and houses nine food stalls.

== See also ==
- Food hall
- Downtown Los Angeles, California
