= Mercado Roma =

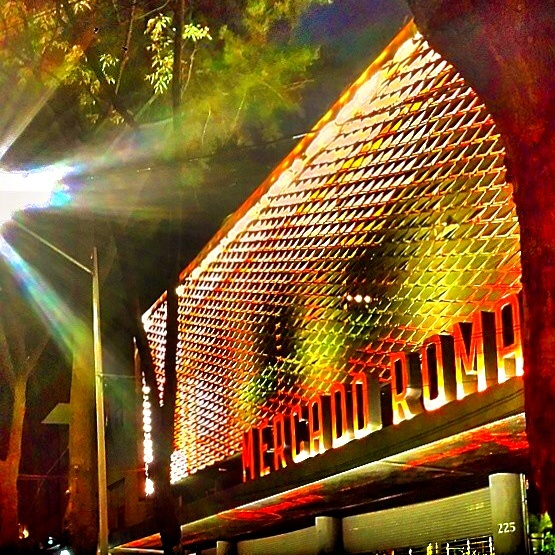
- Entrance to Mercado Roma at night
- Location in Mexico City

General information
- Coordinates: 19.4140913°N 99.1645707°W

Design and construction
- Architect: Rojkind Arquitectos

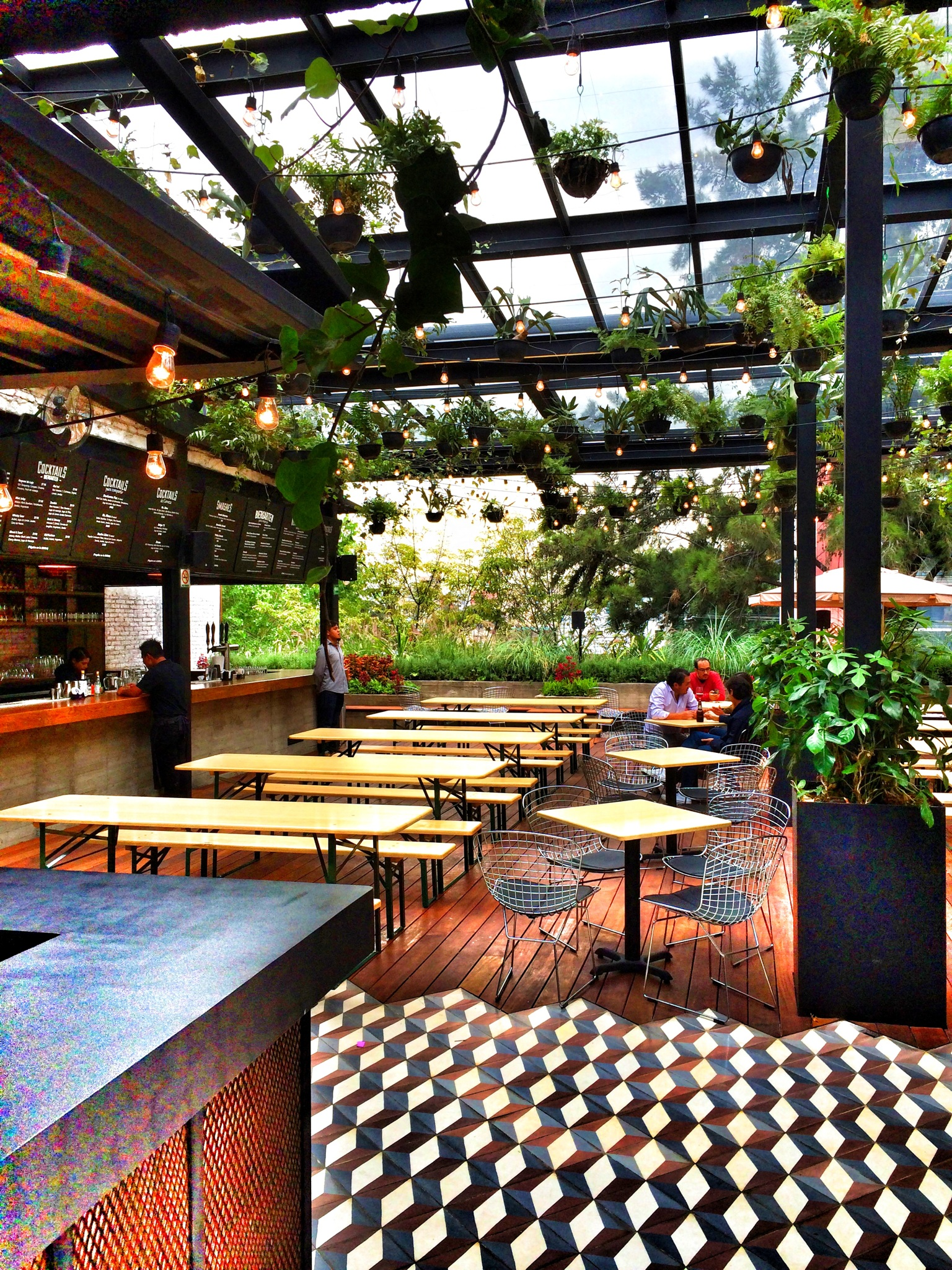
Biergarten on roof of Mercado Roma

Mercado Roma ("Roma market") is a public market in the format of a gourmet food hall located on Querétaro street in the Colonia Roma Norte neighborhood of Mexico City. The market stalls offer organic and other food products for sale; stands and counters where visitors can eat a variety of cuisines (pozole, tacos, tapas, hamburgers). Some of the stands are from restaurants or shops well known outside the market, such as Que Bo! chocolates, Azul Mexican food and Butcher's hamburgers.
