= Home2 Suites by Hilton =

All-suite extended-stay hotel chain run by Hilton

- Type: Subsidiary
- Industry: Extended Stay Hotel
- Founded: 2009; 17 years ago
- Founder: Hilton Hotels Corporation
- Headquarters: Memphis, Tennessee, United States
- Number of locations: 748 (as of July 2, 2025)
- Area served: United States, Canada, China, Republic of Ireland
- Key people: Bill Duncan (Global Head)
- Parent: Hilton Worldwide
- Website: home2suites.com

Home2 Suites by Hilton is an American all-suite extended-stay hotel featuring contemporary accommodations and customizable guest room design. It competes with TownePlace Suites by Marriott and InterContinental Hotels Group's Candlewood Suites. The Memphis, Tennessee-originated hotel brand targets both business and leisure travelers. Launched in January 2009, Home2 Suites by Hilton was the first new brand introduced by Hilton Worldwide in 20 years. As of December 2019, it has 384 properties with 40,373 rooms in two countries and territories, including three that are managed with 313 rooms and 381 that are franchised with 40,060 rooms.

A Home2 Suites by Hilton in Concord, North Carolina

== History ==
Home2 Suites by Hilton opened its first property in Fayetteville, North Carolina in February 2011. It opened its 50th hotel in 2015.

In June 2020, Hilton has signed an exclusive management license agreement with Country Garden's Fanyard Hotels to introduce and develop the Home2 Suites by Hilton brand in China and planned to build more than 1,000 Home2 Suites in China.

== Design and construction ==
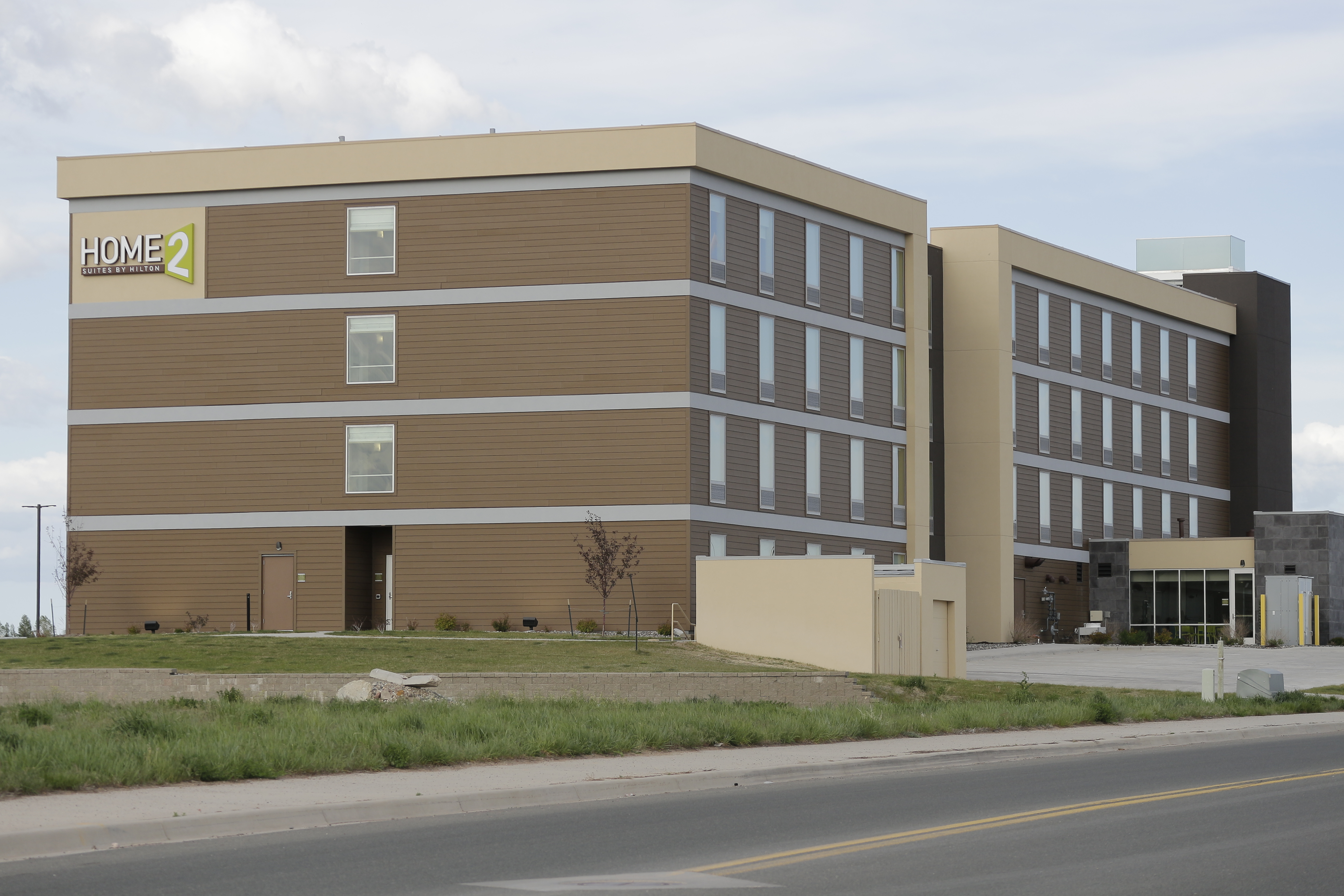
Home2 Suites by Hilton in Gillette, Wyoming

Home2 Suites interiors and exteriors were originally designed by Cincinnati-based design, architecture and brand strategy firm FRCH Design Worldwide. The majority of Home2 Suites hotels will be new constructions and follow a standard layout and design model. Properties are constructed in less than one year and usually feature 108 suites, 56,658 total square feet of property, 4,200 square feet (390 m^{2}) of community space, 323-square-foot (30.0 m^{2}) studios, 490-square-foot (46 m^{2}) one-bedroom suites, a four-story wood-frame construction and a building footprint of under 2 acres (8,100 m^{2}).
