= Los Angeles Police Department Memorial for Fallen Officers =

LAPD Memorial to Fallen Officers
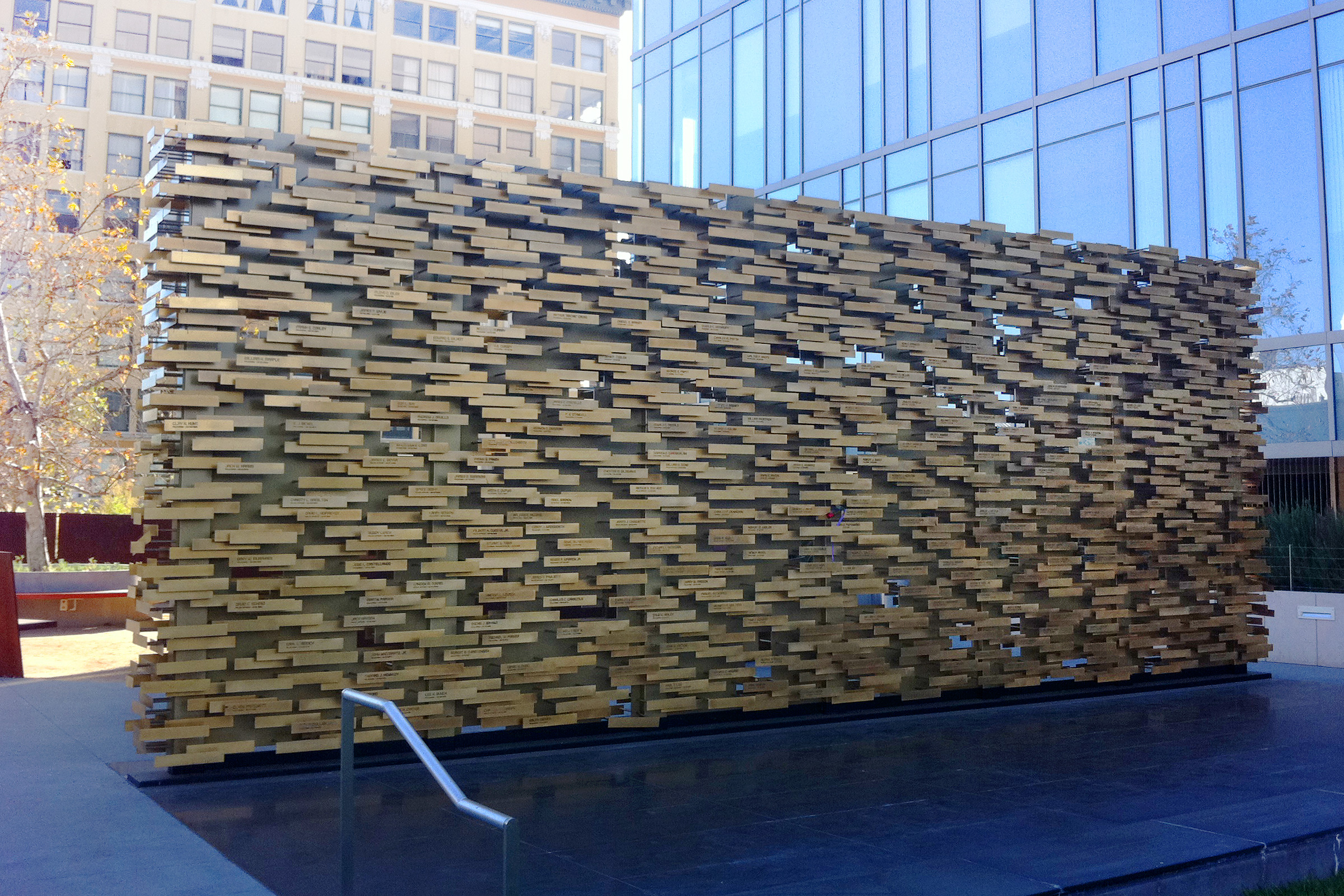
- Interactive map of LAPD Memorial to Fallen Officers
- Location: Los Angeles, California
- Coordinates: 34.051588°N 118.244306°W
- Designer: Gensler
- Material: Brass Alloy (Muntz Metal)
- Length: 32'
- Height: 12'-3"
- Opening date: October 14, 2009
- Dedicated to: Los Angeles Police Department Fallen Officers

The Los Angeles Police Department Memorial to Fallen Officers is a monument on an elevated plaza at the LAPD headquarters on 100 West 1st Street in downtown Los Angeles. The memorial was funded by the Los Angeles Police Foundation, who raised the $750,000 through private donations. The original tribute to fallen officers that was located at the previous headquarters at Parker Center was destroyed in the process of transport when moved to make room for a new jail.

== Design ==
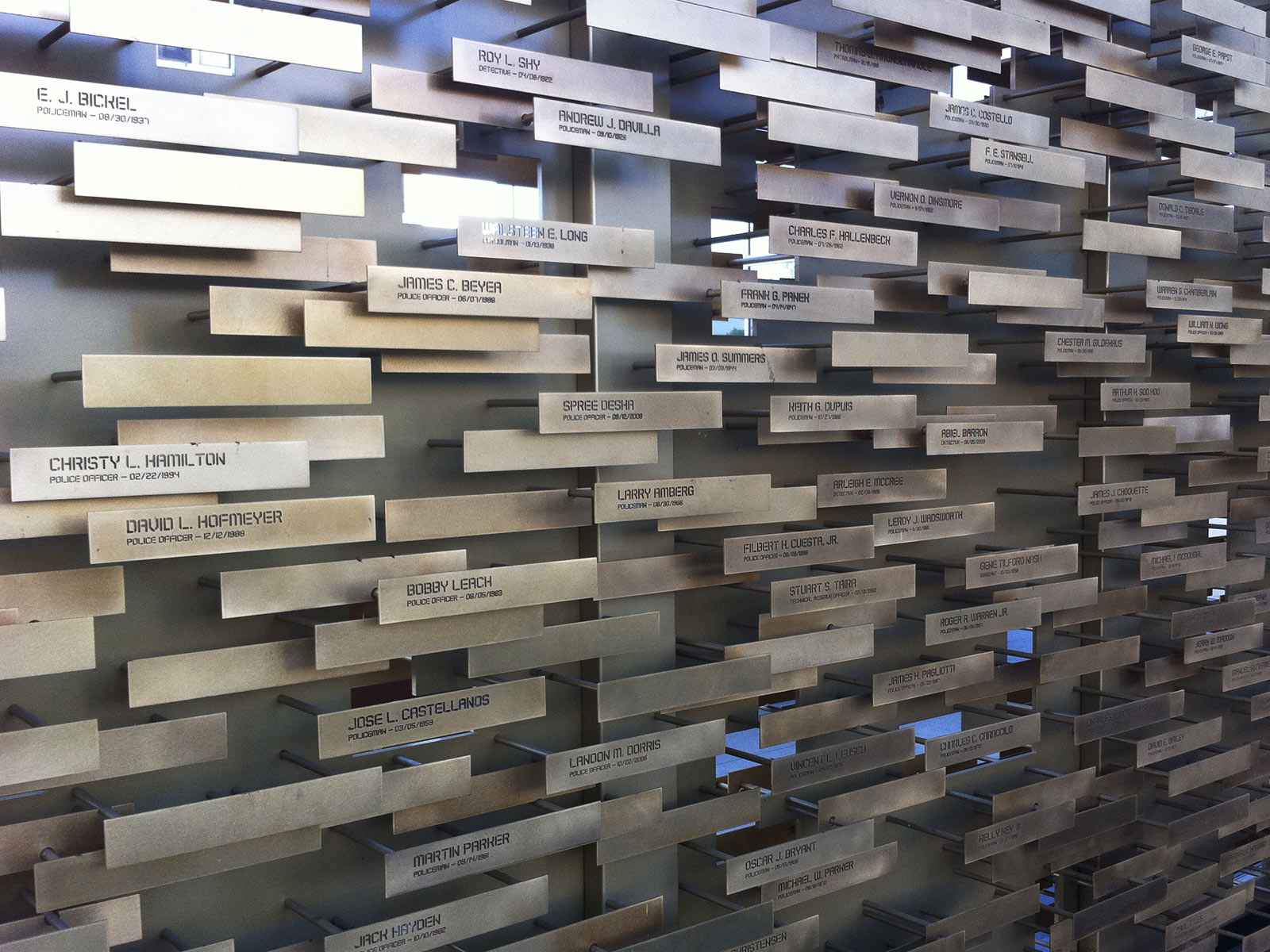
Detail of the memorial wall; each plaque is water-jet cut with the names of fallen police officers.

The memorial wall is designed by a team led by Robert Jernigan of Gensler, whose time was donated for the project. The wall is made up of more than two-thousand brass alloy plaques, two-hundred-two of which are inscribed with the names of fallen police officers. From a distance the memorial appears as a solid wall of lit brass. As visitors approach, it becomes evident that the wall is in fact a vast assemblage of discrete, engraved brass plates, seemingly suspended in air and light. This form dynamically honors the LAPD both as a collective whose duty is to protect the public, and as individuals whose role is to serve the public. The brass alloy is a reference to police officers' badges.

== Construction ==
The construction was managed by Tudor Saliba, and produced and fabricated by Zahner in Kansas City. September 18, 2010, the project was packed and shipped to Los Angeles. Kansas City Police Officers escorted the memorial from Zahner out of the city as a show of support for fellow officers.

As officers fall in the line of duty, blank brass panels are removed from the memorial and shipped to Zahner. The company water jet cuts the officer's name and ships it back to be installed on the memorial as a donated service to the Los Angeles Police Foundation.

== Dedication ==
On October 14, 2009, the project was dedicated. The Police command, relatives of fallen officers, elected officials and donors gathered to dedicate the memorial wall.
