= Liverpool Interlomas =

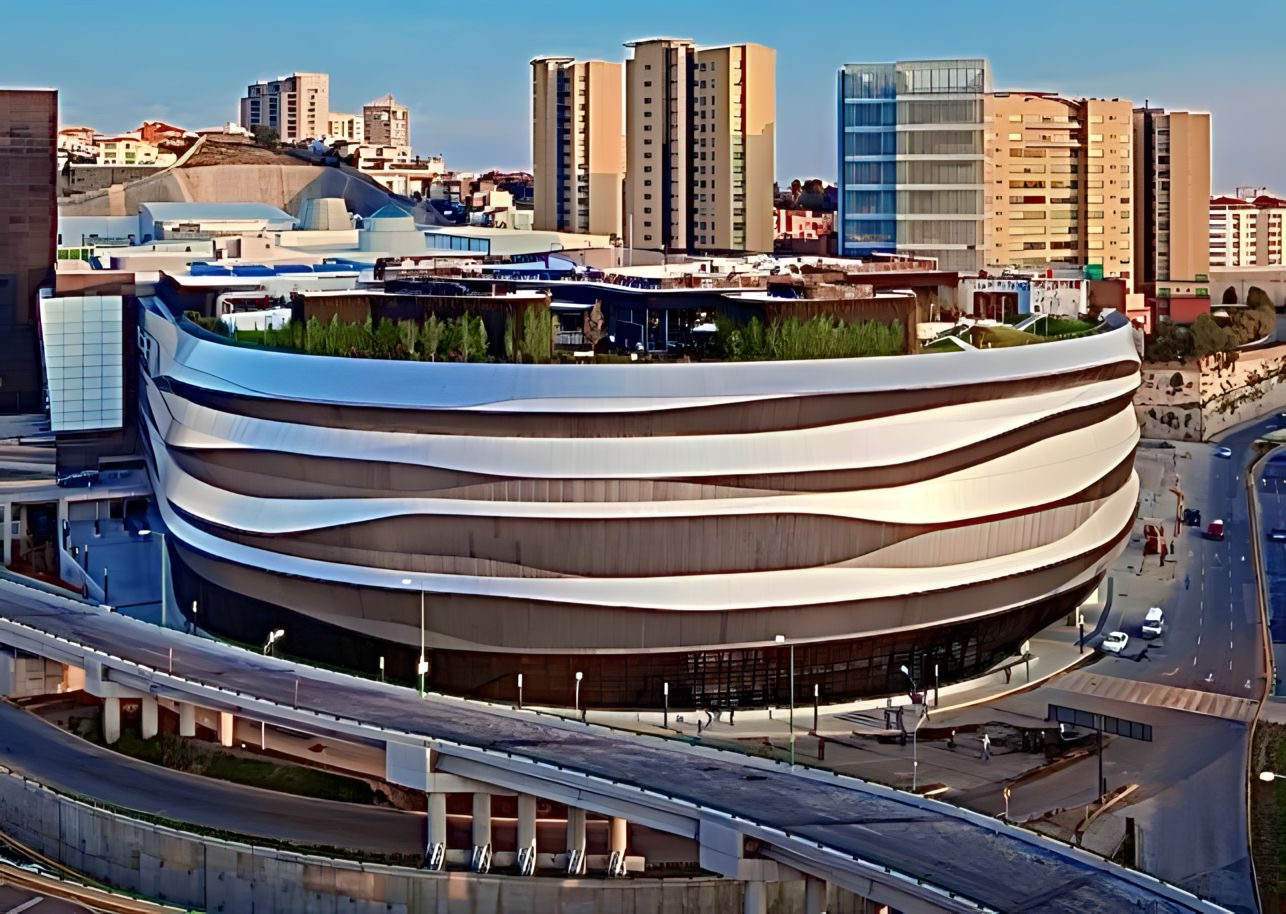
- Photograph of the Liverpool Interlomas Flagship Store.
- Interactive map of the Liverpool Interlomas area
- Alternative names: El OVNI ("the UFO", nickname)

General information
- Location: Vialidad de la Barranca 6, colonia Ex-Hacienda Jesús del Monte, Interlomas, Huixquilucan, State of Mexico, Mexico (Greater Mexico City)
- Coordinates: 19.396394°N 99.281131°W
- Opening: 2011
- Owner: Liverpool

Technical details
- Floor count: 4 (including sub-level)
- Floor area: total: 30,000 m^{2} (323,000 sq ft)

Design and construction
- Architect: Rojkind Arquitectos

Website
- www.liverpool.com.mx

Liverpool Interlomas is a branch of the Liverpool department store chain in the Paseo Interlomas shopping mall, in the Interlomas neighborhood of Huixquilucan, Greater Mexico City. The structure was designed by Rojkind Arquitectos. The building also houses a 16-screen Cinepolis cinema, an ice rink, 12 restaurants and a food court with 180 vendors.

The building gained the nickname "El OVNI" (the UFO) for its shape.

== Design and construction ==
Rojkind Arquitects designed the building from July to December, 2010, and the building was constructed from March to October 2011. The above-ground three stories are clad in a double-layered stainless steel surface fabricated by Zahner. The 30,000m2 department store includes a rooftop recreational park where friends, families, and pets are welcome. Several design firms were involved in various aspects of the project. The interiors were done by Cincinnati-based FRCH Design Worldwide, the rooftop garden by Thomas Balsley and the gourmet space by JHP Design.
