= Zahner =

Business

- Industry: Architecture, Art, Metal, Glass
- Founded: 1897, 129 years ago.
- Headquarters: Kansas City, United States
- Key people: L. William Zahner, President.
- Number of employees: 200 (12-31-2009)
- Website: azahner.com

Zahner or A. Zahner Company is an architectural metal & glass company located in Kansas City, Missouri.

== History and company information ==
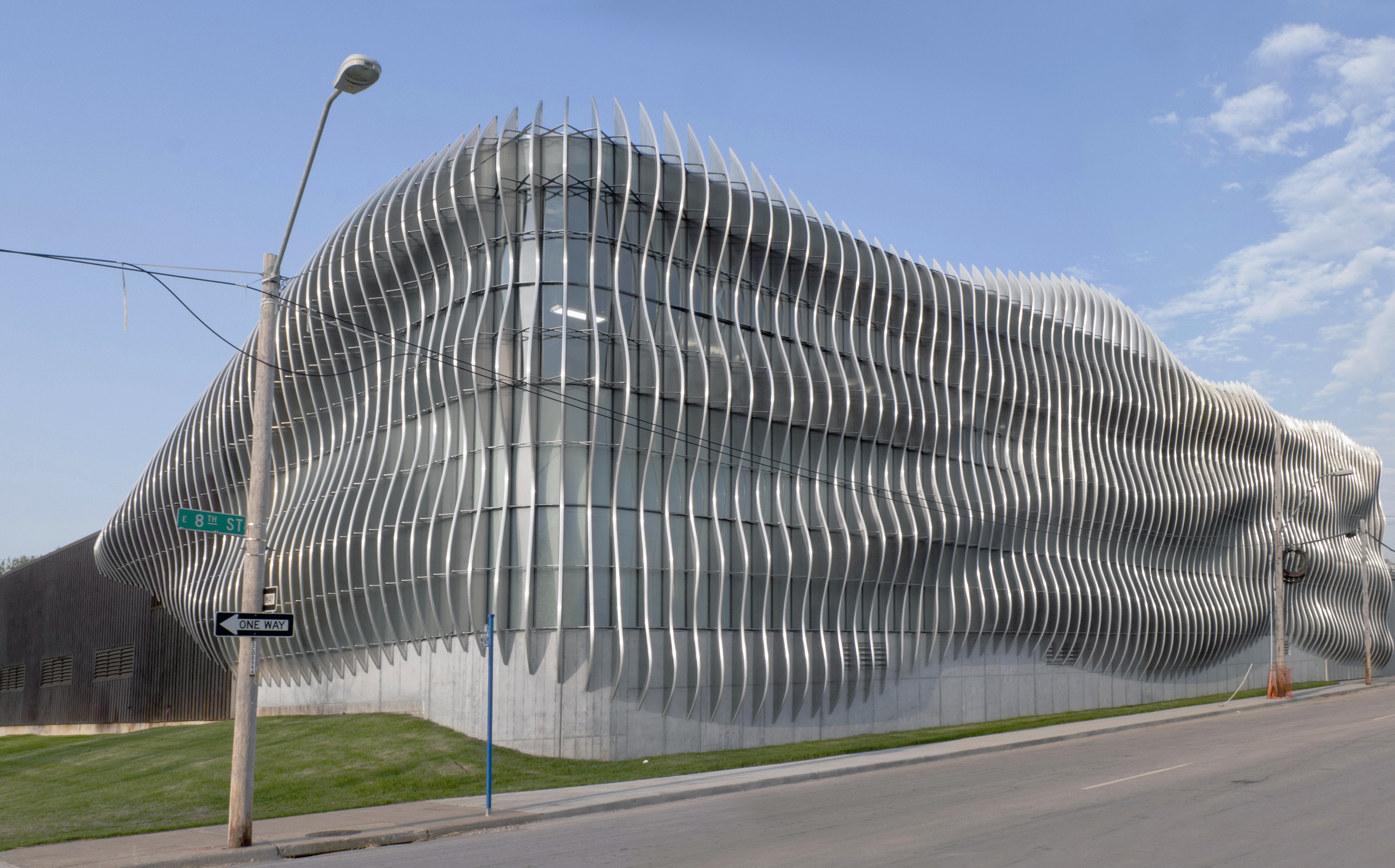
Zahner Headquarters in Kansas City.

Zahner was founded in 1897 by Andrew Zahner as Eagle Cornice Works, serving the region with decorative cornice works and repair. In 1913, the company became A. Zahner Sheet Metal Company, and over the course of the century would produce metal-work from industrial kitchen tables to metal work on buildings. In 1989, Andrew Zahner's great-grandson, L. William Zahner III became company president, and is credited with transforming the company from a regional sheet-metal contractor into a national architectural metals and facades producer. He also guided the company towards producing works by artists as well as architects.

During the past thirty years, the company produced the exteriors for notable structures including the de Young Museum in San Francisco, California, the Experience Music Project in Seattle, Washington, and is producing the upcoming National September 11 Memorial & Museum in New York City. The firm is involved in the development of architectural metal systems as well as patinas and other surface treatments on metal.

Zahner holds five patents which pertain to the Architectural Metals industry Zahner President and CEO L. William Zahner serves as the Industry Liaison for the National Architectural Committee of SMACNA, and in 2006, was awarded the Copper Medal, Associazone Italiana di Metallurgia (AIM).

On January 21, 2011, companies Zahner and KME announced a joint venture, Zahner-KME. The venture will offer engineering and building services to architects in the European Market.

On December 3, 2024 Armstrong World Industries announced that it has acquired A. Zahner Company.

== Notable architectural projects ==
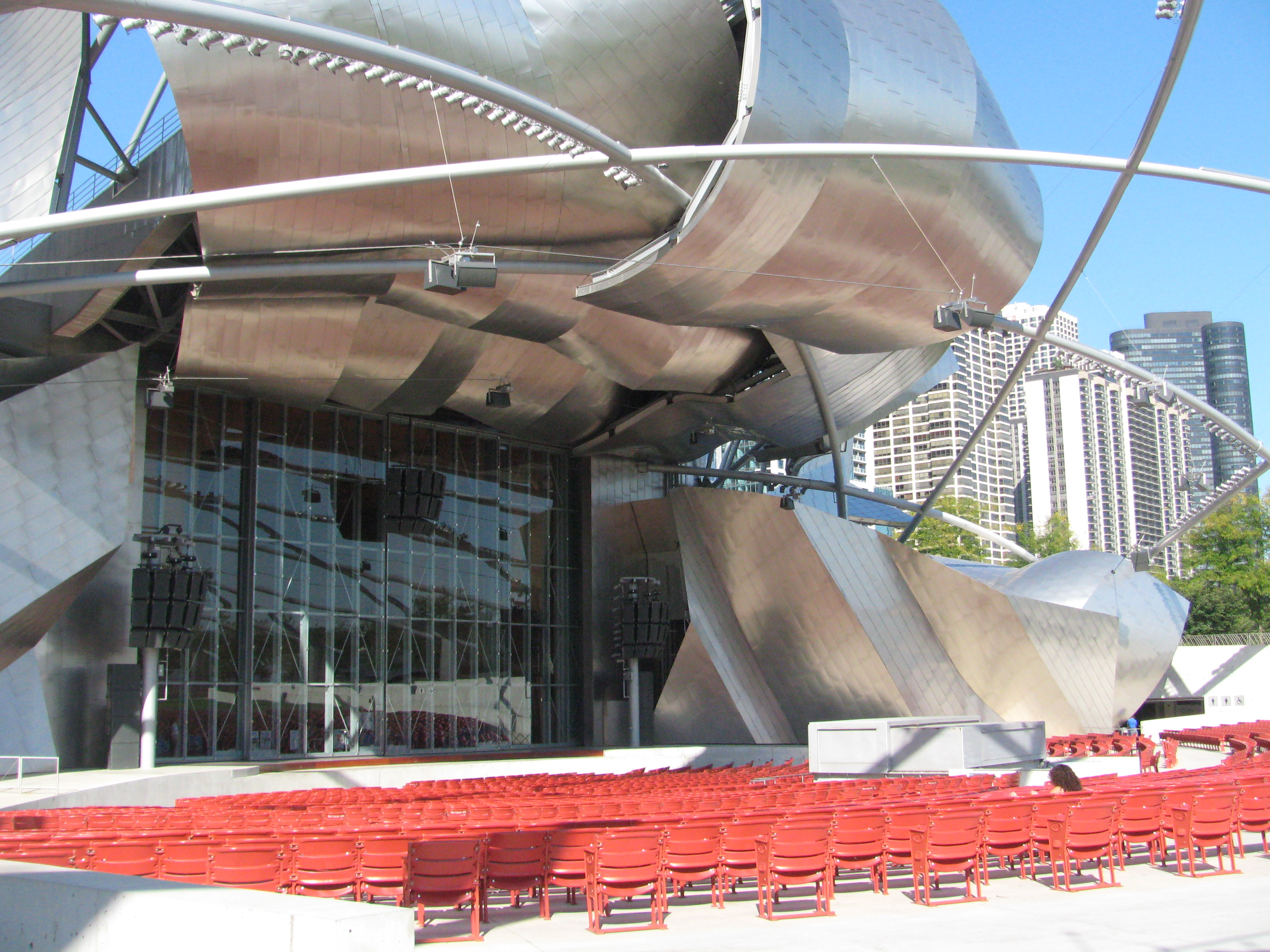
Frank Gehry's Pritzker Pavilion.

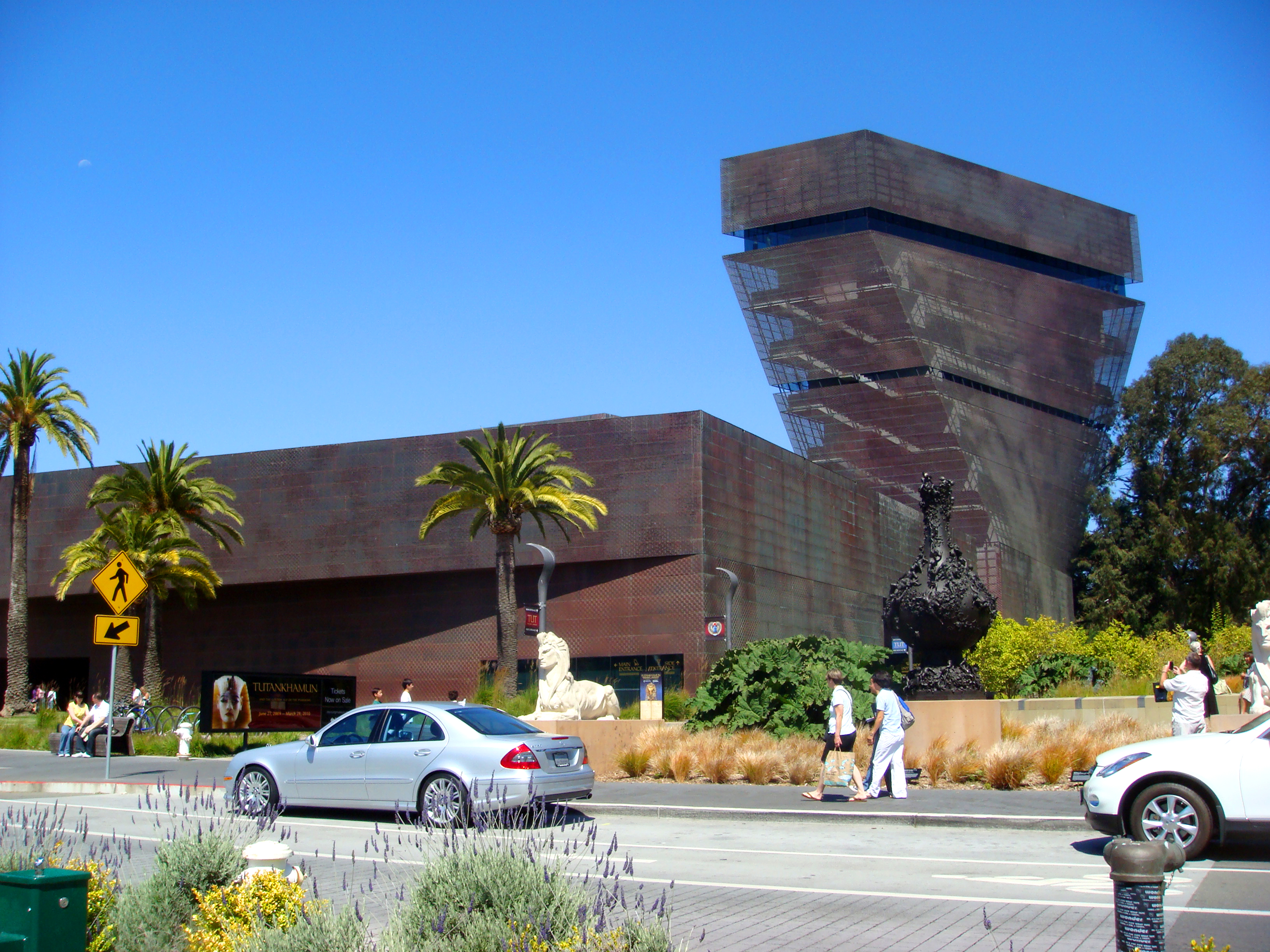
De Young Museum in San Francisco, designed by Herzog & de Meuron.

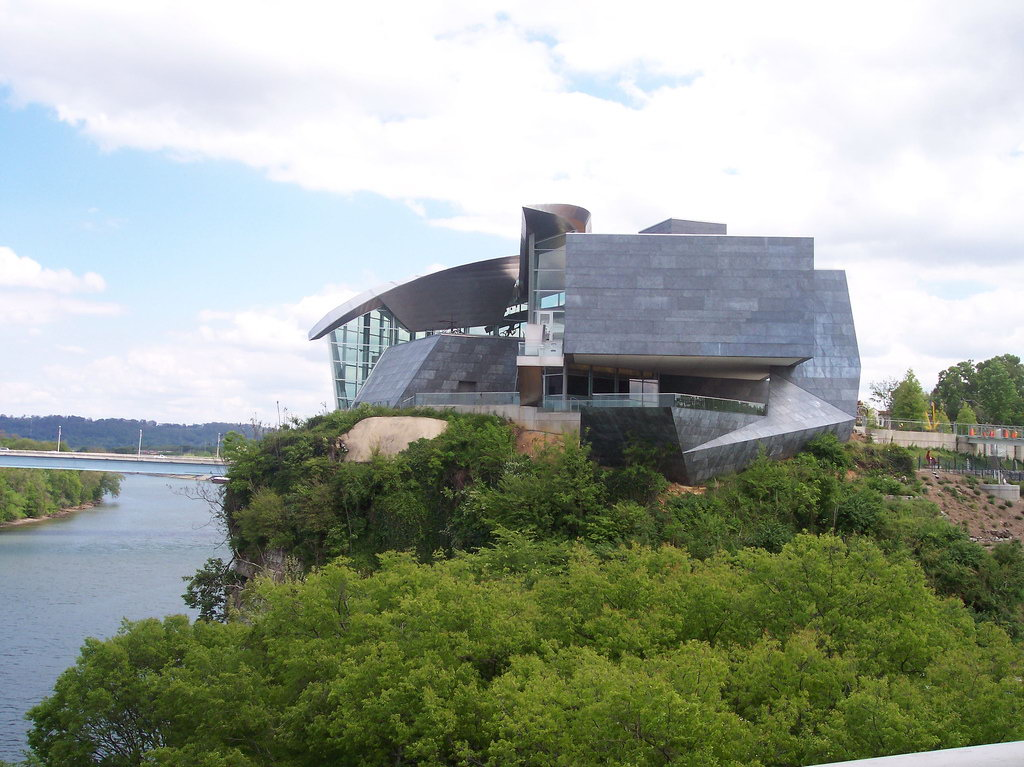
Photo of the Hunter Museum of American Art, designed by Randall Stout.

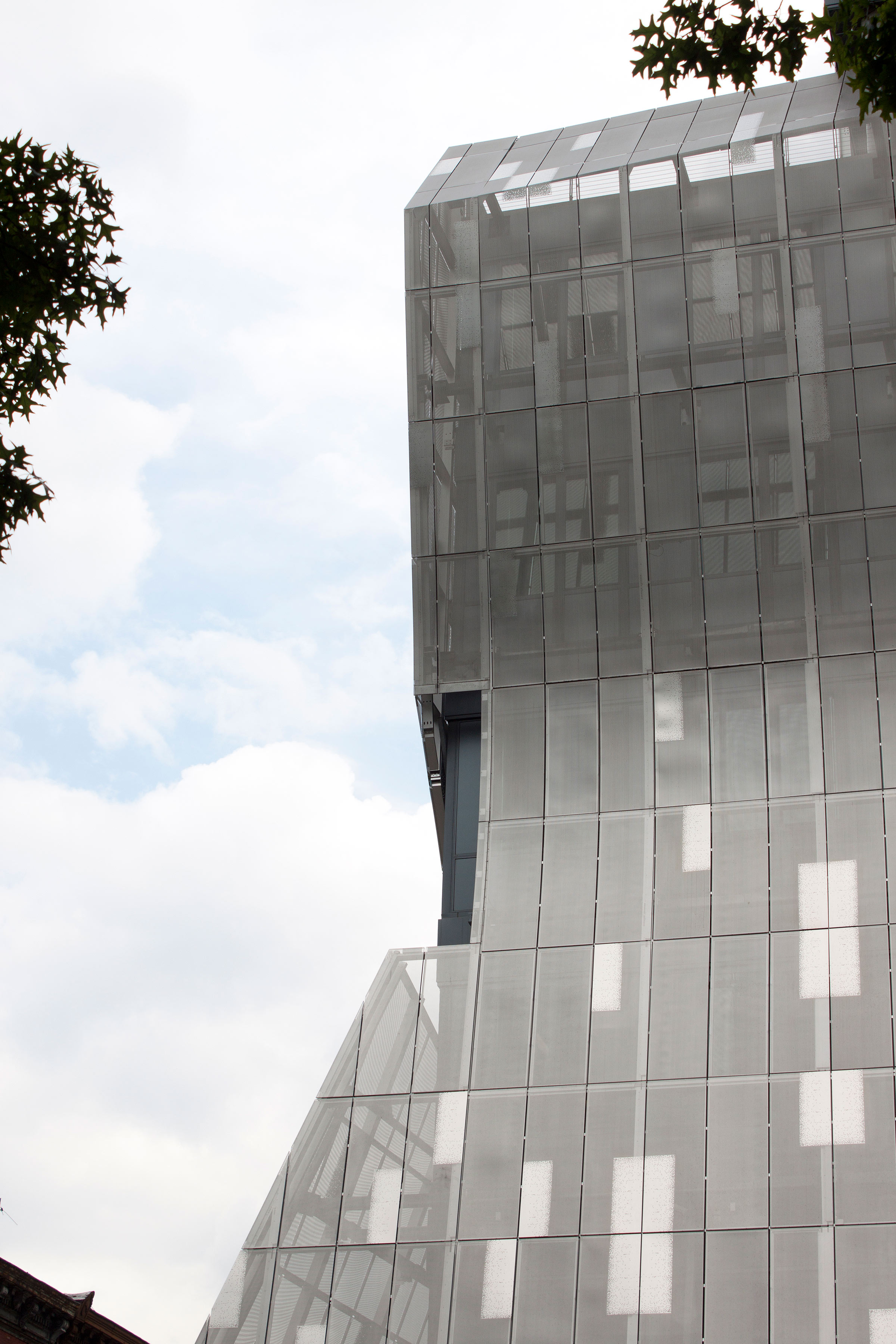
Detail of 41 Cooper Square designed by Morphosis.

- American Heritage Center, in Laramie, Wyoming, designed by Antoine Predock, 1993.
- Weisman Art Museum, in Minneapolis, Minnesota, designed by Frank Gehry, 1993.
- Independence Temple, in Independence, Missouri, designed by Gyo Obata, 1994.
- Museum of Science & Industry, in Tampa, Florida, designed by Antoine Predock, 1995.
- Maggie's Center, in Dundee, Scotland, designed by Frank Gehry, 1995.
- Experience Music Project, in Seattle, Washington, designed by Frank Gehry, 2000.
- Museum of Glass, in Tacoma, Washington, designed by Arthur Erickson, 2002.
- Flagship Apple Store in Soho, New York City, designed by Bohlin Cywinski Jackson, 2002.
- Robert Hoag Rawlings Public Library, in Pueblo, Colorado, designed by Antoine Predock, 2003.
- Tacoma Art Museum, in Tacoma, Washington, designed by Antoine Predock, 2003.
- Pritzker Pavilion, in Chicago's Millennium Park, Illinois, designed by Frank Gehry, 2004.
- DFW Airport Terminal D, in Irving, Texas. Designed by Corgan Associates, 2005.
- Turbulence House, New Mexico, designed by Steven Holl, 2005.
- De Young Museum, in San Francisco's Golden Gate Park, California, designed by Herzog & de Meuron, 2005.
- Hunter Museum of American Art, in Chattanooga, Tennessee, designed by Randall Stout, 2005.
- 40 Bond, a residential project in New York, New York, designed by Herzog & de Meuron, 2006.
- Wayne L. Morse United States Courthouse, Eugene, Oregon, designed by Morphosis, 2006.
- Contemporary Jewish Museum, in San Francisco's Yerba Buena Gardens district, designed by Daniel Libeskind, 2008.
- Trinity River Audubon Center, in Dallas, Texas, designed by Antoine Predock, 2008.
- BOK Center, in Tulsa, Oklahoma, designed by Cesar Pelli, 2008.
- Taubman Museum of Art, in Roanoke, Virginia, designed by Randall Stout, 2008.
- 41 Cooper Square, The New Academic Building at Cooper Union, New York, New York, designed by Morphosis, 2009.
- Winspear Opera House, in Dallas, Texas, designed by Foster and Partners, 2009.
- Wyly Theater, in Dallas, Texas, designed by OMA/REX.
- Art Gallery of Alberta, Edmonton, Alberta, designed by Randall Stout, 2010.
- NASCAR Hall of Fame, Charlotte, North Carolina, designed by Pei Cobb Freed, 2010.
- Irving Convention Center at Las Colinas, in Irving, Texas, designed by RMJM Hillier, 2011.
- Zahner North Dock Expansion, in Kansas City, Missouri, designed by Crawford Architects, 2011.
- Kauffman Center for the Performing Arts, in Kansas City, Missouri, designed by Moshe Safdie, 2011.
- Dream Downtown, in New York City, designed by Handel Architects, 2011.
- Miami Intermodal Center, in Miami, Florida, designed by Perez & Perez, 2011.
- Spaceport America, in Truth or Consequences, New Mexico, designed by Foster & Partners, 2011.
- National September 11 Memorial & Museum, in New York City, designed by Snøhetta, 2011.
- Liverpool Interlomas, in Mexico City, designed by Rojkind Arquitectos, 2011.
- McCoy Federal Building, in Jackson, Mississippi, designed by Schwartz and Silver, 2012.
- Sidra Medical Center, in Doha, Qatar, designed by Pelli Clarke Pelli, 2012.
- MOCA Cleveland, Ohio, designed by FMA, 2012.
- Broad Art Museum, in East Lansing, Michigan, designed by Zaha Hadid, 2012.
- Basra Sports City, in Basra, Iraq, designed by 360 Architects, 2013.
- Cornell NYC Tech, on Roosevelt Island, NYC, designed by Morphosis, 2013.
- Emerson College, in Los Angeles, California, designed by Morphosis, 2014.
- Armenian American Museum, in Glendale, California, designed by Alajajian Marcoosi Architects, 2027

== Notable art and design projects ==
- Sky Stations, by R. M. Fisher; owned by the City of Kansas City, Missouri; 1993.
- 1 3 5 7 9 11, by Sol LeWitt; owned by the Nelson-Atkins Museum in Kansas City, Missouri; 1995.
- 'Issey Miyake,' by Gordon Kipping & Frank Gehry, in Tribeca, New York City, 2001.
- One Sun, 34 Moons, by Walter de Maria; owned by the Nelson-Atkins Museum in Kansas City, Missouri; 2002.
- Glass Ceiling, by Dale Chihuly; owned by the Museum of Glass, Tacoma, Washington; 2002.
- National Museum of the American Indian, interior artwork designed by Ramona Sakiestewa, Washington, D.C., 2004.
- "Oculus", by Reilly Hoffman; Permanent Collection of Topper Johns, 2006.
- Microcosm, by Leo Villareal; Permanent Collection of the Nerman Museum of Contemporary Art in Overland Park, Kansas; 2007.
- Winds of Aphrodite, by Suikang Zhao; owned by the City of Kansas City, Missouri; 2008.
- LAPD Memorial to Fallen Officers, by Gensler; owned by the Los Angeles Police Foundation, California; 2009.
- Art Wall at Doha, by Jan Hendrix; and the architects at Legorreta & Legorreta, Doha, Qatar; 2010.
