= Koszyki Hall =

Hala Koszyki
- Koszyki Hall
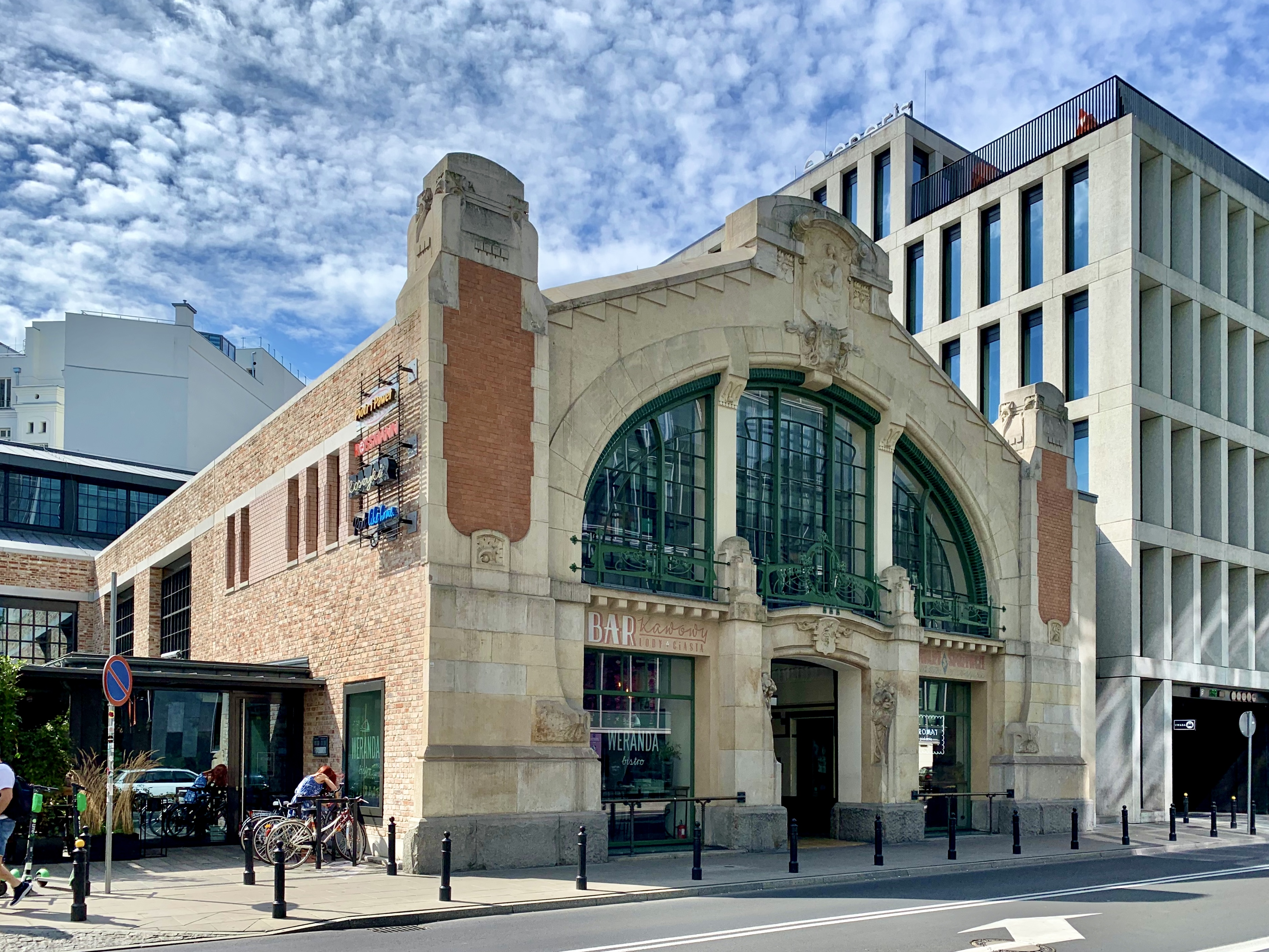
- One of the two side wings
- Location: Warsaw, Poland
- Coordinates: 52°13′20″N 21°00′39″E
- Address: Koszykowa Street 61/63, Warsaw
- Opened: 2 March 1909
- Architect: Juliusz Dzierżanowski, Zygmunt Otto
- Floor area: 21,000 m^{2} (230,000 sq ft) in total area including office space
- Parking: 200
- Public transit: 159
- Website: https://www.koszyki.com/

Hala Koszyki (pronounced Ko-shi-kee), also known as Koszyki Hall in English, is a historic market and food hall located on 63 Koszykowa Street in south-central Warsaw, Poland. Initially opened in 1909, it has been since redeveloped into a mixed-use retail and commercial facility with offices, bookstores, elegant bars and gourmet restaurants. The heritage shopping arcade was designed in an Art Nouveau style.

== History ==
By the end of the 19th century Warsaw's continuous expansion and rising population necessitated a large enclosed market hall, which would provide better sanitary conditions. Trade and commercial activity was then usually undertaken outdoors rather than indoors, for example in the streets or, most commonly, on public squares. A circular market pavilion with separated booths for each tradesperson was already in existence since 1841 on the Iron-Gate Square. The opening of Hale Mirowskie (Mirów Market Halls) in 1902 saw the inauguration of Warsaw's first and largest enclosed shopping complex. Both of these were situated in the northern part of old Warsaw, however, its rapidly-growing southern part lacked such facility.

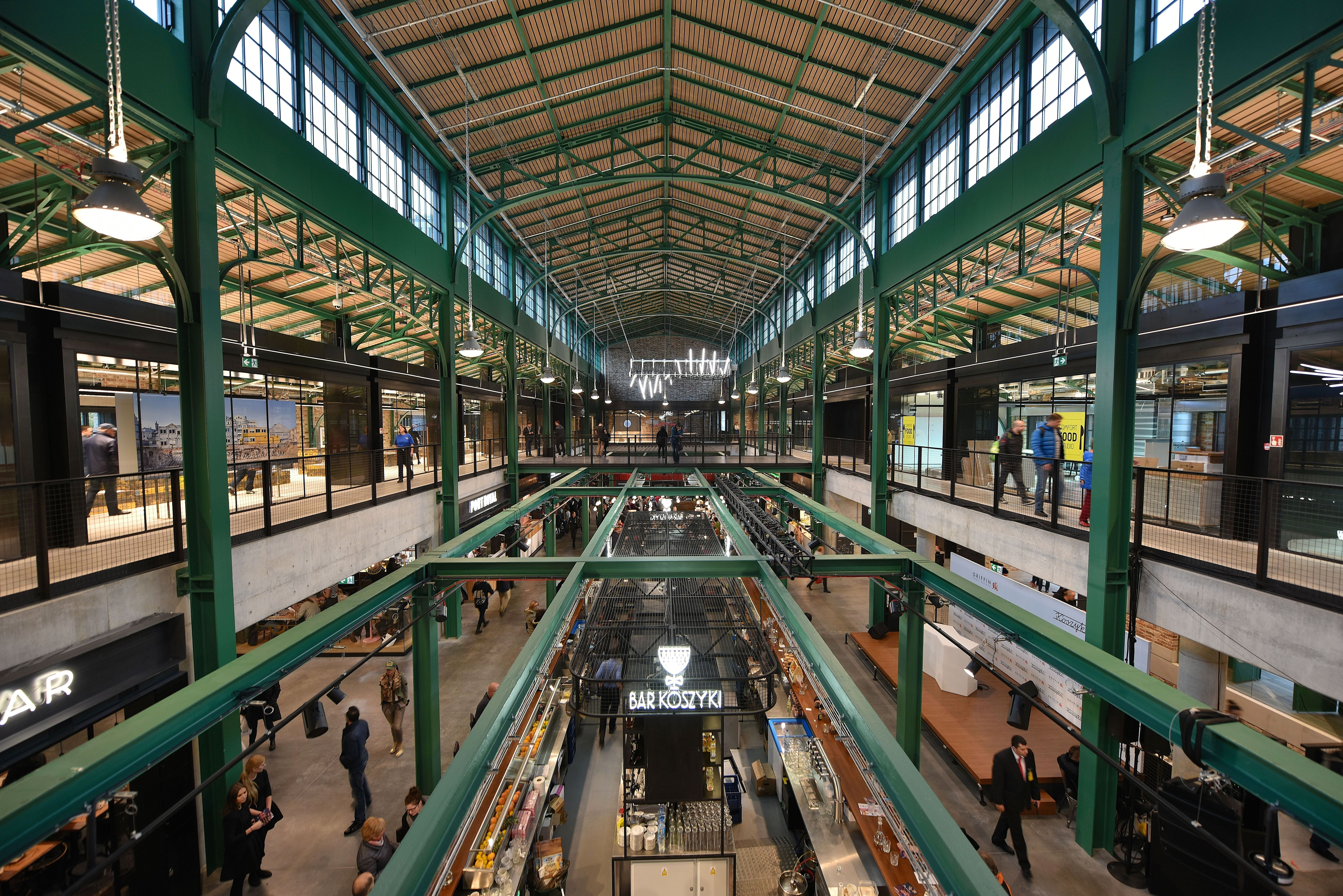
The steel frame arcade

The construction of Hala Koszyki spanned over two years, from 1906 to 1908, and was finalized in March 1909. The name of both the street and the new market can be translated as "shopping baskets", but its name is in fact derived from a wicker (woven materials for basketmaking) used to strengthen the Lubomirski Ramparts, a series of protective earthworks erected between 1770 and 1771 which once ran along modern-day Koszykowa Street. Ironically, the name of the street became official in the 1880s, long before any marketplace was established.

The exterior was decorated with sculptures and carved cartouches featuring the mermaid, a symbol of Warsaw, and animal or food-related themes. The main central hall was 77 meters in length by 27 meters in width at the time of its completion. The two entrance wings were 15 meters by 15 meters each. The building was considered extremely modern for its time and possessed all the necessary conveniences; the steel-framed arcade had booths and cubicles specifically designed for each individual trade – butchers were provided with marble tabletops for cutting meat, fishmongers with pools and grocers were equipped with cold rooms and coolers. Despite this, little space was designated in the 'cour d'honneur' for horse carts and wagons which transported the stock food to the Hall. A considerable problem was also the size of Koszykowa Street, which was narrow and soon became overcrowded, thus limiting access to the market.

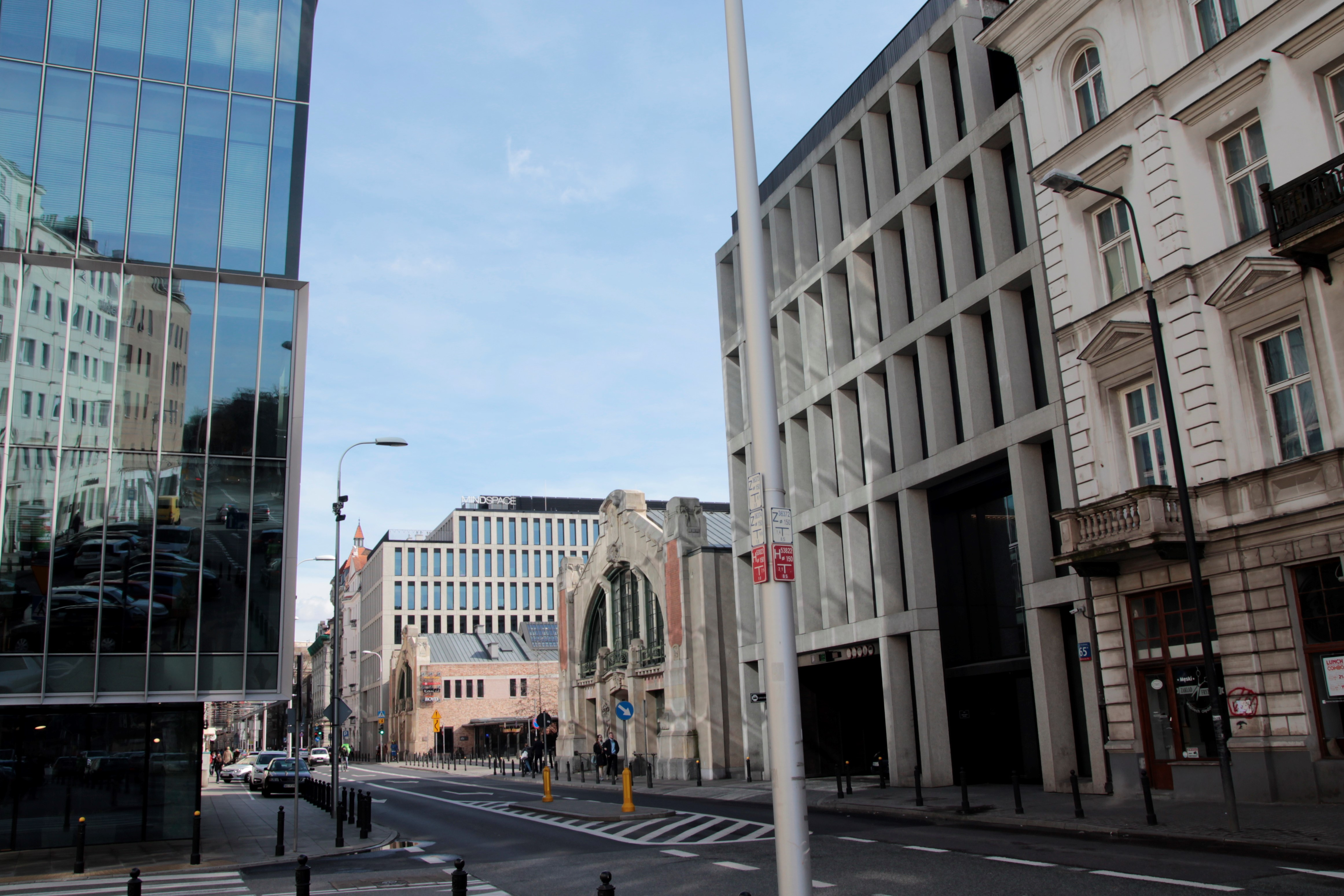
View from Koszykowa Street

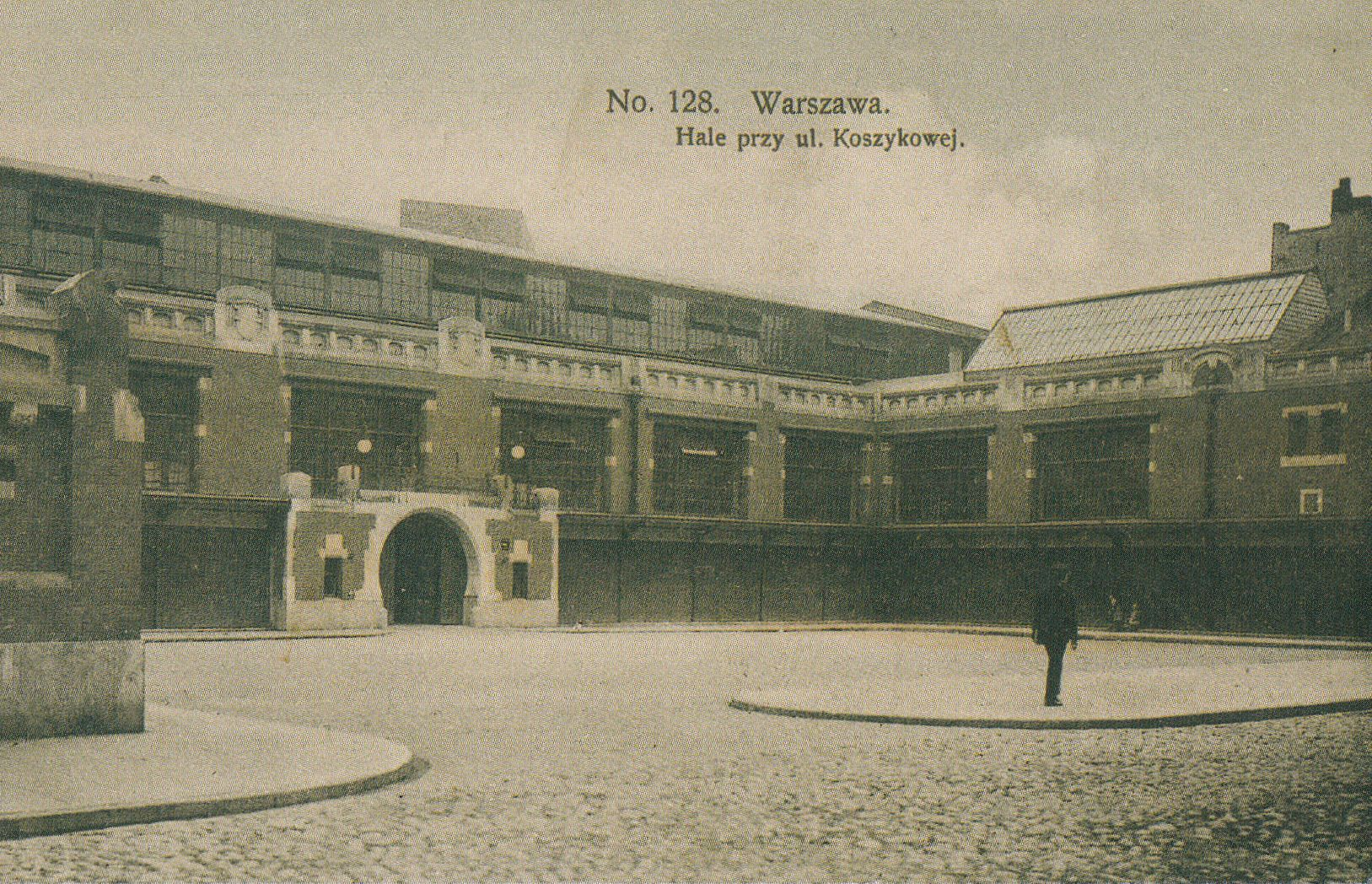
Hala Koszyki on a postcard from 1908

Prior to the First World War (1914–1918) only a handful of stalls and booths were rented; most became occupied after the war. During the interwar period (1918-1939), the market was known to be visited by more wealthier of Warsaw's society due to higher prices. The building was damaged and burnt in the Second World War, particularly during the Warsaw Uprising, but its steel frame prevented the entire structure from collapsing. The side wings with its decorative architectural elements on the exterior were entirely preserved. The complex was restored to its original appearance in 1949. In 1965 the building was enlisted into the Registry of Objects of Cultural Heritage.

=== Redevelopment ===
Hala Koszyki was purchased in 2009 by Avestus Real Estate which hoped to revitalize the object. It was subsequently demolished, with the exception of the two side wings and the northern wall of the arcade facing Koszykowa Street. Its complete redevelopment and reconstruction began after Griffin Group purchased the site in 2012. The market hall was redesigned by JEMS Architekci and reopened in October 2016. All of the original structural elements were reincorporated into the new mixed-use building.

The venue inside offers restaurants specializing in haute cuisine, bars, pubs, cafeterias, bookstores and designer shops.

== See also ==
- Arcade (architecture)
- Architecture of Poland
- History of Warsaw
