= L. William Zahner =

American chief executive

L. William Zahner III
- Born: June 30, 1955 (age 71); Kansas City, Missouri, United States
- Education: University of Kansas, Bachelor of Science in Civil Engineering
- Occupations: CEO & President, of Zahner
- Term: 1989-Present
- Predecessor: L. William Zahner II
- Board member of: Kansas City Art Institute Board of Trustees, Nerman Art Museum Advisory Board, School of Engineering at the University of Kansas.
- Website: azahner.com

Leo William Zahner III (born June 30, 1955, in Kansas City, Missouri) is the president and CEO of Zahner, an architectural metal company in Kansas City, Missouri. His company is responsible for the production of high-profile buildings by architects such as Frank Gehry, Morphosis, and Herzog & de Meuron. In 1989, he became company president, and is credited with transforming the company from a regional sheet-metal contractor into a national architectural metals and facades producer. He also guided the company towards producing works by artists as well as architects. Zahner has authored two books on architectural metals, titled Architectural Metal Surfaces and Architectural Metals: A Guide to Selection, Specification, and Performance.

In 2013, Zahner was appointed by the U.S. Secretary of Commerce to the Manufacturing Council, where he represents Missouri's Fifth District. Zahner was inducted as an honorary AIA member in 2007. Zahner holds five patents which pertain to the Architectural Metals industry, he serves as the Industry Liaison for the National Architectural Committee of SMACNA, and in 2006, was awarded the Copper Medal, Associazone Italiana di Metallurgia (AIM).
