= Tru by Hilton =

Modern midscale hotel chain run by Hilton Worldwide

- Type: Subsidiary
- Industry: Hospitality
- Founded: January 2016; 10 years ago
- Founder: Hilton Worldwide
- Headquarters: McLean, Virginia, United States
- Number of locations: 347 (2026)
- Area served: United States, Canada, Mexico, Brazil, Colombia, Honduras, Vietnam
- Parent: Hilton Worldwide
- Website: www.trubyhilton.com

Tru by Hilton is a brand of American chain of hotels owned by Hilton Worldwide with hotels operated by franchisees.

A Tru by Hilton in Concord, North Carolina

== History ==
The hotel brand was announced in January 2016 at the Americas Lodging Investment Summit in Los Angeles. It was designed to compete against Comfort Inn and La Quinta, and the first Tru by Hilton hotels were expected to open late in the same year. The goal was to create rooms of 228 square feet (21.2 m^{2}) with "clever" bathrooms. The brand uses platform beds instead of box springs and uses a landing zone where guests can place their luggage and hang their clothes rather than a dresser. Hilton realized that they could shrink the width of the room from the typical 12 to 10 feet (3.66 to 3.05 m) because typically the TV cabinet would take up 2 feet (0.61 m), but with flat screen televisions the space could be spared. The desk that was decided to be used is a portable chair attached to a table, allowing the guest to use the chair wherever they want in the room. As of April 2026, it has 347 properties with 33,840 rooms, of which 333 properties and 32,275 rooms are franchised.

== Operations ==
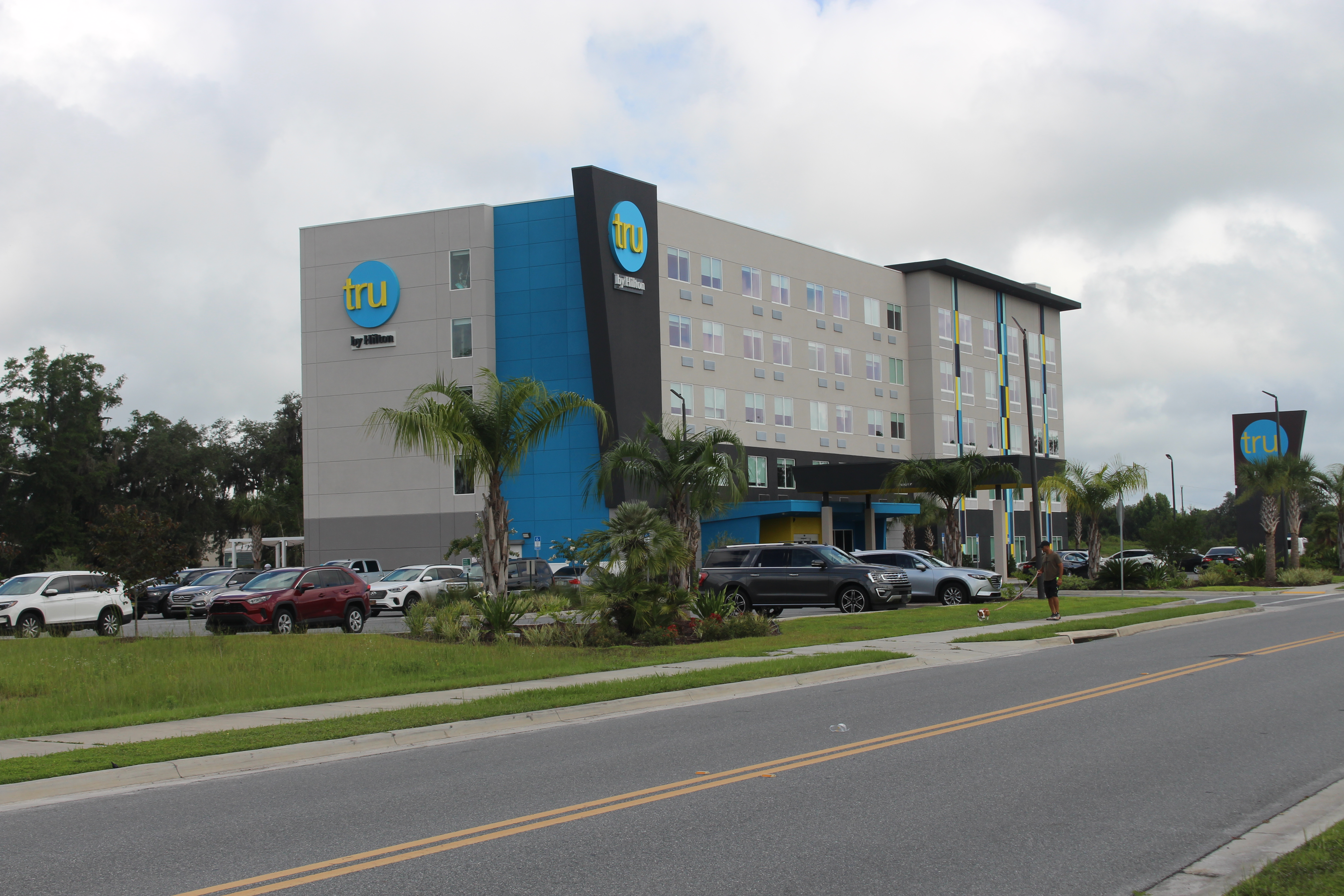
Tru by Hilton in Lake City, Florida

Tru by Hilton operates as a franchise under Hilton Worldwide. When the launch of the new brand was announced, Tru by Hilton had already signed over 100 franchise agreements. The brand will occupy the mid-scale hotel market. Tru by Hilton was designed to be scalable so that properties could vary in size and still fit in urban, suburban, airport or highway adjacent settings. The brand's initial locations were in the Atlanta, Cheyenne, WY, Dallas, Houston, Chicago, St. Louis: St. Charles, Missouri, Denver, Portland, Boise, ID, Oklahoma City and Nashville markets.

The hotels offer limited food and beverage options and feature a social area characterized by a large central lobby, referred to as The Hive, that is divided into sections for eating, working, playing and lounging. The front desk, called the Command Center, also features a social media wall to engage guests.
