= Paseo Interlomas =

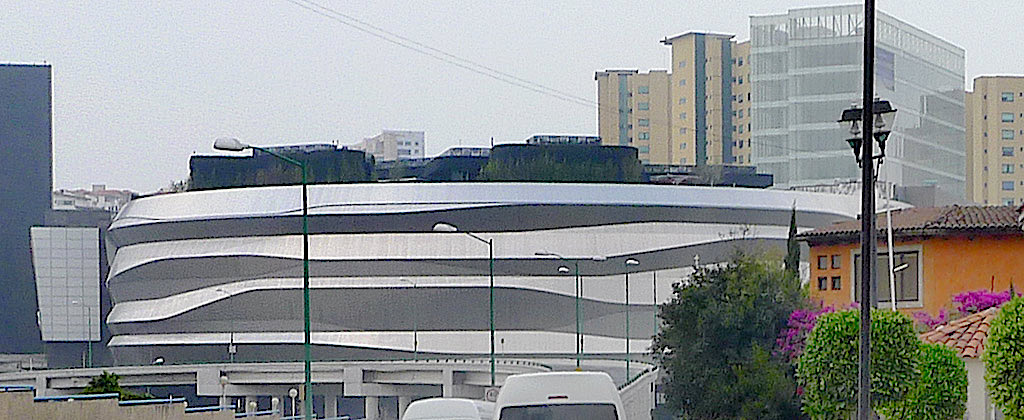
- The Liverpool Interlomas building at Paseo Interlomas
- Location: Interlomas edge city, Huixquilucan, State of Mexico, (Greater Mexico City)
- Coordinates: 19.396561°N 99.281563°W
- Address: Vialidad de la Barranca 6, colonia Ex-Hacienda Jesús del Monte
- Opened: 2011
- Num. of stores: 200
- Num. of anchor tenants: 3
- Floor area: 73,965 square metres (796,150 sq ft)
- Website: www.paseointerlomas.com.mx

Paseo Interlomas is a 73,965-square-metre (796,150 sq ft) shopping mall in the Interlomas edge city in Huixquilucan, Greater Mexico City. Three department stores anchor the mall: Liverpool, El Palacio de Hierro and Sears. The landmark Liverpool Interlomas building also houses a 16-screen Cinepolis cinema, an ice rink, 12 restaurants and a food court with 180 vendors.
