= Food hall =

Food and drinks retail area

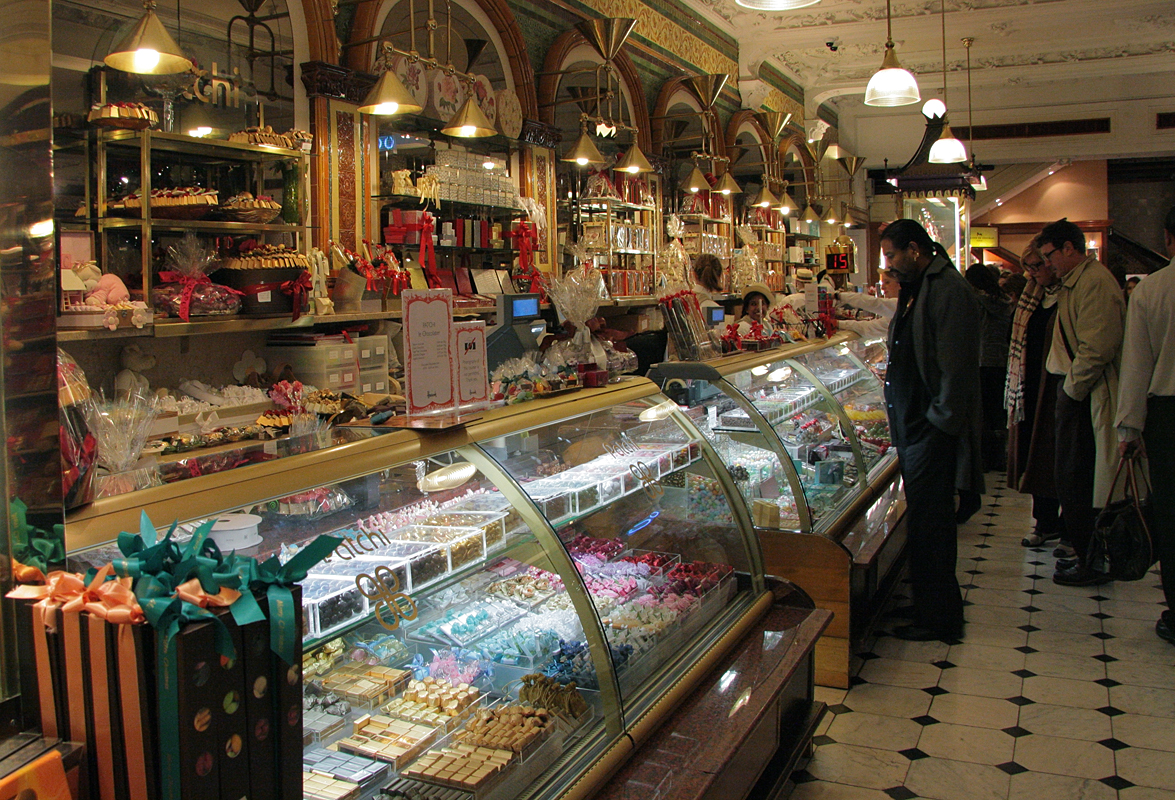
Confectionery counter, Harrods Food Hall, London

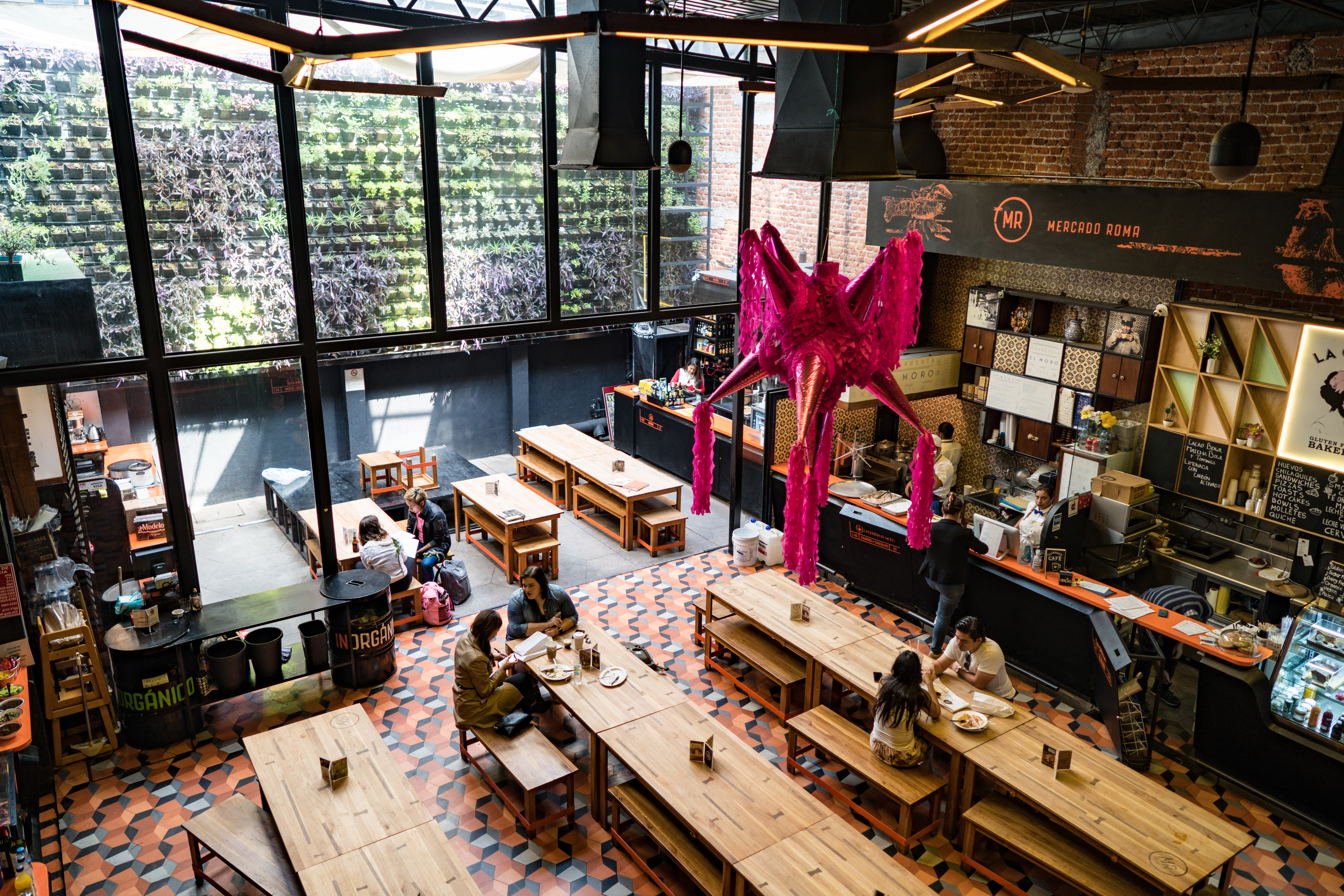
Mercado Roma in Mexico City

A food hall is a large standalone location or department store section where food and drinks are sold.

== Overview ==
Unlike food courts made up of fast food chains, food halls typically mix local artisan restaurants, butcher shops and other food-oriented boutiques under one roof. Food halls can also be unconnected to department stores and operate independently, often in a separate building, or repurposing a building formerly used for something else.

The number of food halls in the United States grew by 37% in 2016 and has spread across the country. Advocates state that it provides a third place for gathering, can function as a business incubator, and is part of a trend towards more experiential retail experiences tailored to a given community, in contrast to traditional food courts with national chains which are deemed inauthentic.

The term "food hall" in the British sense is increasingly used in the United States. In some Asia-Pacific countries, "food hall" is equivalent to a North American "food court", or the terms are used interchangeably.

A gourmet food hall may also exist in the form of what is nominally a public market or a modern market hall, for example in Stockholm's Östermalm Saluhall, Mexico City's Mercado Roma and Warsaw's Koszyki Hall.

== See also ==
- Food truck
- Hawker centre
