= Michel Rojkind =

Mexican architect

Rojkind, Michel
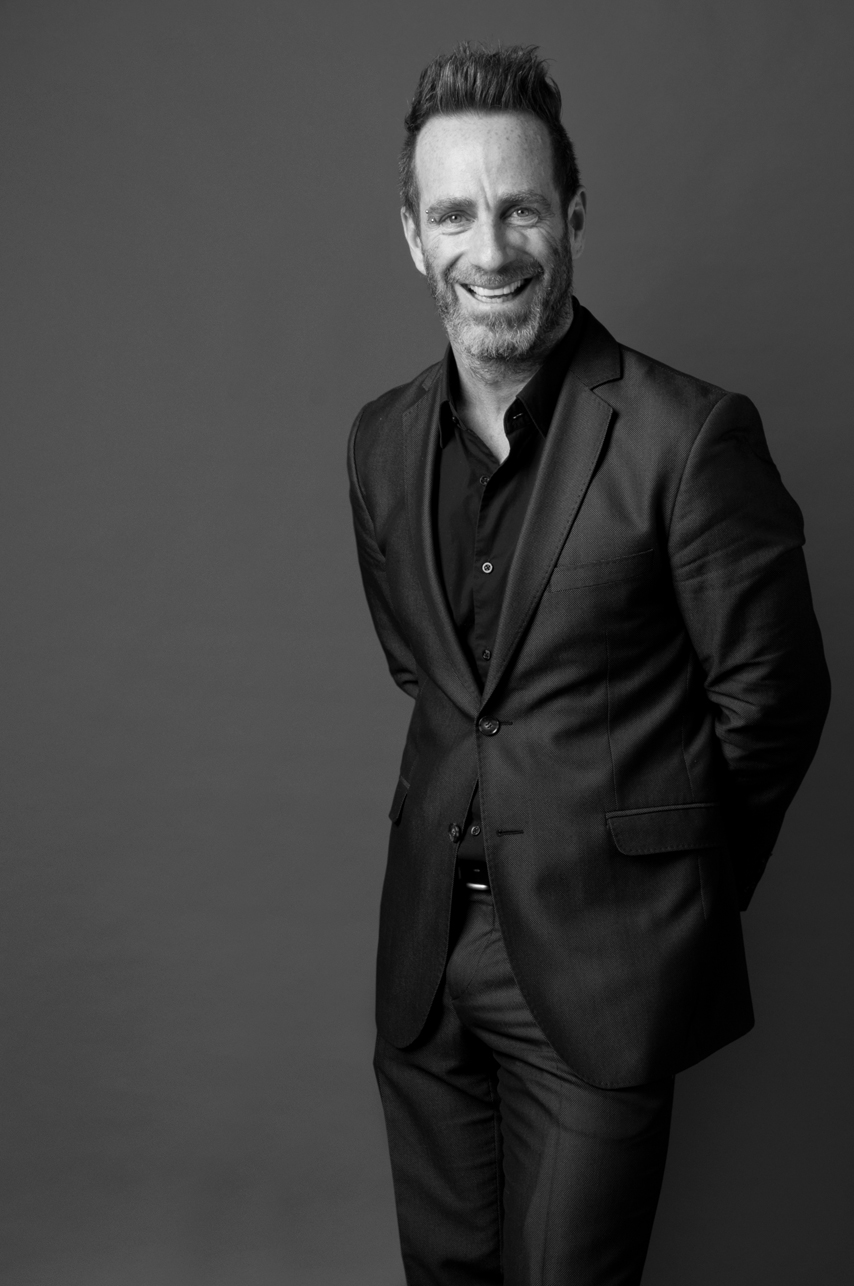
- Rojkind, Michel
- Born: December 18, 1969; Mexico City
- Occupation: Architect
- Practice: http://www.rojkindarquitectos.com/
- Buildings: Casa F2, in Atizapan (2000)

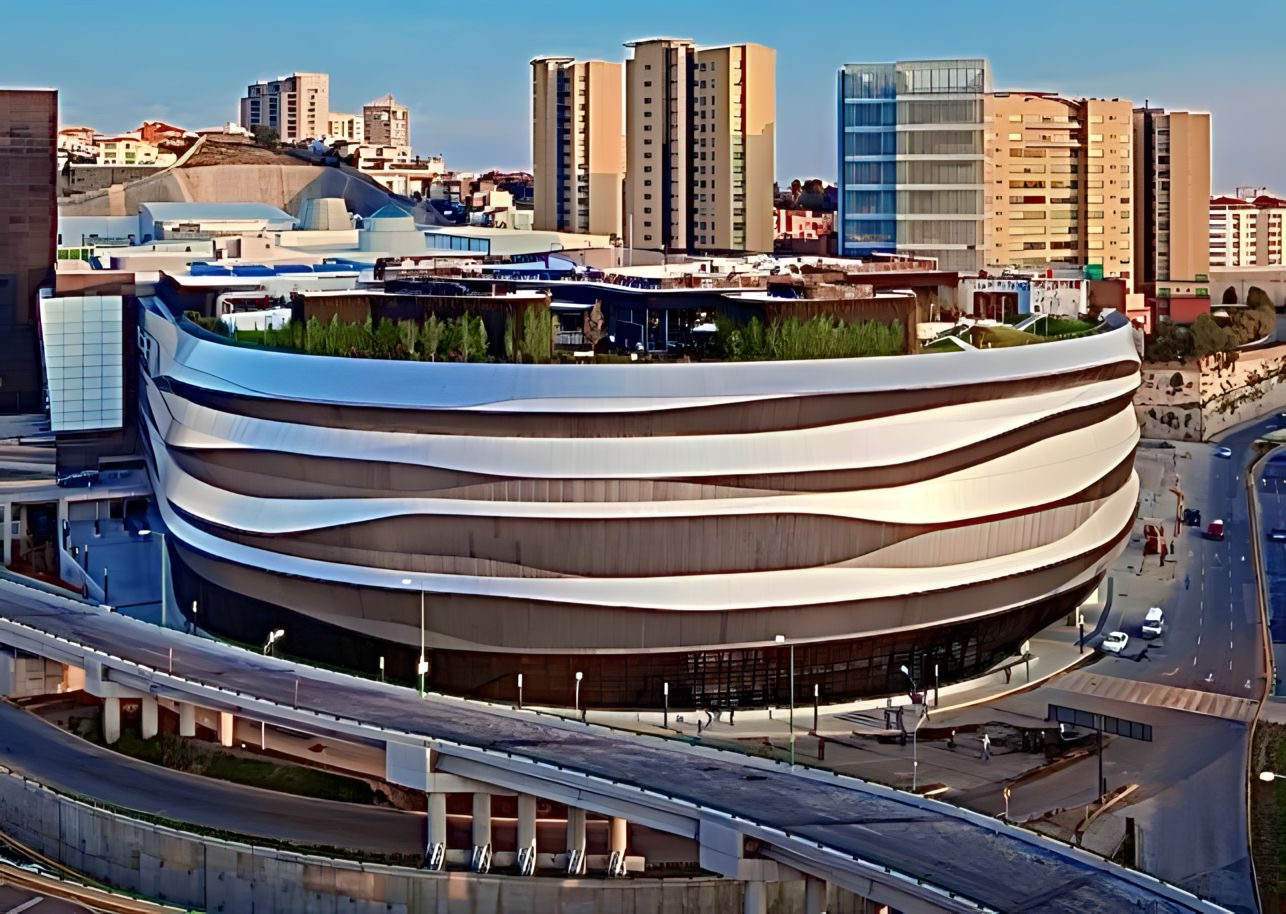
Liverpool department store, Interlomas, Greater Mexico City. Stainless steel façade by Rojkind.

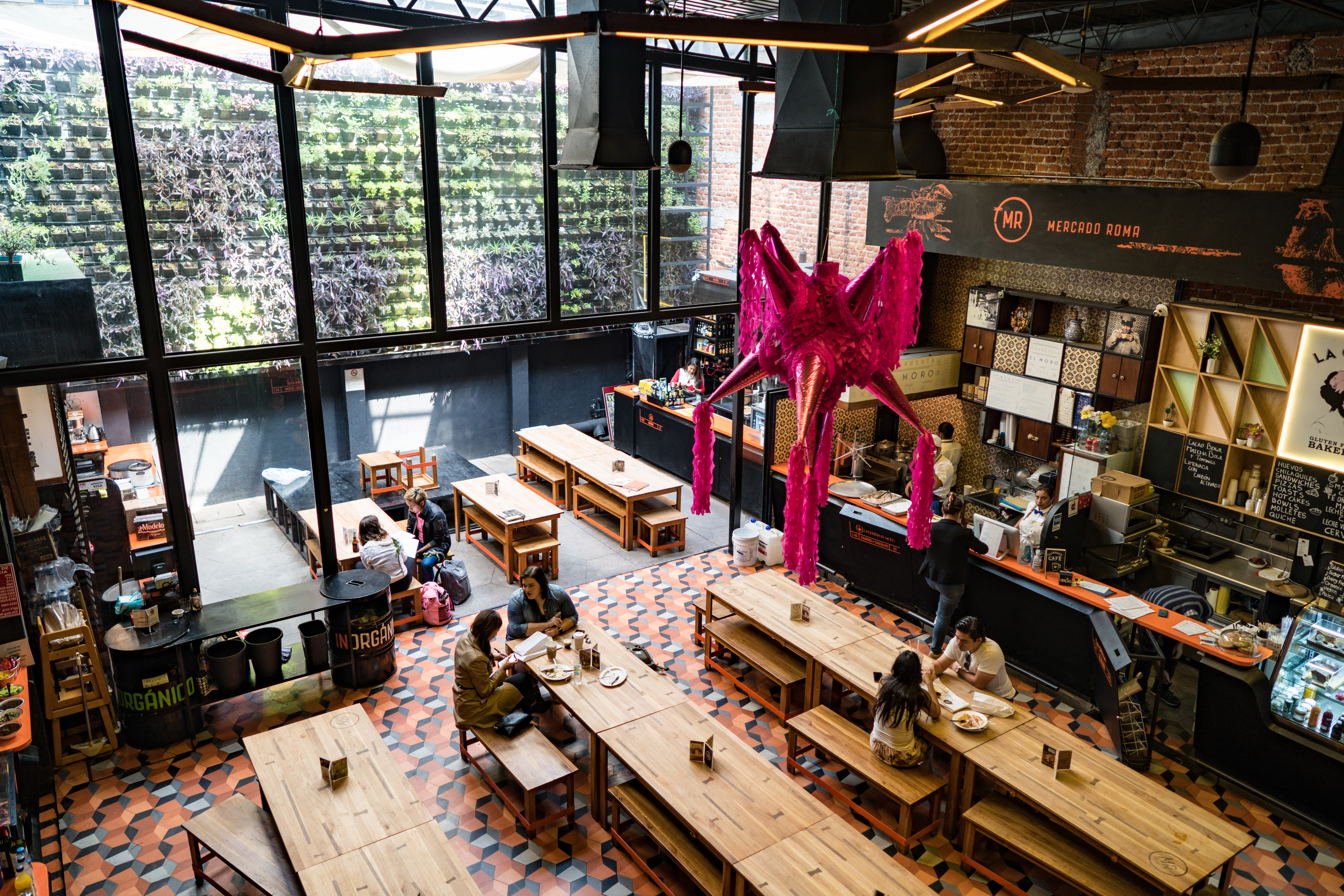
Interior, Mercado Roma

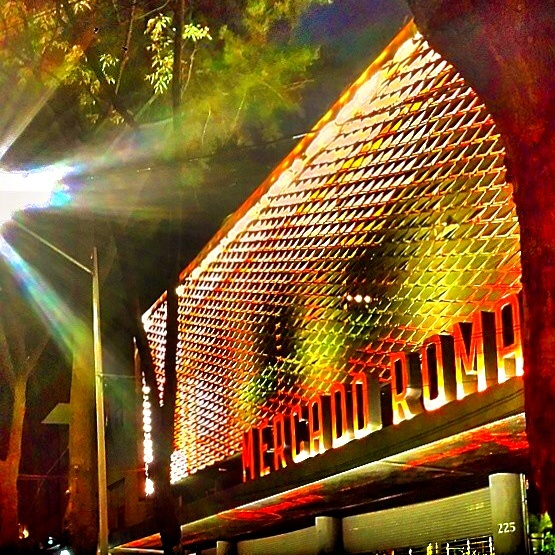
Mercado Roma at night

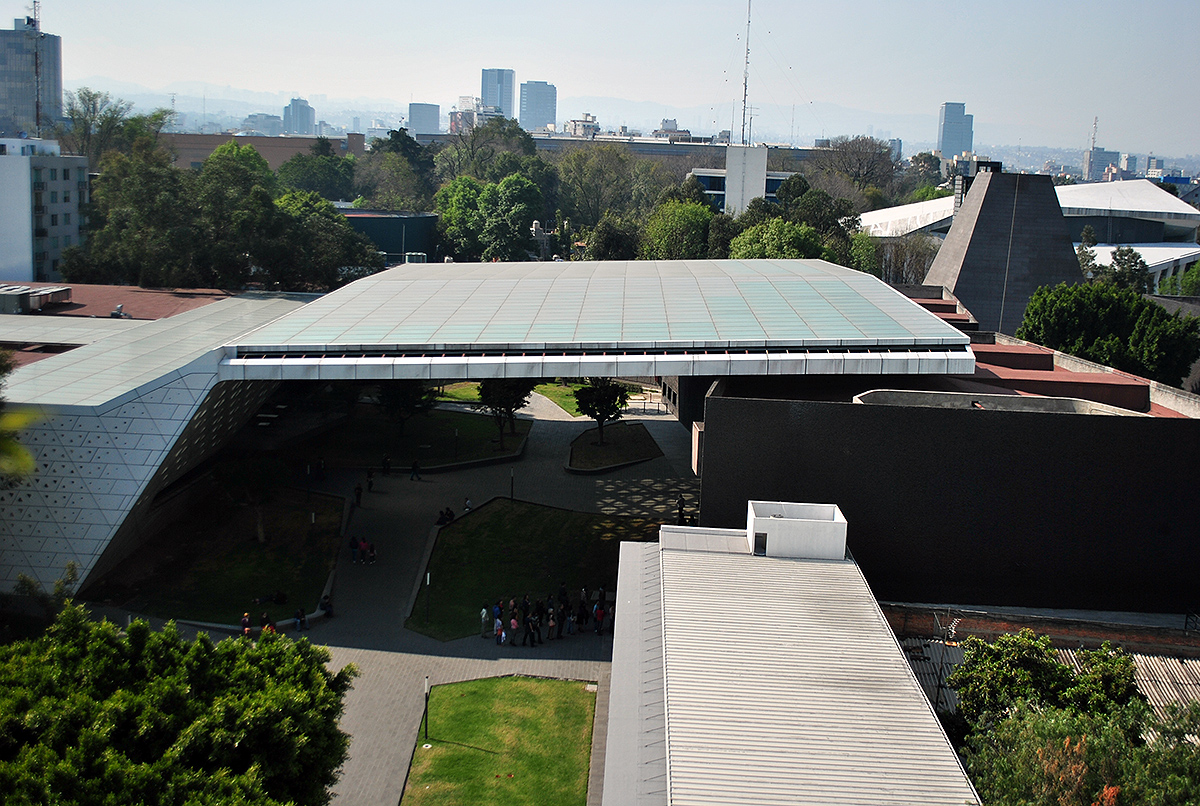
Cineteca Nacional del Siglo XXI^{[es]} in Mexico City

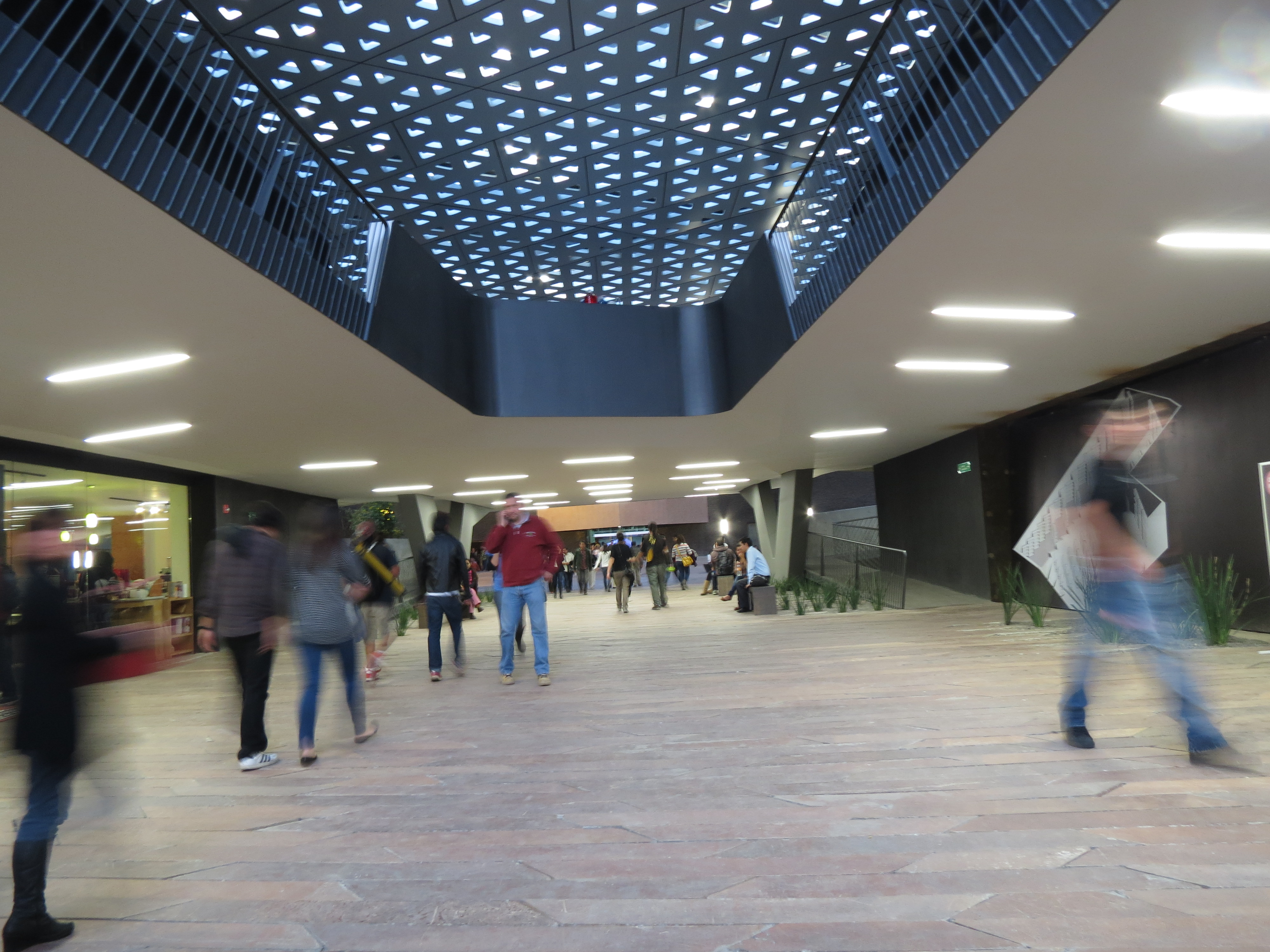
Cineteca Nacional del Siglo XXI, Mexico City

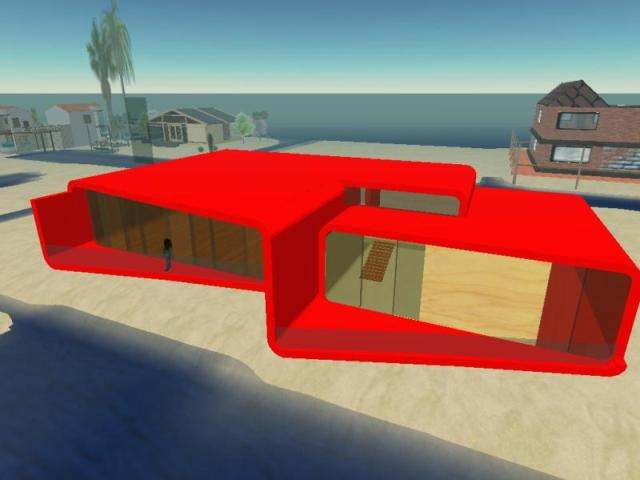
Model of the PR34 house

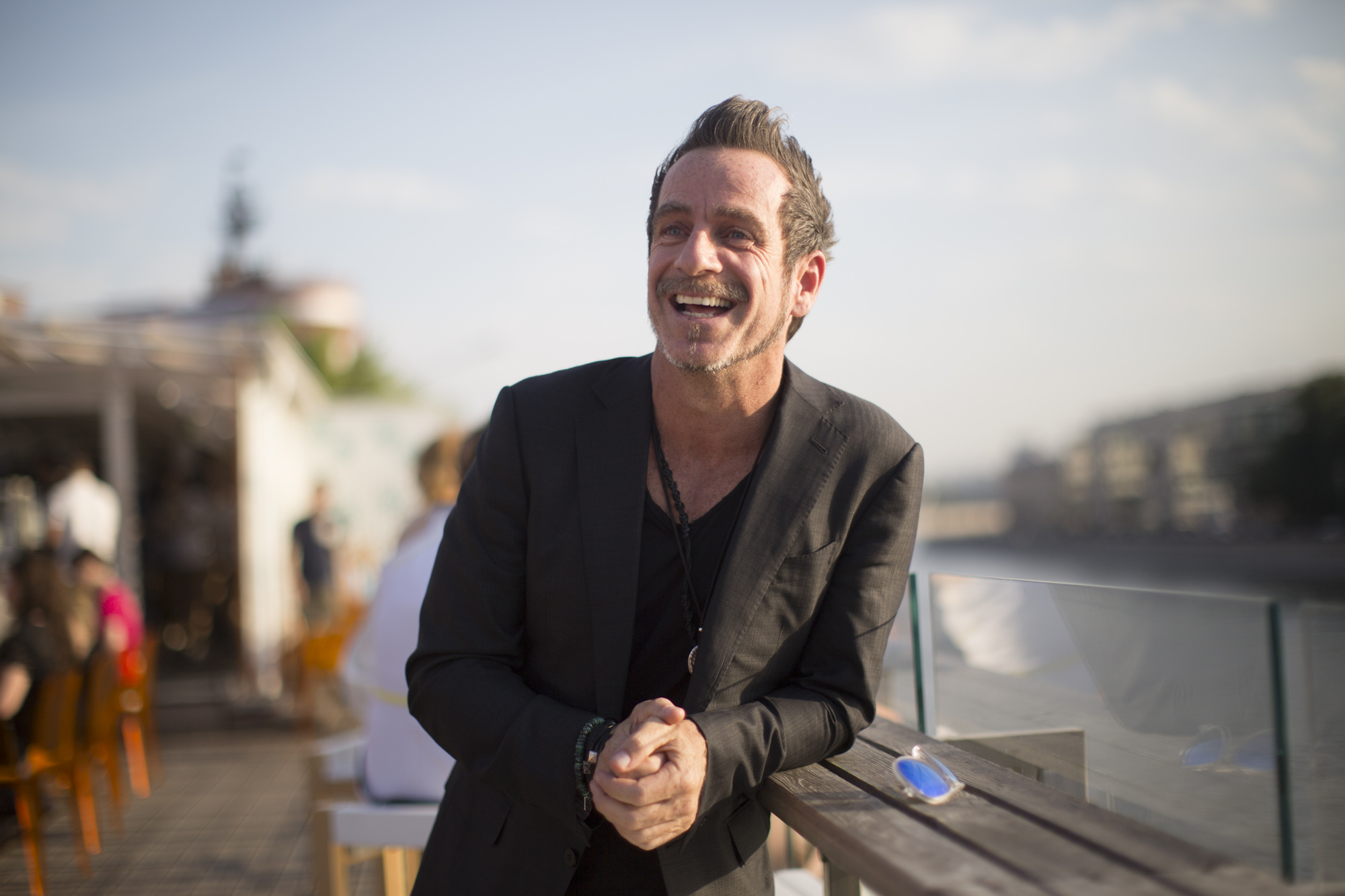
Michel Rojkind

Michel Rojkind (born December 18, 1969, in Mexico City) is the founding partner of Rojkind Arquitectos and according to Forbes Life a representative of a Mexican generation of architects transforming the country. His office was recognized by Architectural Record in 2005 as one of the best ten Design Vanguard firms.

== Early life ==
Rojkind has two sisters and a brother. His father, Marcos Rojkind Matlyuk, was a professor, doctor and an expert on hepatic fibrosis and winner of the National Prize for Arts and Sciences (Mexico). While his father taught at the Albert Einstein College of Medicine, the family lived in The Bronx and Scarsdale, New York, for three years.

== Trajectory ==
Michel Rojkind was born in Mexico City, where he took courses in Architecture and Urban Planning at the Universidad Iberoamericana (1989-1994). In 1981 he joined singer Alek Syntek as a drummer. In 2002 he founded Rojkind Arquitectos; since then, the firm has been on a strong path and exploration of architectural programs and building techniques, successfully translating the complex forms of these new ideas into realities that can be built with local manufacturing skills.

He has been short-listed to participate in several large-scale international projects, in Mexico, Canada, Kuwait, China, Dubai, Singapore and Spain.

He has been a visiting professor at the Southern California Institute of Architecture (SCI-Arc) in L.A. and at the Institute for Advanced Architecture of Catalonia (IACC) in Barcelona. Rojkind has participated as juror for several international awards and competitions and has lectured in many different countries.

“We generate strategies that enhance the designs final result, nowadays a design proposal needs to find its full potential, it needs to have an added value, give something back to society...” Michel Rojkind

Rojkind has gained international acclaim by being featured in numerous well-known architectural publications. In 2011, he was named by Wallpaper* magazine as one of the “150 Movers, Shakers and Makers That Have Rocked the World in the Last 15 Years.” The Los Angeles Times named Michel Rojkind among the “Faces to Watch in 2010". Also in 2010, Rojkind was selected by the Architectural League of New York as “Emerging Voices".

His recent lectures at international conferences have also brought the firm notoriety: Architectural Record magazine’s “Innovation”, 2011; TEDx, 2010; and 3rd Holcim Forum for Sustainable Construction in 2010, World Architecture Festival (WAF) in 2013 and Design Indaba during 2014. Perhaps two of the most meaningful commendations Rojkind has received are from his native country. In 2010, Rojkind was named as one of the “Country’s Treasured Architects” by the Mexican Civil Registry, he was featured by ProMexico Magazine as one of the “50 Mexican Names in the Global Creative Scene” and “..one of the most influential architects of contemporary Mexican scene” in 2013 by Forbes magazine.

== Awards and nominations ==
Michel Rojkind’s design for the Nestlé Chocolate Museum, Toluca, Mexico was awarded the International Architecture Award (2008) as one of the best realized designs around the world in 2007, and was nominated for the British Museum Award (2008) for the ten best buildings of 2007. He has contributed to Contemporary Corporate Architecture (2009), Phaidon Atlas of 21st Century Architecture (2009) and Open House: Architecture and Technology for Intelligent Living (2006).

== Works ==
Some of Rojkind's projects include:

- Casa F2, in Atizapan de Zaragoza, Greater Mexico City (2000)
- Casa pR34, in Tecamachalco, Greater Mexico City (2003)
- Falcón I Headquarters (2006)
- Nestlé Chocolate Museum near Toluca (2007)
- Nestlé Application Group in Querétaro (2009)
- Extension to the Rufino Tamayo Museum, in collaboration with BIG (design phase)
- Portal of Awareness, Nescafe (2011)
- Tori Tori restaurant in Polanco, Mexico City (2011)
- Reforma 232 apartment building, Mexico City
- Falcón II Headquarters
- Cineteca Nacional del Siglo XXI, Mexico City
- Chedraui hypermarket, Santa Fe, Mexico City (188,196 sq ft (17,484.0 m^{2}))
- Liverpool (department store) façade, Avenida de los Insurgentes, Colonia del Valle, Mexico City, 2010
- Liverpool department store Paseo Interlomas, Huixquilucan, Greater Mexico City
- Mercado Roma, Colonia Roma, Mexico City, 2013

== Other Activities ==
With Arturo Ortiz Struck, Derek Dellekamp and Tatiana Bilbao, Michel Rojkind established MXDF Urban Research Center (2004). The aim of the non-profit organization is to intervene in specific areas of the urban development, modifying the production of urban space in Mexico through the systematic study of social, political, environmental, global and cultural conditions. He has been a jury member at World Architecture News (WAN), World Architecture Festival (WAF), and the Institute for Advanced Architecture of Catalonia (IAAC) “Self Sufficient City” competition. He also presented a keynote address at the 3rd International Holcim Forum 2010 in Mexico City.
