= Charles Wilson Killam =

American architect and engineer (1871–1961)

Charles Wilson Killam FAIA, ASCE
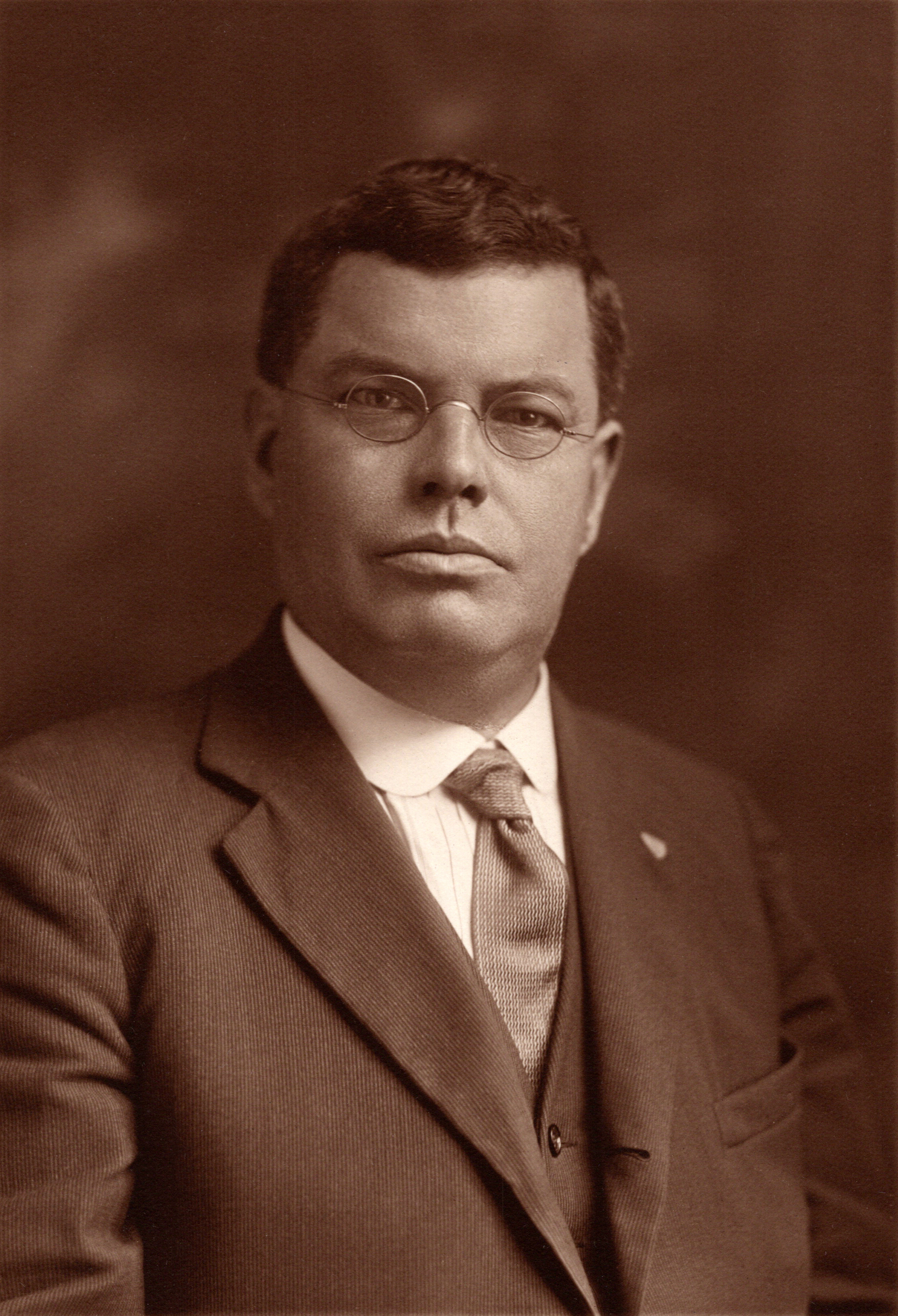
- Born: July 20, 1871; Charlestown, Massachusetts, US
- Died: May 12, 1961 (aged 89); Providence, Rhode Island, US
- Burial place: Shawsheen Cemetery
- Notable work: Restoration of Mount Vernon; Consulting architect for Baker Library and Harvard Business School expansion
- Spouse: Amy Edna Whittemore (m. 1894; died 1942)

Academic work
- Discipline: Architectural construction and engineering
- Institutions: Harvard University (1908–1937); Cambridge School of Architecture and Landscape Architecture (1916–1924, 1937–1942)

Acting Dean of the Harvard University School of Architecture
- In office June 1917 – September 1922
- Preceded by: Herbert Langford Warren
- Succeeded by: George Harold Edgell

Charles Wilson Killam FAIA, ASCE (July 20, 1871 – May 12, 1961) was an American architect, engineer, and professor at Harvard University. He was widely recognized for his technical knowledge, architectural theory, educational views, and publications. He was also known for his consulting work for the Harvard Business School and Baker Library as well as his extensive restoration work at Mount Vernon. He was a key contributor to the development of Harvard's School of Architecture and to collegiate architectural education throughout the United States. Killam also took an active role in the planning and development of Cambridge, Massachusetts and served on numerous boards and committees. Additionally, he was an advocate for low-cost and public housing as well as an early advocate for architectural education for women.

== Early life and education ==
Charles Wilson Killam was born in Charlestown, Massachusetts, on July 20, 1871, and grew up in the Hyde Park neighborhood of Boston. He was the son of Horace Wilson Killam from Wilton, New Hampshire, and Georgianna Gage from Watertown, Massachusetts. Killam had three sisters and two brothers. Killam attended Hyde Park Grammar Schools at the Henry Grew School, where he completed the school's course of study and graduated in 1885. After graduating from the Grew School, he attended Hyde Park High School. In 1887, during his second year at the high school and at the age of 16, he dropped out to work.

Killam's interest in architecture began at an early age and he pursued his studies at home and while traveling extensively through Europe. His father was a practical draftsman during this period and taught evening classes in elementary, mechanical, and architectural drawing at Hyde Park High School. After leaving high school, Killam furthered his architectural education by taking evening classes, but never graduated from high school.

== Peabody and Stearns ==
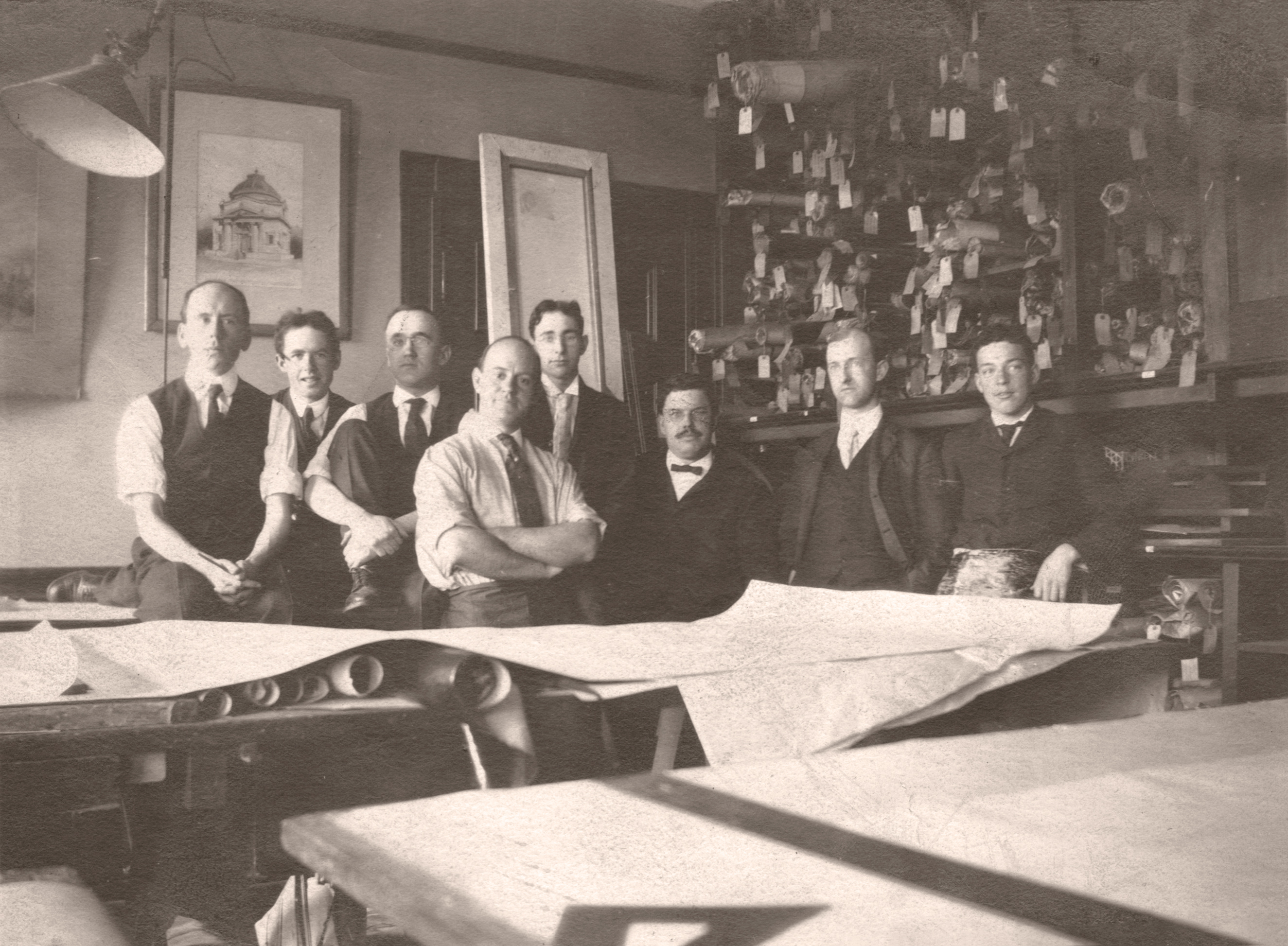
Peabody & Stearns Boston office (c. 1905). Killam center in bow tie.

After leaving high school in 1887, Killam went to work at the architectural firm of Peabody & Stearns in Boston where he became a draftsman. Robert Swain Peabody, the co-founder of the firm, was an encouraging mentor to Killam and his architectural career. During his 21 years with Peabody & Stearns, Killam advanced his architectural knowledge and furthered his technical expertise in the field. He eventually became the Chief Architectural Engineer for the firm.

To further develop his skills, Killam noted how he visited numerous job sites because that was then "the only way to find out, for instance, how to support a terracotta cornice or how to do flashing." Since he was not on the payroll of these jobs, he was able to spend as much or as little time on various aspects of the construction as he wanted. He valued this experience and spent countless hours examining plans in architectural and engineering offices, copying details and specification provisions. Killam stated that his interest covered the whole field of architecture:

From the cheapest to the most expensive buildings, from wooden houses in Alabama, Minnesota, and the Gaspé Peninsula, from the bottom of deep foundations in Detroit and New York, and to the top of the Cathedral of St. John the Divine and the Empire State Building.

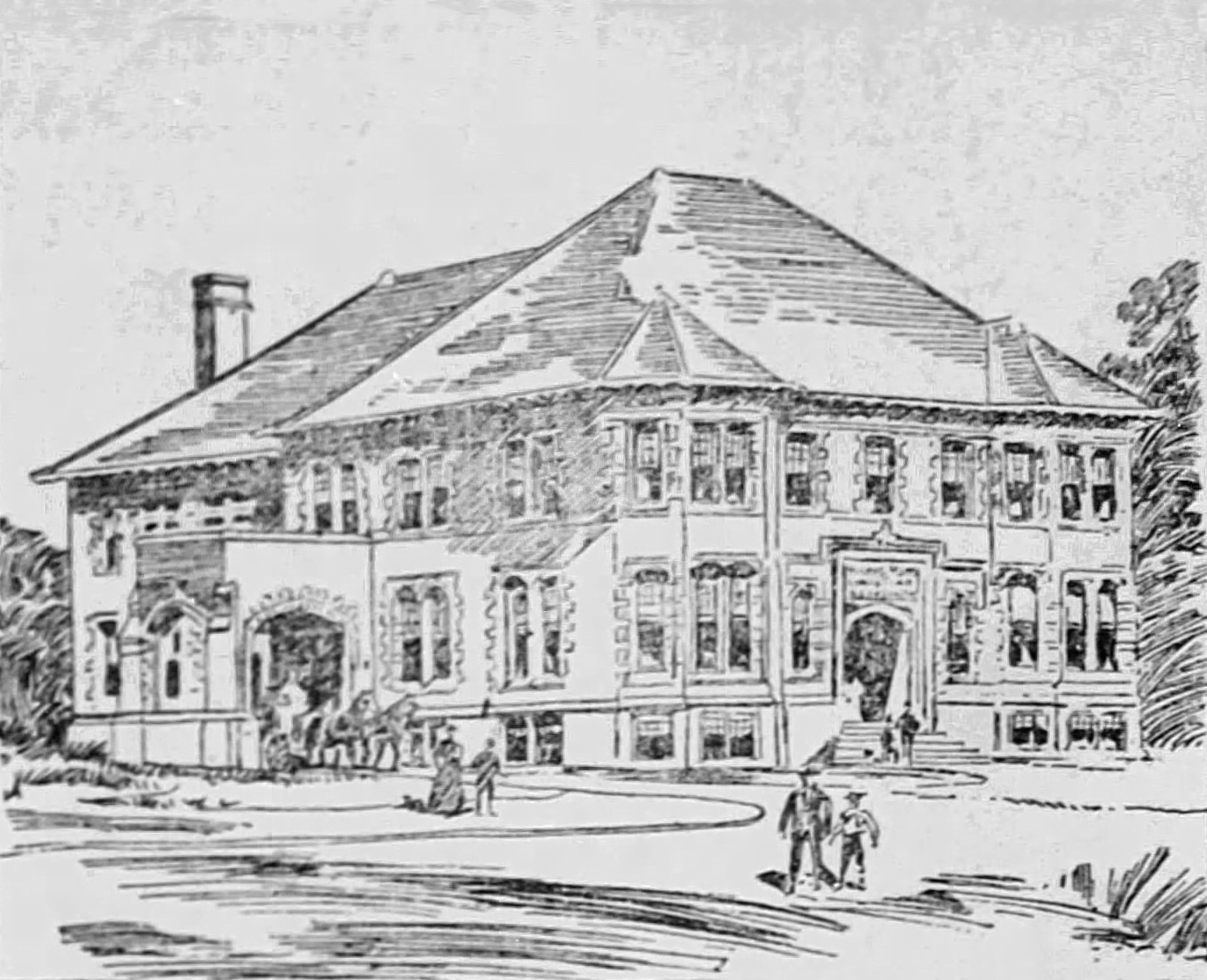
Killam's design for the Hyde Park YMCA building (1900).

In 1900, Killam was awarded second prize in the Boston Society of Architects Rotch Travelling Scholarship, and traveled throughout Europe studying architecture. While at the firm, Killam also entered various design competitions such as for the new Young Men's Christian Association (YMCA) building in Hyde Park.

== Harvard University ==
In 1908, Killam left Peabody & Stearns to begin his academic career as an instructor in architectural construction and engineering at Harvard University. He was appointed to strengthen a recognized weakness in architectural engineering at Harvard and first taught a course in the resistance of materials and elementary structural design to address this weakness. Within a year, Killam was appointed assistant professor of architectural construction and taught at Harvard's new School of Architecture when it was founded by Herbert Langford Warren in 1912. Killam became associate professor in 1915, associate professor of architecture in 1921, and professor in 1924.

Killam taught his students the adaptation of modern construction techniques to the older styles of design. He was critical of designers of the time who misrepresented the structure of their buildings and gave too much power to engineers. He recognized the importance of integrating the teaching of design and construction and was one of the first to advocate for closer collaboration between the two fields. Killam continuously improved Harvard's department of architecture until it became one of the strongest in the United States. His well-known courses in fundamentals of engineering and construction were extremely thorough, complete, and well arranged to meet the needs of architecture students.

In 1917, following the death of Warren, Killam was appointed Acting Dean of the School of Architecture. Despite the challenges of the ongoing war and dwindling enrollment, Killam sought to carry forward Warren's principles while placing greater emphasis on construction. Although the curricula in architecture and landscape architecture remained largely unchanged with Killam as Acting Dean, there was a significant shift where landscape architecture students no longer studied the rudiments of architectural design in the same studios with architecture students. Killam held this position until 1922 when George Harold Edgell was appointed as new Dean of the school.

One of Killam's students, Edward Durell Stone, had failed Killam's "Theory of Building Construction" (Note: The full name of this course was Theory of Building Construction—Statics, Resistance of Materials, and Elementary Structural Design. This course's description can be found in the Harvard University 1915–16 School of Architecture register at the HathiTrust Digital Library, p. 25) course as a freshman at Harvard. Stone's classmate Walter Harrington Kilham Jr. (Note: Kilham's most notable work was the Princeton University Library in 1948. He was the son of Walter Harrington Kilham Sr., an instructor at MIT and co-founder of Kilham & Hopkins. No direct relationship to Killam.) recalled that Stone "couldn't take it any longer and had decided to quit the school and go over to the rival MIT." Stone had asked Dean Edgell to be exempt from retaking Killam's course but was denied, and, in response, Stone transferred to MIT. John McAndrew, (Note: McAndrew went on to teach architectural history at Vassar College and founded Save Venice Inc. He was also curator of architecture and industrial art at the Museum of Modern Art and director of the art museum at Wellesley College.) another classmate of Stone, commented that Killam's course was "a very 'tough and rough' course, the only one in which anyone learned anything at all."

Killam in 1912

At the time of Killam's retirement from Harvard, Dean Joseph Hudnut stated that "Professor Killam has conducted the work in his field with great distinction. He has greatly augmented the efficiency of the instruction in architecture and his methods have been widely copied in other American schools of architecture."

=== Educational views ===
Killam held views on education and the field of architecture that were pioneering for the time. He "welcomed the new styles especially where unusual construction called for applying basic principles of engineering." He also strongly believed that modern materials and methods of construction should be integrated into styles from the past, particularly the classic and Renaissance forms. While serving as Acting Dean, Killam described Harvard's position on the necessity of courses in history and the fine arts, that the architects of the country should have a broad cultural training before they begin their technical studies.

Killam had a curiosity for learning which sustained throughout his life. Whenever there was a new and interesting building or design, he made sure to visit it in person. In the early days of commercial flight, he flew to distant locations to examine various structures. He instilled this curiosity in his teaching by actively encouraged his students to explore their architectural interests and he supported these interests with his own research and materials from outside the classroom:

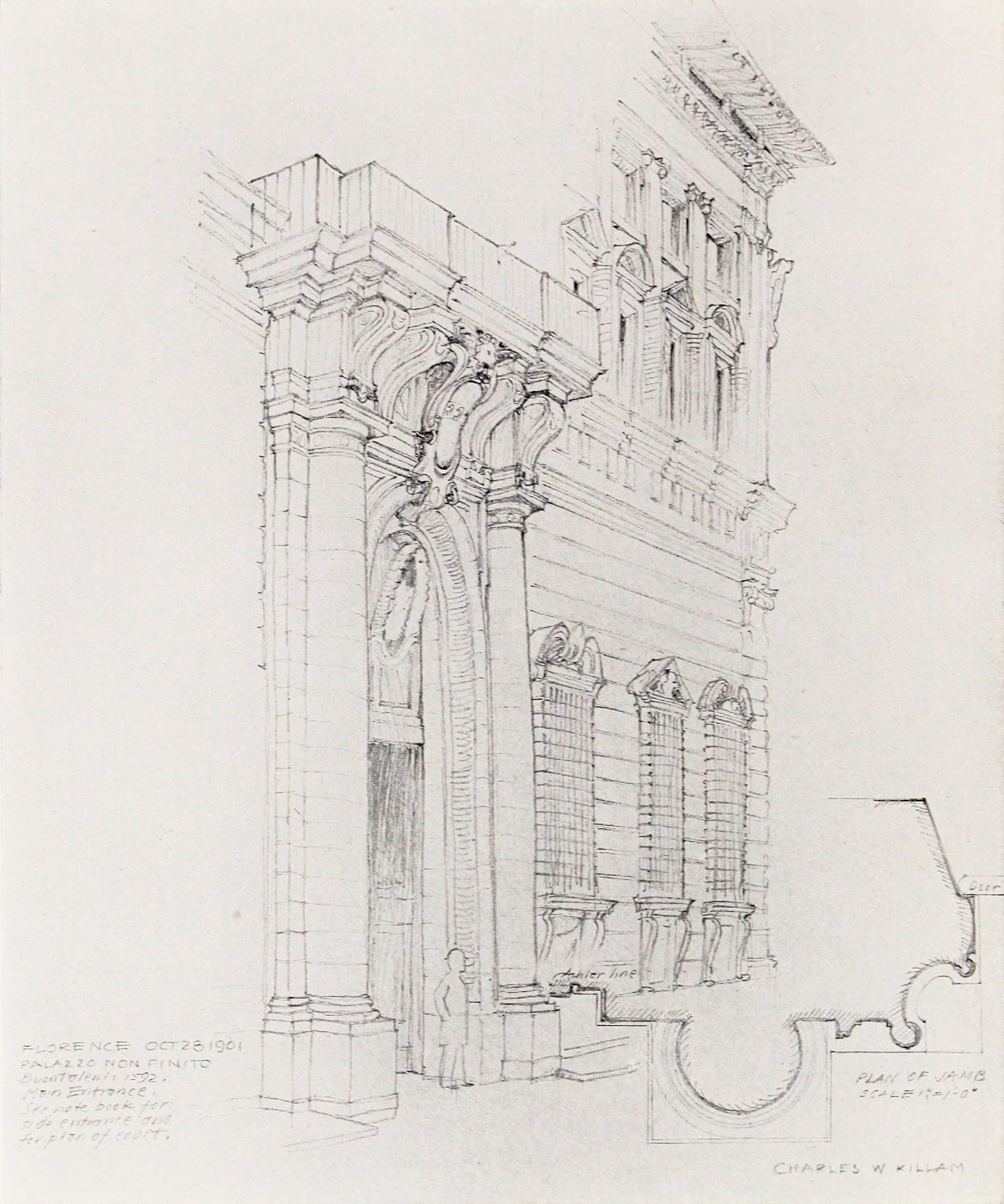
Killam's sketch of Palazzo Nonfinito (1901).

Should a student speak of the innovation in design in a recent building in a Dutch city, Mr. Killam would know of it and describe its structure. Should a student expose on his desk some token of interest in the then shaping fields of housing or planning, he could be sure that Professor Killam would bring to the next class session carefully noted magazines or other publications with articles related to the interest of the student.

He demanded the same thoroughness of his students that he gave himself and never returned a student's unfinished problem "without his professional correction to the last detail, sharply noted in red ink and colored pencil so that the solution would be clear and direct." He defined the principal function of the architect of the time as "to plan and direct the execution of building projects so as to produce convenient, safe, economical and durable enclosures for our manifold activities." Killam was determined that each student be thoroughly grounded in all methods of building construction, both old and new. In his "Resistance of Materials and Elementary Structural Design" course, Killam demanded that his students gain a sound knowledge of construction by learning how to derive formulae from theory and how to create their own tables and handbooks. His architectural experience convinced him that "a student should not run errands, keep time, or check materials, and that a student does not have any possible time to waste in actual manual labor at the innumerable trades dealing with innumerable materials."

Killam in his office (1934).

Charles Killam led his students to understand the responsibilities and challenges in the architectural profession, and to grasp the realities of building in terms of structural design and the techniques of building. By not permitting demands for outside consultation or practice to absorb him, he found time to be a complete teacher—to discuss with each student the relationships between the theory of the lectures and the pragmatic practices of the studios. Such devotion to the School of Architecture contributed much to its reputation.

Killam was also an advocate and supporter for women's education, particularly in the field of architecture and construction. As early as 1916, Killam lectured at the Cambridge School of Architectural and Landscape Design for Women, which his colleagues Henry Atherton Frost and Bremer Whidden Pond had founded less than a year earlier. He lectured in architectural construction, landscape construction, and criticized graduate theses at the school from 1916 through the 1924 academic year.

Killam was dedicated to achieving honest and effective methods of building in architecture. His work helped to combine construction techniques with the art of design in architectural education. Although Killam retired from Harvard before modern architecture was introduced, his goals were eventually recognized within this new approach to teaching architecture. Even after his death, Killam's courses at Harvard were continued to be taught without alteration. His methods were fundamental in the work of the school and was considered one of the most persistent and valuable factors in Harvard's educational system.

=== Retirement from Harvard ===
Killam in commencement gown (1937).

In 1936, Harvard President James B. Conant was in search of a new chairman for the new Graduate School of Design and to lead the school into the era of modernism. Among the candidates, German architect and Bauhaus founder Walter Gropius was the most favored by Conant for the position. Conant sought the opinions of the school's faculty about the possible appointment of Gropius and received overwhelming approval and support. Killam, however, cast the lone outright objection to Gropius's appointment. The engineering aesthetic of the new and modern style of architecture represented by Gropius did not appeal to him. At an address to the Association of Collegiate Schools of Architecture, Killam made his objection clear stating that the school's primary function was to train architects, not painters, sculptors, or commercial designers for machine-made products. He challenged the economic viability of teaching modern design and firmly rejected the expanded role of the architect that Gropius promoted.

With the overwhelming approval of Gropius from the school's faculty, and despite Killam's objections, Conant proceeded to offer Gropius the position in December 1936 and he was commenced the following spring. Killam remained adamantly opposed to the appointment of Gropius as the school's new chairman and professor of design and disliked the prospect of Gropius bringing a new Bauhaus to Harvard. In protest to this new assignment, Killam decided to resign his professorship at Harvard University. In January 1937, after 29 years as Harvard faculty, Killam retired and became professor emeritus.

Being too active to accept full time retirement, Killam continued to serve the School of Design as an advisor while actively participating in the faculty councils. After his resignation in 1937, Killam returned to lecture at the Cambridge School of Architecture and Landscape Architecture, which had formed a partnership with Smith College during his absence. He held this position until the school closed in 1942 and was absorbed by Harvard's Graduate School of Design, at which point he retired for a second time. Throughout his tenure as professor emeritus, Killam continued to work as consultant on architecture and played a key role in the drafting of building and zoning codes. His span as professor of architecture emeritus from 1937 to 1961 was, at the time, the longest in the history of Harvard's School of Architecture and Graduate School of Design.

== Cambridge planning and development ==
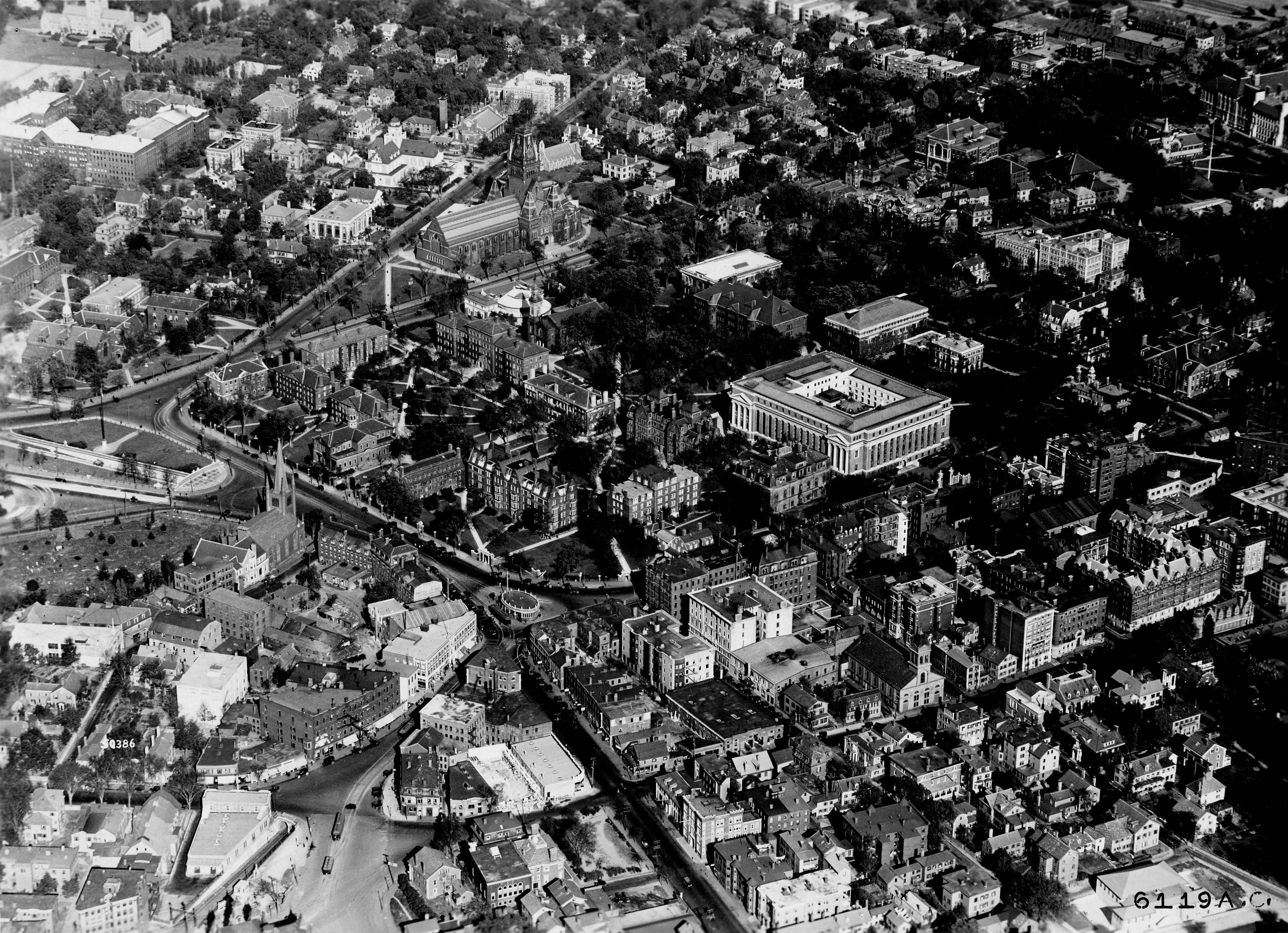
Harvard Square aerial 1921.

In addition to his academic career, Killam was an active member of his community, taking on numerous responsibilities and roles within the city of Cambridge, Massachusetts. He was a resident of Cambridge for nearly 50 years having moved there at the beginning of his academic career at Harvard. He resided at 20 Walker Street in Cambridge before settling at 51 Avon Hill Street in Cambridge where he lived for over 40 years. Killam was actively involved in matters of building and zoning codes, tenement-house legislation, city planning, unemployment relief, and low-cost housing. He was also a significant figure in bringing the Plan E Charter to Cambridge, which provided for a city council-manager form of government.

Killam held various leadership positions in the Cambridge community. He served on the first board of directors for the Cambridge Housing Association when it was formed in 1911. He was elected as the director of the Cambridge Chamber of commerce and served as the chairman of the Cambridge Housing authority. Additionally, he served as a member, secretary, president, and chairman of the Cambridge Planning Board, where he contributed to the development of the city and played a crucial role in shaping its growth. His leadership roles in these positions demonstrated his commitment to civic engagement and to the betterment of the city of Cambridge.

=== Cambridge planning board ===
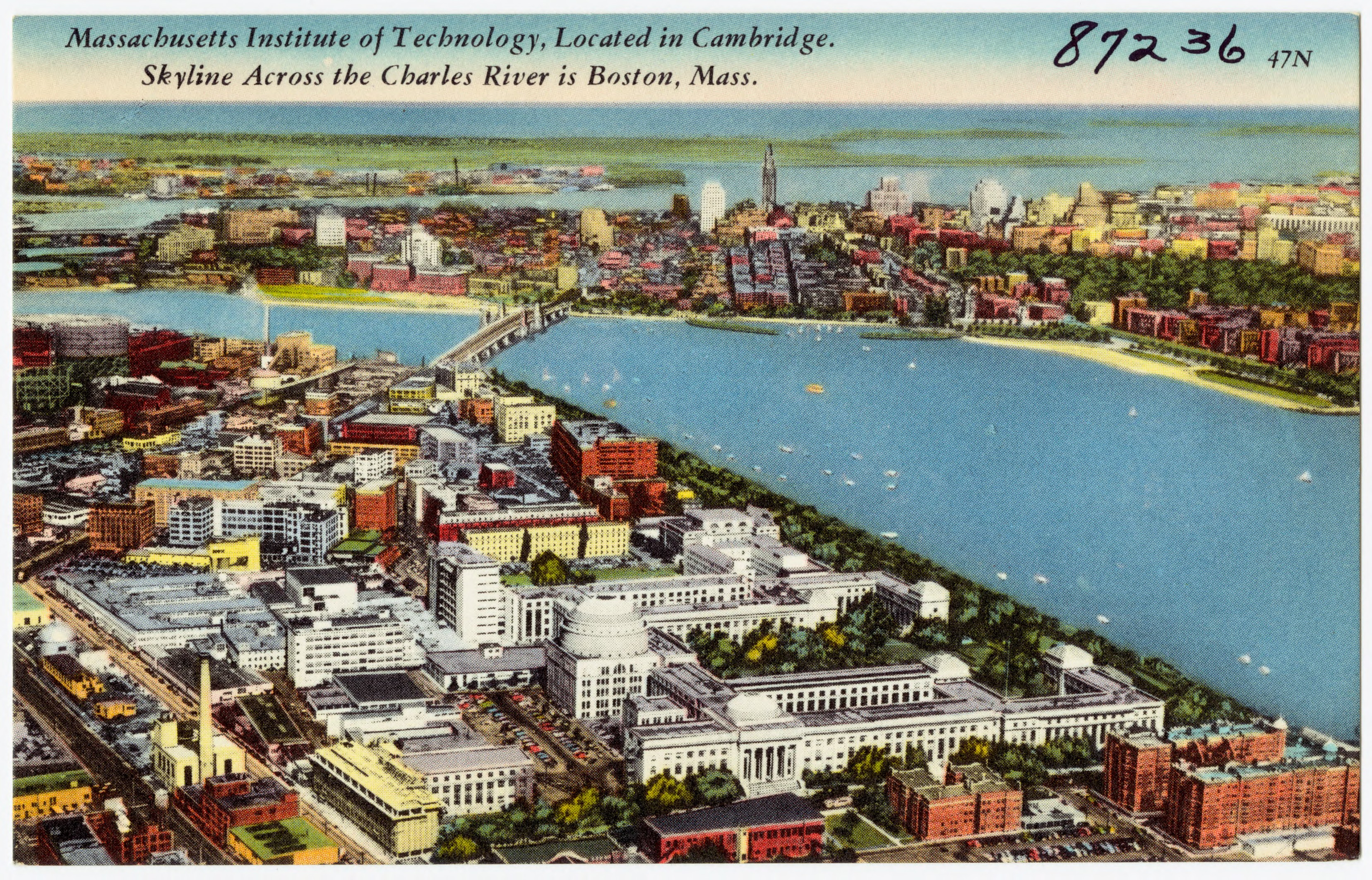
View of Cambridge and the Charles River.

In 1924, Killam was appointed to the Cambridge Planning Board by Mayor Edward W. Quinn and served as president and chairman of the board. The board, while headed by Killam, was responsible for work including widening of streets to improve traffic and assisting with the Charles River betterment project to improve the Charles River Basin. Killam "[knew] more about Cambridge streets and how to improve traffic conditions than any salaried official in the city." He also took an active part in drafting the city's new zoning ordinance and was adamantly opposed to the construction of a bridge at Dartmouth street crossing over the Charles River. In 1929, despite being "one of the city's most efficient commissions," the board resigned as a body. The primary reason being that the board was often ignored on important city planning issues, their recommendations were given little consideration, and they received minimal cooperation and support from city officials.

A year later in 1930, Richard M. Russell was elected mayor of Cambridge and Killam was appointed to Russel's new Planning Board. This board was responsible for work including improving traffic and parking conditions in the city as well as city planning and economic development. Mayor Russell also appointed Killam as first chairman of the newly formed Cambridge Housing Authority in 1935. However, Killam resigned from the Housing Authority in 1936 because of a difference of opinion with other members of the authority regarding plans for the local slum clearance project and that too much money was spent on land rather than economic development.

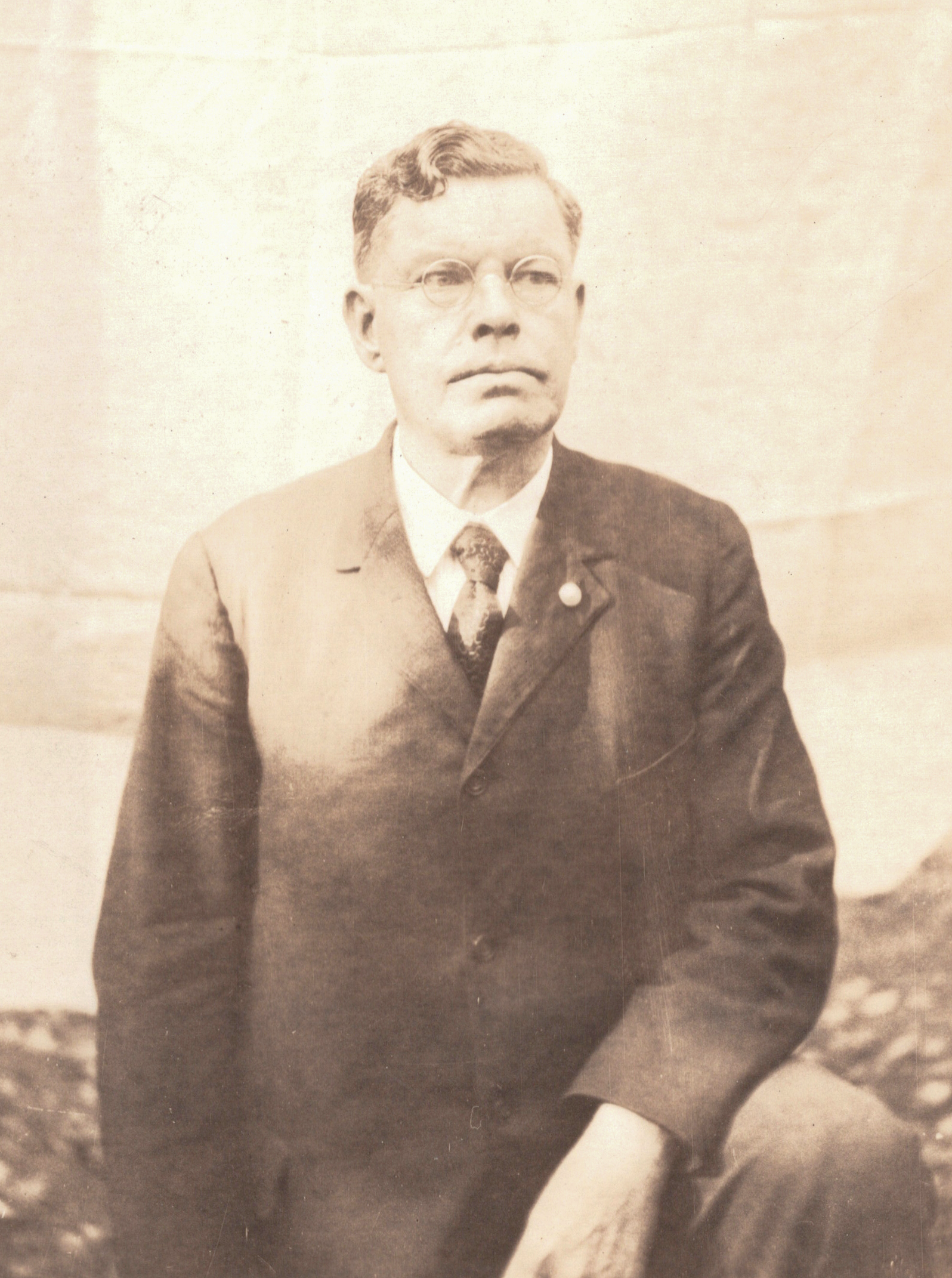
Killam in 1926

=== Plan E charter ===
Killam also played a key role in developing a new council-manager form of charter, known as Plan E by Cambridge, for the city of Cambridge. This charter includes a weak mayor elected by the City Council from among its members addition to an appointed city manager who handles day-to-day city operations. In 1938, Killam traveled throughout the Midwestern United States to research the advantages and disadvantages of this form of charter. He visited cities such as Milwaukee, Cincinnati, and Cleveland which had recently adopted this form of government. He "visited twenty-one cities and interviewed five mayors, ten city managers, twelve editors, twenty past or present city officials, three labor men, and thirteen officers of citizens' organizations." During his trip, Killam interviewed notable city leaders such as Harold Hitz Burton, Daniel Hoan, and Charles Phelps Taft II. Upon returning, he strongly recommended that Cambridge adopt this form of Council-Manager city charter and became a key contributor to its development and implementation by Cambridge in 1940. Over 80 years later, Cambridge still operates under this Plan E charter.

Later in 1946, Killam's views and foresight on traffic congestion lead him to oppose the construction of a parking garage under the Boston Common explaining that it would cater to drivers and greatly increase congestion within the city. He suggested that instead of investing in underground parking areas or highway developments, it would be more beneficial and cost-effective to focus on expanding the city's rapid transit facilities.

=== Massachusetts state housing and building laws ===
Killam was member of the committee which drafted the Massachusetts town housing law known as the Tenement House Act for Towns (Chapter 635 of 1912) which was passed in amended form into law by the 133rd Massachusetts General Court and adopted and enforced by towns throughout the state. The same committee, with some changes and additions, drafted a law for Massachusetts cities for the following year and was called the Tenement House Act for Cities (Chapter 786 of 1913). It was passed into law by the 134th Massachusetts General Court and adopted and enforced by cities throughout the state.

In 1913, Killam was appointed by Massachusetts Governor Eugene Foss to a commission to investigate the regulations throughout the Commonwealth relative to the construction, alteration, and maintenance of buildings and to develop a State building law. This commission also worked to investigate building laws and fire conditions in the State of Massachusetts. In 1915, this commission submitted a report which laid out a new state-wide building code relating to fireproofing districts to be adopted and enforced throughout Massachusetts. Despite the extensive work by the commission, this state building code failed legislative approval by the 136th Massachusetts General Court.

In 1930, Killam was appointed to the advisory committee which helped the New England Building Officials Conference write a model code for New England. This model code resulted in a new code for Boston.

=== Public and low-cost housing ===
Killam was also an advocate for public and low-cost housing within the city of Cambridge. He believed that such housing projects should prioritize the improvement of living conditions for many people in the future, rather than providing extravagant accommodations for a select few. He argued that eliminating middlemen's profits was crucial in achieving truly low-cost housing. Additionally, Killam believed that housing progress should not be hindered by the inability to immediately provide for the lowest levels of the low-wage group, as this was a relief problem rather than a housing problem.

According to Killam, large-scale rental projects were the way forward for successful housing policy. However, he acknowledged that managing such projects would require specialized training and expertise beyond that commonly found in the country. In particular, a manager of a large-scale low-cost housing project must possess skills in dealing with diverse races and social problems, as well as the ability to guide without dictation, and manage a complex team of employees with varied duties.

In 1940, Killam wrote a letter to Massachusetts Senator Henry Cabot Lodge regarding the creation of the United States Housing Administration and low-cost housing projects. Killam argued that the government should pay for the amortization and interest of loans for low-cost housing projects instead of relying on income generated by the projects. He also contended that land should not be overly restricted for development to facilitate slum clearances, and subsidies for low-cost housing projects should be economically feasible. He also stated that technical information and practical experience should inform housing policy, and localities should be provided with information to make their own decisions. Lodge read this letter to the 76th U.S. Congress during its third session.

== Consulting, design, and restoration work ==
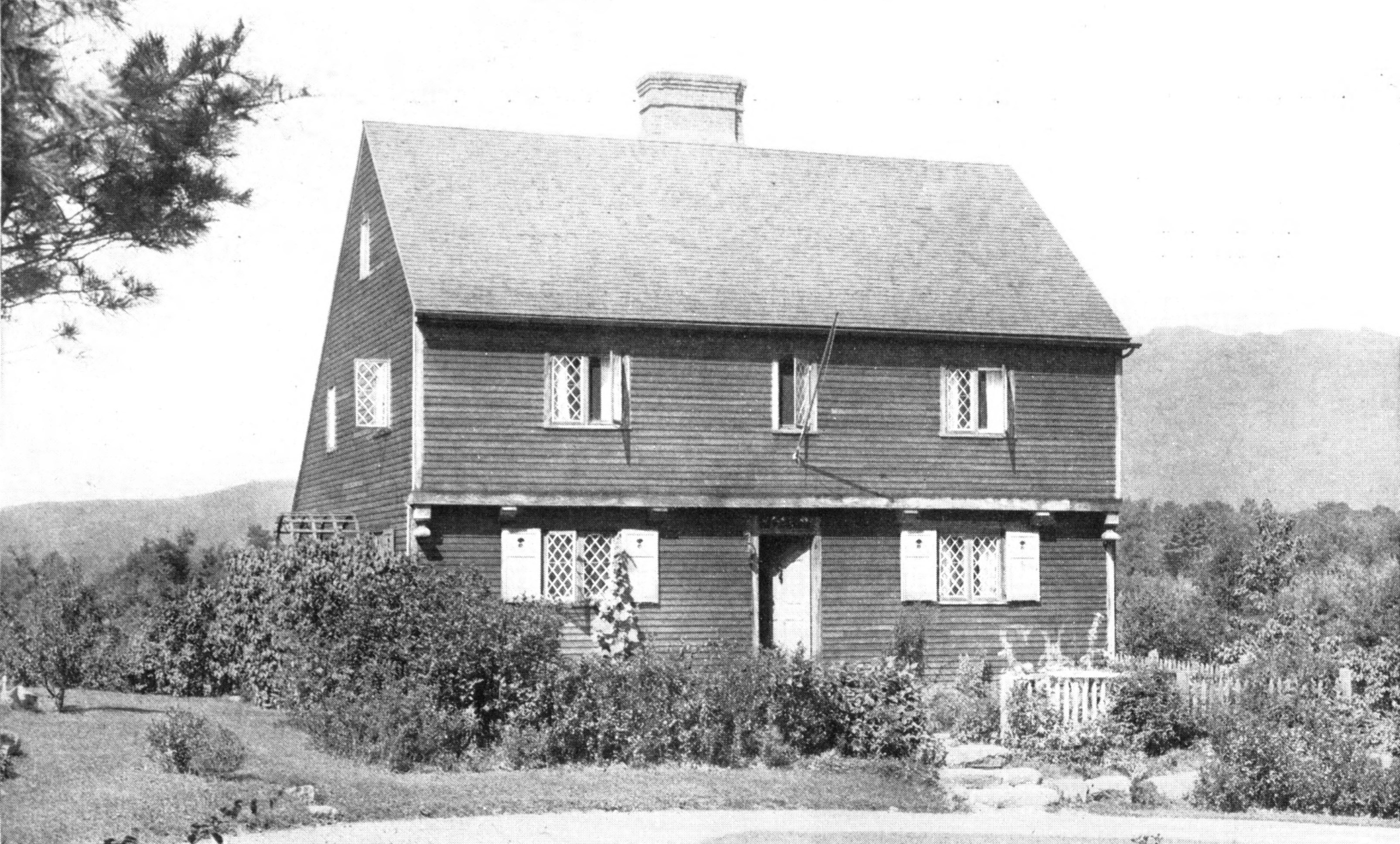
Emery house in Jaffrey.

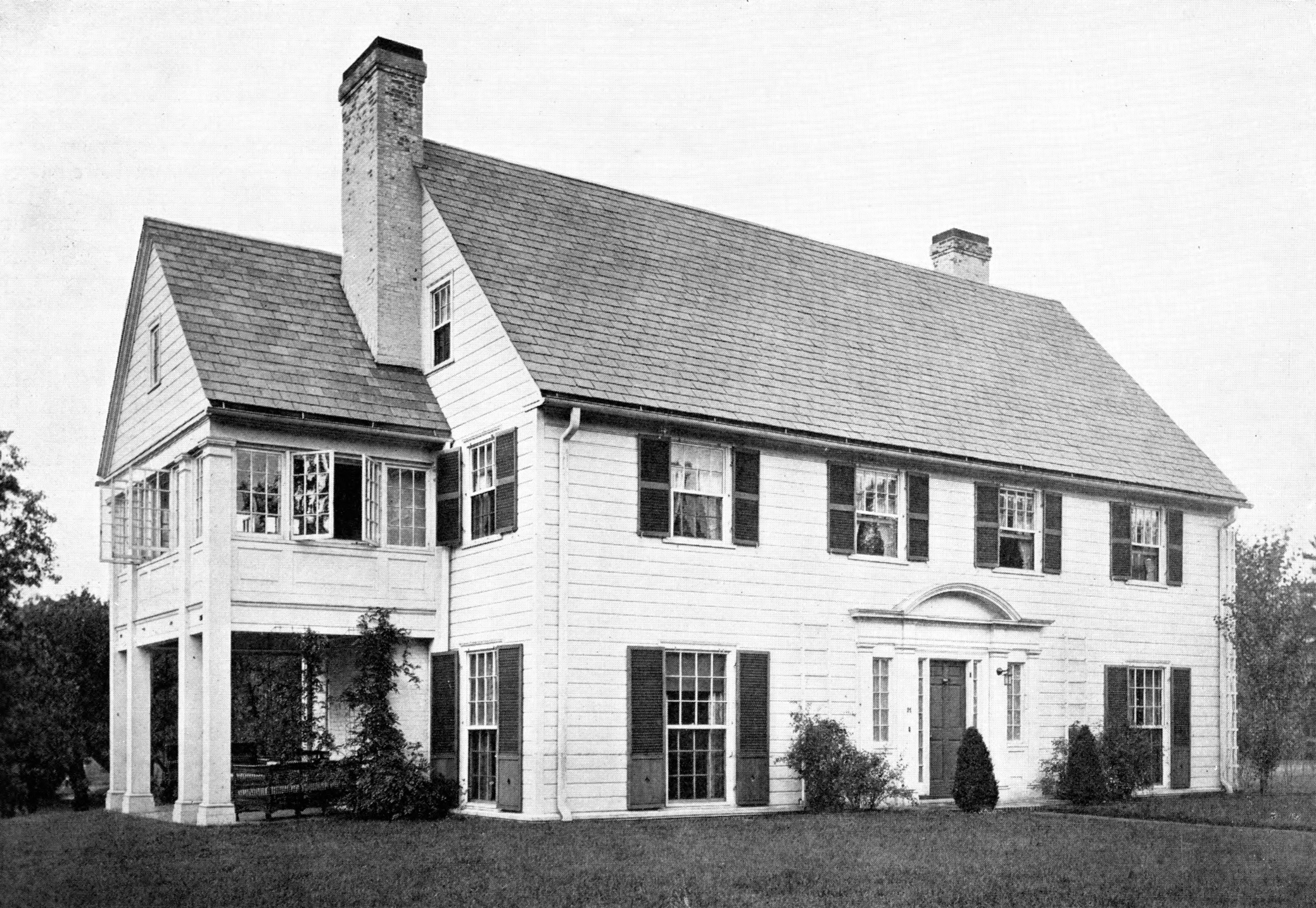
Wales house in Newton.

Killam's consulting services, structural design, and restoration work were sought by many due to his knowledge and thoroughness in the field. In the early 20th century, Killam designed several residential houses around New England with architects Henry Atherton Frost and Bremer Whidden Pond. Together they designed houses such as the Quincy W. Wales house at 21 Sylvan Avenue in Newton, Massachusetts and the Georgia H. Emery house at 12 Blackberry Lane in the Jaffrey Center Historic District of Jaffrey, New Hampshire. Both houses were featured in House Beautiful.

=== Harvard Business School ===
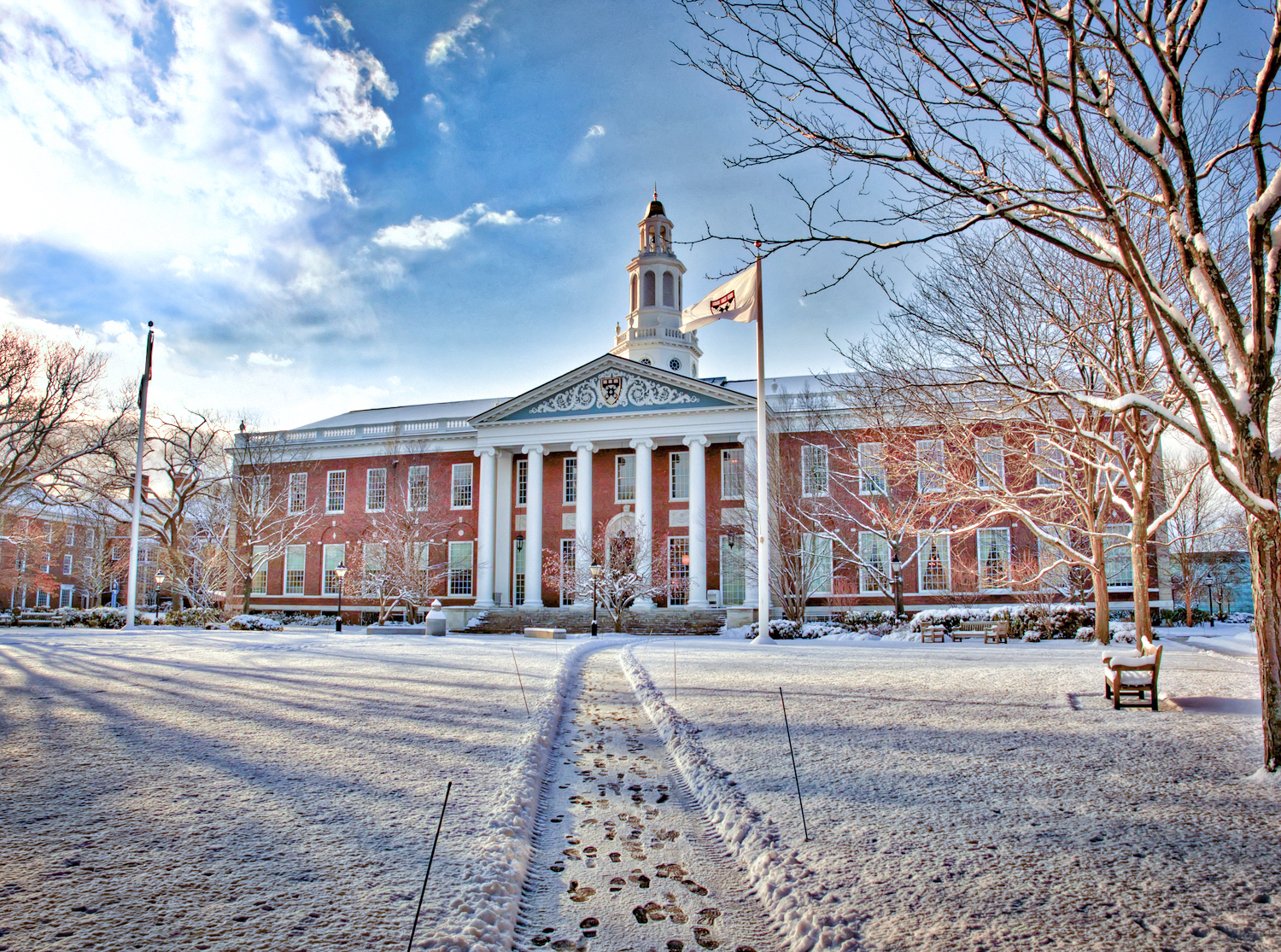
Harvard's Baker Library

During the 1920s, Killam became the consulting architect and professional advisor for the numerous new buildings being constructed during the expansion of the Harvard Business School. Most notably, Killam was professional advisor for the design competition for the school's new library, and the consulting architect for the school's new Baker Library which had been designed by McKim, Mead & White and completed in 1927.

His contributions to the planning and design of the new buildings at the school made him "one of the most devoted workers behind the scenes" for this project. Killam additionally served as supervising architect along with Wallace Brett Donham for the construction of many of the school's other new buildings.

=== Case method classroom ===
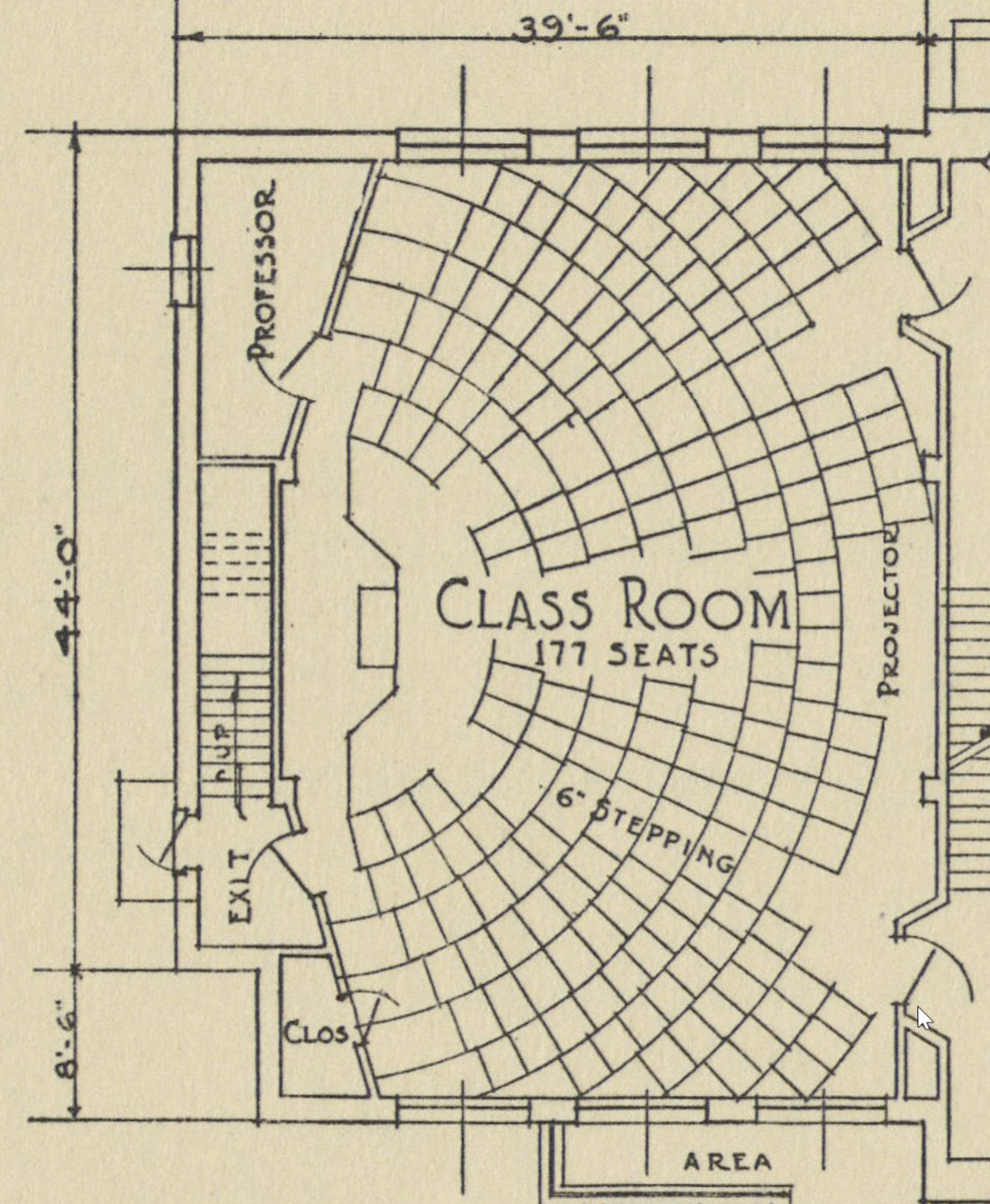
Killam's case method classroom

In 1925, in preparation for the Harvard Business School's expansion, Killam and architecture student Harry J. Korslund designed a 177-seat, horseshoe-shaped classroom with 6-inch tiers that would support the case method of teaching. The case method was a new approach to business education that involved a more interactive and participatory format compared to the traditional lecture format. The Harvard Business School played a central role in developing this method and refining the corresponding classroom design. In 1927 when the school moved to Allston, the case method classroom design by Killam and Korslund was built in the basement of the Baker Library. Although primitive with poor acoustics and lighting and wooden tablet-arm chairs, this case method classroom design was the first deliberate design of a space for business education in the country.

=== Mount Vernon ===
Killam performing restoration work at Mount Vernon (1932).

On several occasions between 1932 and 1935, Killam was contracted to advise and perform extensive restoration and structural strengthening work at George Washington's Mount Vernon estate in Virginia. In correspondence with the Mount Vernon Ladies' Association, which considered him a "renowned structural expert," Killam noted that "too much emphasis has been placed upon keeping the externals looking like a prosperous modern estate and too little care and money have been spent in thorough repairs and strengthening." Killam expressed his devotion to the preservation and restoration of the estate through his exchanges with the estate's resident superintendent Harrison Howell Dodge:

I should insist upon designing and supervising every detail and connection because it would be dangerous to leave any such details to a carpenter or iron worker. I would not allow the building to be weakened by the ignorance or carelessness of any workman. Mt. Vernon is the most precious private house in the country and every precaution for its preservation should be worked out carefully.

Killam's work included examining the mansion's structural stress and installing necessary reinforcements, termite-proofing the outer walls with copper, and placing steel beams in the mansion's basement to reinforce its structure which "remain strong and reliable today." Upon completion of his work at the main mansion, Killam claimed the building was "thrice as strong as when originally constructed." In addition to the main mansion, Killam also performed restoration and strengthening work on the other structures on the estate including the barn, quarters, spinning house, banquet hall, gardener's and butler's houses, and the office building.

=== Dorchester Heights Monument ===
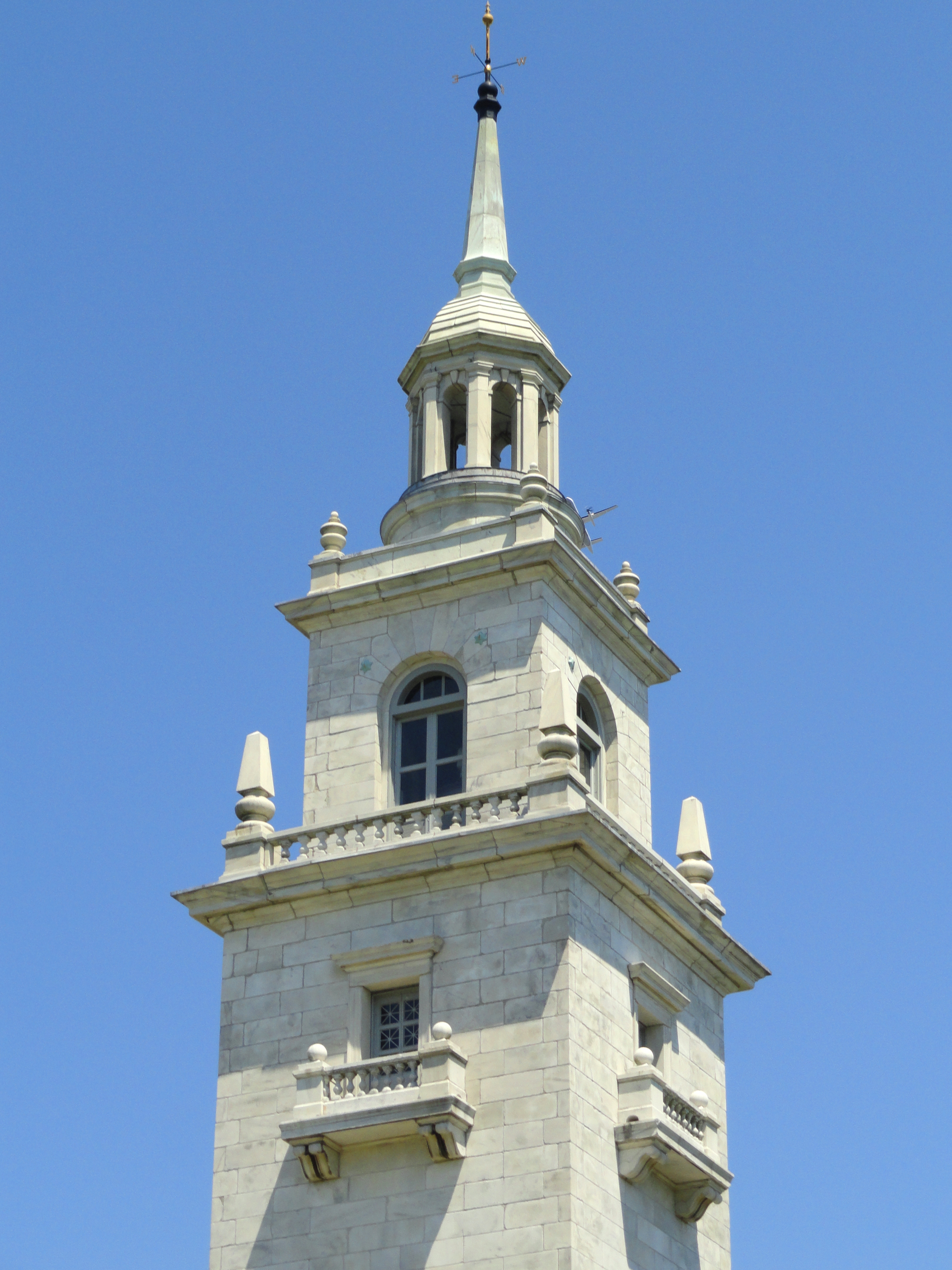
Dorchester Heights Monument

In 1934–1935, Killam altered and performed structural rehabilitation to the Dorchester Heights Monument. Under the supervision of the Boston Art Commission, Killam undertook the "first documented program to repair the monument" since its completion in 1902. This monument was originally designed by Peabody & Stearns in 1899 while he was working there. His work to the monument included constructing a new steel and concrete floor below the tower chamber, reinforcing the monument with tie rods and structural framing, and strengthening badly rusted steel beams. In addition he also weatherproofed the structure by adding flashing, protective coatings, and weatherstripping as well as installing windows and doors in the originally open arches.

=== Other works ===
In 1930, Killam and architect Eleanor Raymond performed a complete renovation of the Little Theatre at the Gloucester School on Rocky Neck in Gloucester, Massachusetts. Together, they expanded the stage, extended the gallery, and added promenades and porches to the facility.

In 1935, Robert E. Greenwood, mayor of Fitchburg, Massachusetts, hired Killam as consulting architect for a new high school. Killam was recommended to the school and planning boards by Professor Henry Vincent Hubbard who was serving as advisor to the school committee at the time. This new building was to replace the old high school which had burned down in 1934. The new Fitchburg High School was completed in 1937 and designed by Coolidge, Shepley, Bulfinch and Abbott.

== Marriage and children ==
Charles and Amy (1892)

On August 6, 1894, at the First Baptist Church in Hyde Park, Killam married Amy Edna Whittemore, a classmate from his early education in Hyde Park. Whittemore was born in 1871 in Londonderry, New Hampshire, but grew up and went to school in Hyde Park with Killam. She was the youngest daughter of Henry Joshua Whittemore, a music teacher at Hyde Park High School, (Note: Henry Whittemore conducted a chorus at the high school which Killam and Amy Whittemore were both members of. Whittemore's siblings Willis and Mary were also members of the group.) and Esther Miranda Goodwin. Together, Killam and Whittemore had four children:

- Muriel Esther Killam (1895–1988)
- Horace Goodwin Killam (1896–1989)
- Roger Wilson Killam (1898–1987)
- Mary Whittemore Killam (1903–1993)

While he devoted much of his time to academic pursuits and professional endeavors, he remained a committed family man, having great affection for his wife and four children, and later, his grandchildren and great-grandchildren.

== Death ==
Charles Wilson Killam died in a Providence, Rhode Island hospital on May 19, 1961, at the age of 89. He was living in Rumford, Rhode Island at the time of his death. He was buried at Shawsheen Cemetery in Bedford, Massachusetts alongside his wife, who predeceased him. He was survived by two sisters, his four children, and several grandchildren and great-grandchildren.

== Published works ==
Killam's farmhouse sketch for a competition in The Brickbuilder magazine (1900).

Killam was a prolific and assiduous writer of numerous articles published in professional journals, academic magazines, and periodicals, and authored several texts on architectural construction. These were pioneering in the field of architecture and architectural construction. Despite publication, Killam never regarded his works as being in final form. He would not permit them being published as hardcover books, believing that this would limit the potential for further development of its content.

Killam's 1937 textbook, Notes on Architectural Construction, was widely used in architectural schools throughout the United States and became a core part of their curricula, lectures, and instruction. Some of his notable published articles, works, and reports include:

A tower with openings surmounted by an octagonal spire. Sketch from Killam's 1937 textbook on architectural construction.

- "Bridge Design from the Architect's Standpoint" – Harvard Engineering Journal. (1909)
- "The Charles River Bridges" – Harvard Engineering Journal. (1910)
- "The Relation of a State-Wide Building Code to Housing and Town Planning" – Architectural quarterly of Harvard University. (1913)
- "Report Relative to the Construction, Alteration and Maintenance of Buildings" (1915)
- "Study of Construction in Architectural Education" – The Architectural Forum. (1922)
- Harvard University's Baker Library Architectural Competition Program (1924)
- "Apartments and Automobiles" – The Cambridge Tribune. (1928)
- "Modern Construction and its Possible Determination of Style Forms" – American Institute of Architects: Journal of Proceedings. (1930)
- "Modern Design as Influenced by Modern Materials" – The Architectural Forum. (1930)
- "Why Architects Tend to Specify Substitutes for Lumber in Buildings of Today" – American Lumberman. (1930)
- "Design in its Relation to Construction" – The Journal of the American Institute of Architects. (1935)
- "Plea for Beauty" – Architect & Engineer. (1935)
- "Low-Cost Housing In The United States" – Harvard Business Review. (1936)
- "Architectural Construction Part One: Notes on Architectural Construction" (1937)
- "School Training for Architecture: Some Pertinent Thoughts on Education" – Pencil Points. (1937)
- "Appropriations for the United States Housing Administration" – United States of America Senate Congressional Record. (1940)
- "Are Planners Prepared to Build Our Cities?" – Pencil Points. (1942)
- "City Planning And Blighted Areas" – Michigan Society of Architects. (1943)
- "The Education of Practicing Architects" – Journal of The American Institute of Architects. (1949)
- "Architectural Construction Part Two: Design of Masonry and Foundations" (1950)

== Accomplishments and positions held ==
Throughout his academic and professional career, Killam held various positions of leadership and served on numerous boards and committees. He was also a member of several clubs and institutions, and collaborated closely with many notable and influential architects and academics of his time. The Massachusetts State Association of Architects awarded Killam with their Certificate of Honor in 1946 and wrote the following about him:

Architect, engineer, and educator, whose wise, resourceful, energetic teaching and practical experience gave to the greater advantage of the student the principles of sound architectural engineering and construction; who by his writing and courageous participation in public and architectural affairs, has inspired the confidence and respect of the profession.

=== Memberships ===
Throughout his life, Killam was member of numerous clubs, associations, societies, and institutes both academic and professional in nature. Some of which include:

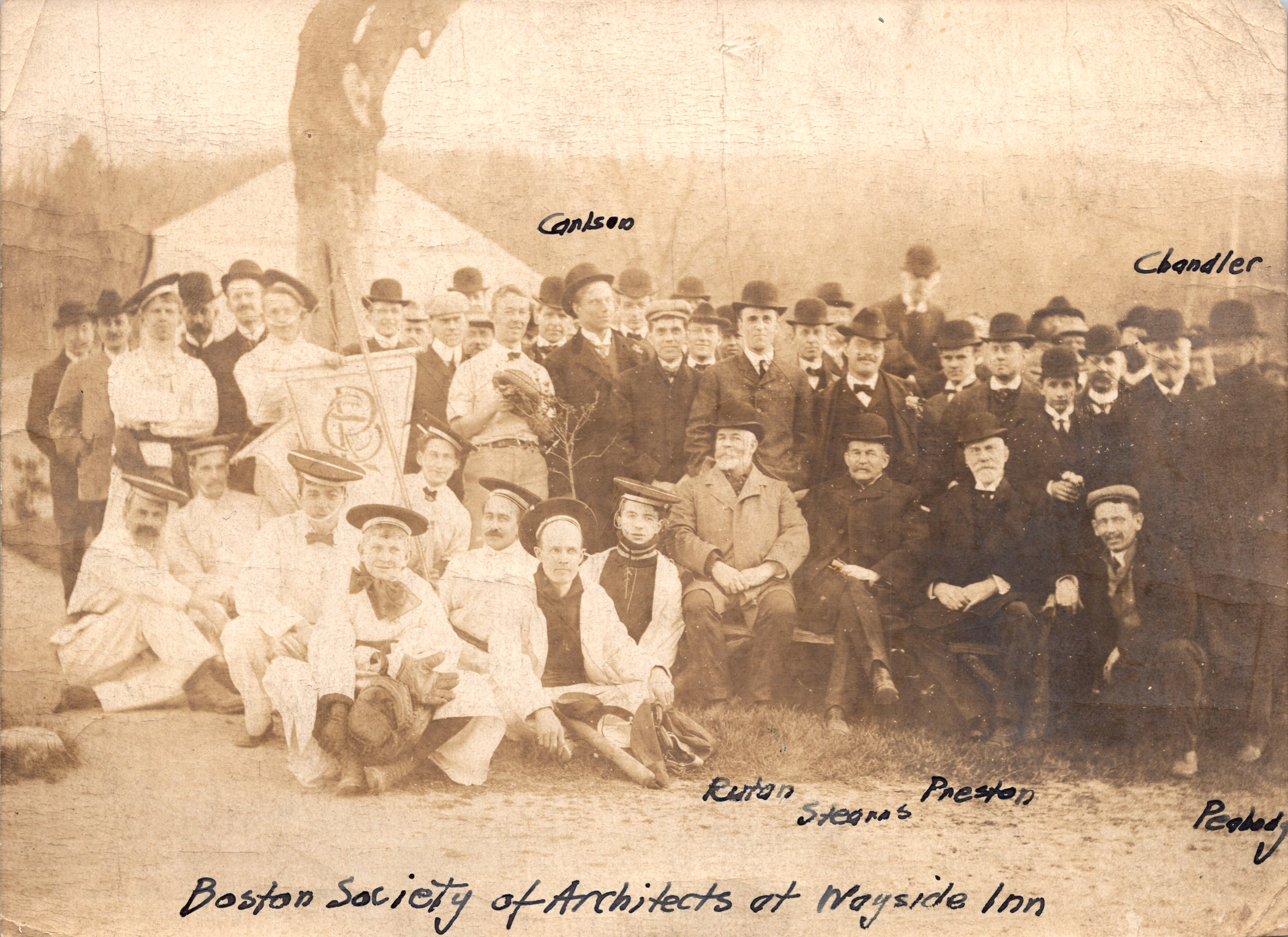
Boston Society of Architects at Wayside Inn (c. 1908). Killam seen standing behind Stearns. (Note: Architects Pictured: Charles Hercules Rutan, John Goddard Stearns Jr., William G. Preston, Joseph Everett Chandler, and Robert Swain Peabody.)

- Became member of the American Institute of Architects (AIA) in 1913.
- Elected a Fellow of the American Institute of Architects (FAIA) in 1926.
- American Society of Civil Engineers (Note: Killam became associate member of the society in 1907, member in 1913, and life member in 1942.)
- Boston Architectural Club
- Boston Society of Architects
- National Fire Protection Association (Note: Killam was the first architect officer of the association's Boston chapter.)
- American Concrete Institute (Note: Killam was also a member of the institute's Reinforced Concrete and Building Law committee in 1916.)
- Active member of President Hoover's Conference on Home Building and Home Ownership and the Correlating Committee on Legislation and Administration (1931).
- Cambridge Club—Elected director of the club in 1928, vice-president in 1934, and president in 1935.
- Director and President of the Cambridge Taxpayers' League (1932).
- Harvard Faculty Club
- Elected to a fellowship in the American Academy of Art and Sciences.

=== Chairmanships ===
Killam chaired many committees, commissions, and bodies throughout his career. Some notable positions he was chairman for include:

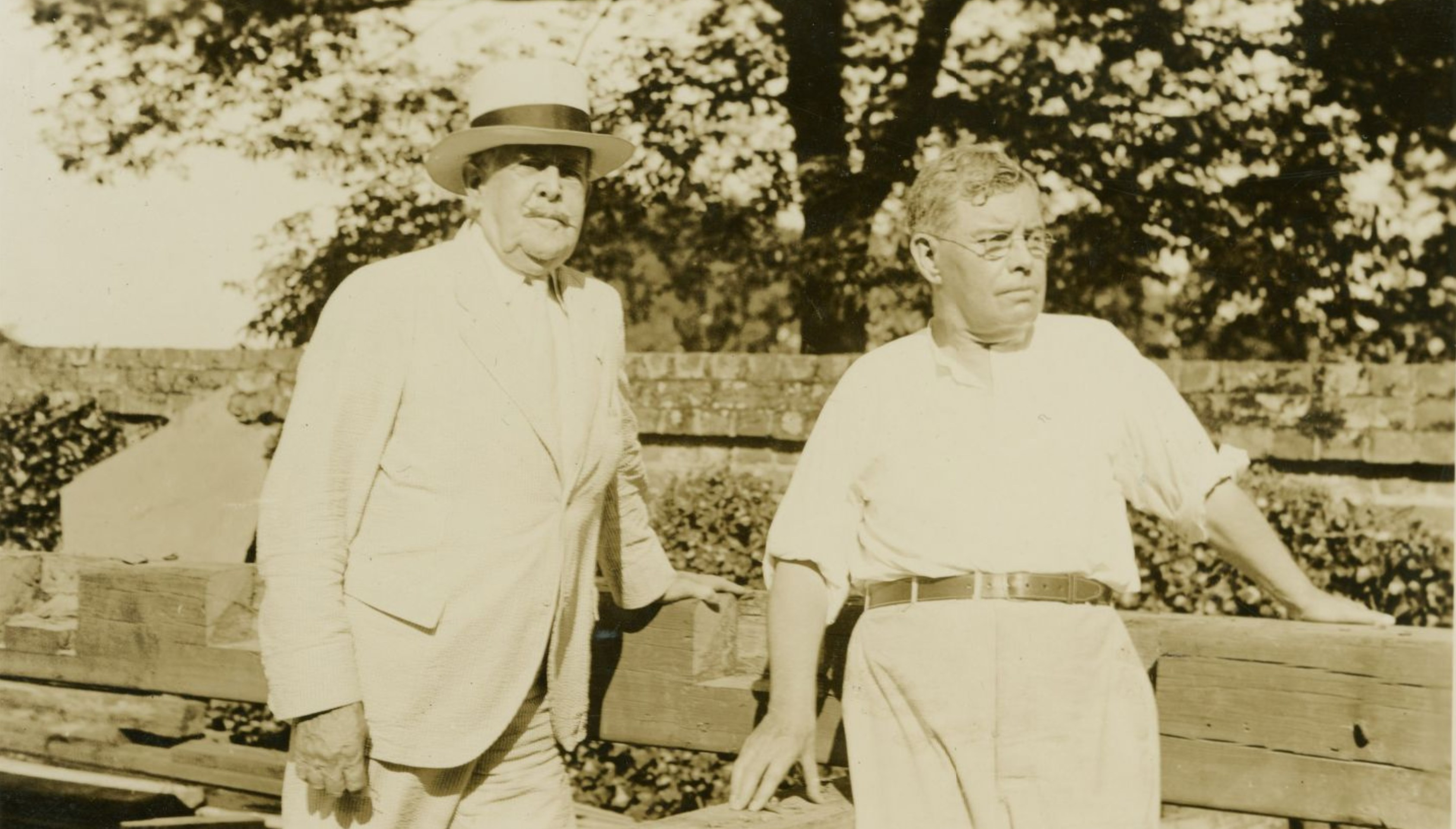
Killam with Mount Vernon Superintendent Harrison H. Dodge on the estate (1934).

- Cambridge Public School Association committee on school plant (1910–1911).
- AIA Basic Building Code Committee (1916).
- Special commission to revise the building ordinance of Cambridge (1917).
- Chairman of the Faculty of Architecture at Harvard (1917).
- Chairman of the Council of the School of Architecture at Harvard (1918).
- Boston Society of Architects committee of materials and methods (1930).
- Served as both chairman and director Cambridge Industrial Association Municipal Affairs Committee (1932).
- AIA committee on structural service (1940).
- Vice-chairman of the AIA committee on building costs and committee on cost of materials (1940).
- AIA committee on the technical services of the American Institute of Architects (1941).

=== Committees ===
Some of the other notable committees Killam was a member of include:

Mount Vernon Director Charles Wall with Killam (1934)

- Council and executive committee of the Harvard University School of Engineering (1912–1913). (Note: Other members of the council and committee included professors Comfort A. Adams, Emory Leon Chaffee, Harvey N. Davis, Ira Nelson Hollis, Edward Vermilye Huntington, Arthur E. Kennelly, G. W. Pierce, Lionel Simeon Marks, George Fillmore Swain, and George C. Whipple.)
- Cambridge Unemployment Relief Committee (1933). (Note: Committee formed by Harvard faculty to financially aid the local community during the Great Depression. Other notable members on the committee were: Edwin H. Hall (chairman), Mary Almy, Cornelia James Cannon, Walter Bradford Cannon, Richard B. Carter, Thomas Nixon Carver, John H. Corcoran, Edward A. Counihan, Frederick W. Dallinger, Rev. Angus Dun, Timothy W. Good, Rev. Frederic C. Lawrence, John D. Lynch, Calvert Magruder, G. W. Pierce, Richard M. Russell, Sumner Slichter, and Robert Walcott.)
- American Standards Association committee on methods of testing wood (1940).

=== Representative ===
Killam also acted as a representative for the AIA and other groups on various committees, some of which include:

- One of fourteen delegates of the Boston AIA Chapter—Joseph Everett Chandler, Ralph Adams Cram, Henry H. Kendall, and Arthur W. Rice were other notable delegates of the chapter.
- Represented the AIA on the following committees:
  - U.S. Forest Service and American Society for Testing Materials committee on standardization of methods of testing wood (called the American Engineering Standards Committee) (1922).
  - Committee of technical groups and government agencies engaged in the preparation and promulgation of codes and standards relating to the design and construction of buildings (1933).
  - Joint Committee on Standard Specifications for Concrete and Reinforced Concrete (1940).
  - Central Agency Committee, cooperating with The Producers' Council Inc., and the Federal Home Loan Bank Board (1940).

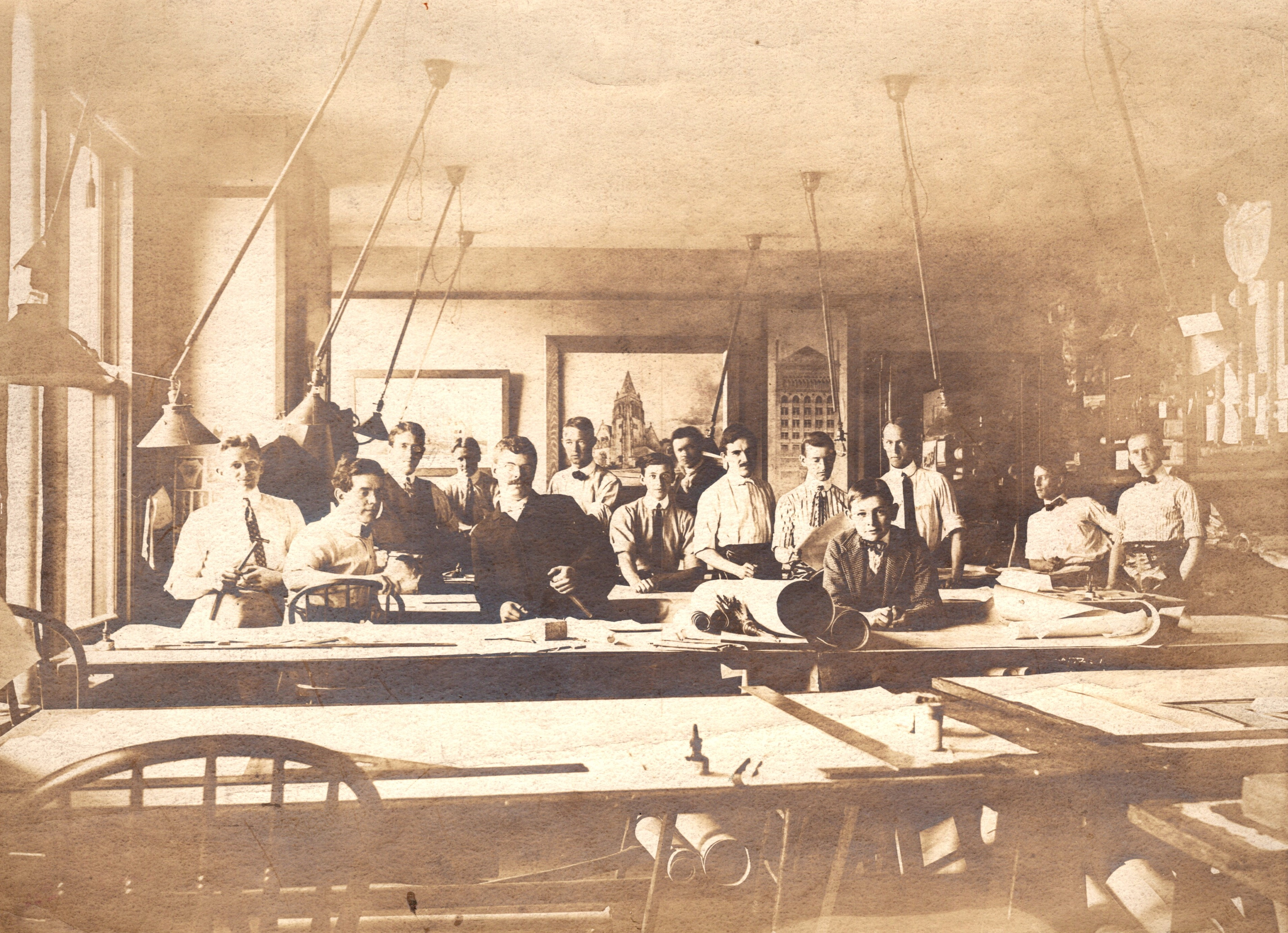
Peabody & Stearns office (c. 1900). Killam first row, third from the left. (Note: Architect Charles R. Greco is also seen sitting second from the left.)

=== Appointments and other positions held ===
Killam was appointed to many positions by various academic and political individuals and held numerous other positions at the city, state, and national level. Some of these appointments and other positions include:

- Appointed associate of the Harvard University Engineering Journal Board (1912–1913).
- Appointed to the jury for the national "Better Homes in America" design competition sponsored by General Electric and The Architectural Forum (1935). Ralph T. Walker, Franklin O. Adams, and Eliel Saarinen were also jurors.
- Judge for the Jordan Marsh Company Architects' Contest along with Helen Storrow and William Emerson (1935).
- Director of the Program of Cooperation between the Federal Home Loan Bank Board and AIA to construct well-designed, well-built, well-equipped, low-cost housing (1940).
