= Florence Luscomb =

American architect

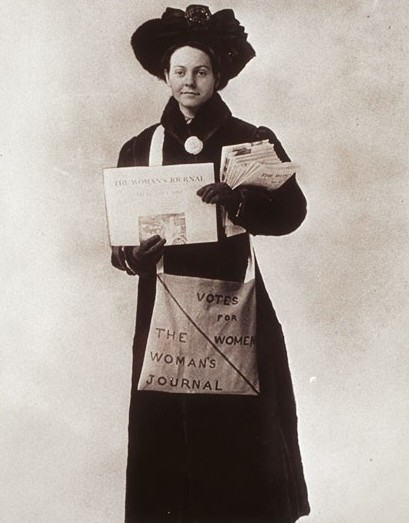
- Florence Luscomb selling The Woman's Journal, 1911
- Born: Florence Hope Luscomb; February 6, 1887; Lowell, Massachusetts, US
- Died: October 13, 1985 (aged 98); Emerson Convalescent Home in Watertown, Massachusetts, US
- Occupations: Architect, activist for woman suffrage
- Known for: Degrees in architecture 1909, 1910 from MIT

Florence Hope Luscomb (February 6, 1887 – October 13, 1985) was an American architect and women's suffrage activist in Massachusetts. She was one of the first ten women graduated from the Massachusetts Institute of Technology. Her degrees were in architecture. Luscomb became a partner in an early woman-owned architecture firm before work in the field became scarce during World War I. She then dedicated herself fully to activism in the women's suffrage movement, becoming a prominent leader of Massachusetts suffragists.

== Early life ==
Luscomb was born in Lowell, Massachusetts, the daughter of Hannah Skinner (Knox) and Otis Luscomb. Her father was an unsuccessful artist. Her mother was a dedicated suffragist and women's rights activist. When Florence was one and a half years old, her parents separated and she moved with her mother to Boston, while her older brother, Otis Kerro Luscomb, lived with their father. Raised solely by her mother, she was able to attend a private secondary school (Chauncy Hall). Her mother Hannah had received inheritance from her maternal grandmother and this enabled her to pursue her own causes. As a child in Boston, she went with her mother to women's suffrage events, at one point seeing Susan B. Anthony speak. She became an ardent suffragist, initially by selling a pro-suffrage newspaper on the street.

== Education and early career ==
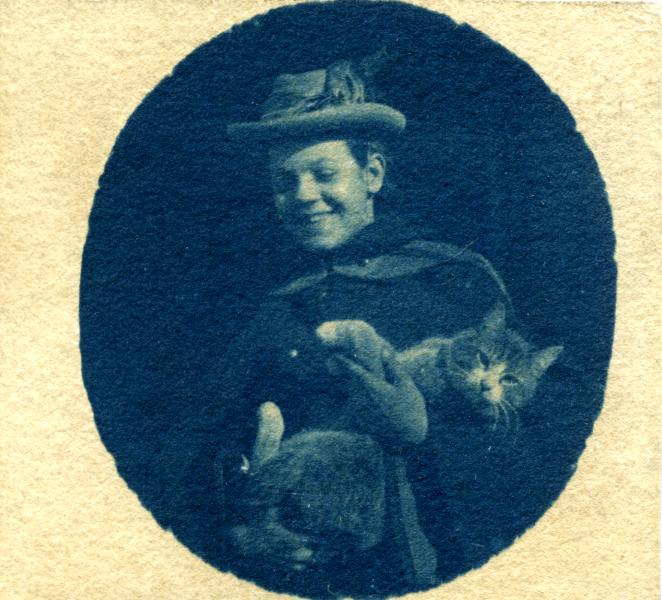
Florence Luscomb holding her cat, Needles, c. 1893

Luscomb was among the first ten women to earn a degree in architecture from the Massachusetts Institute of Technology. Women still experienced significant challenges during her tenure there. For example, Luscomb had to inquire at twelve firms before one of them would hire her for an internship after her second year.

Following her graduation, she was hired by Ida Annah Ryan, the sixth woman to earn an architecture degree from M.I.T. Later, she would become a partner in Ryan's firm. Ryan and Luscomb shared an interest in women's suffrage and Ryan gave Luscomb a degree of flexibility at work that allowed her to be active in the women's suffrage movement. During this time, Luscomb helped organize various events for the suffrage movement and, during a public debate on adding a suffrage amendment to the state constitution, gave more than 200 speeches in 14 weeks.

She later continued her education in architecture at the newly opened Cambridge School of Architecture and Landscape Architecture in 1916.

In addition to her work with Ryan, she began working with local architect Henry Atherton Frost and landscape architect Bremer Whidden Pond. Due to the entrance of the United States into World War I in 1917, new construction slumped and her architectural career was put on hiatus.

== New career begun during WWI ==
portrait photograph, circa 1922

Luscomb accepted a position as executive secretary for the Boston Equal Suffrage Association for Good Government. She went on to work for a number of organizations in the Boston area, including the Boston chapters of the League of Women Voters, the Women's International League for Peace and Freedom, and organizations dedicated to prison reform and factory safety. She was a charter member of the League of Women Voters, formed once women gained the vote. Luscomb also helped found a local of the United Office and Professional Workers of America and served as a volunteer with the local NAACP and ACLU. From 1911, she considered herself a citizen of the world, traveling to nations across Europe and Asia for conferences, yet she retained pride in her Yankee heritage. Her political views were well-developed and unique.

Upon her mother's death in 1933, Luscomb inherited enough money that she could dedicate her time fully to activism. She ran for public office four times, more to make her causes visible than to win. She nearly won the first race she entered, for Boston Council in 1922. Her campaigns for races for Congress in 1936 and 1950 and for governor in 1952 were largely in protest. An ardent anti-McCarthyist, she was at one point called to testify before a committee in the Massachusetts legislature that was investigating communism. She wrote an early anti-Vietnam War leaflet and later, would advise some of the founders of the American feminist movement, encouraging them to include the poor and women of color.

Luscomb designed her own holiday cabin in Tamworth, New Hampshire. After WWII and until the 1970s, she spent her summers there, contributing to the Appalachian Mountain Club.

She had lived in various cooperative houses after her mother's death, including a Cambridge cooperative house at 64 Wendell Street. Luscomb lived there until 1980, when she moved into an elder-care facility in Watertown, Massachusetts, where she died October 13, 1985, at age 98.

== Commemorations ==
In 1999 a commemorative series of six tall marble panels with a bronze bust in each was added to the Massachusetts State House. The busts are of Luscomb, Dorothea Dix, Mary Kenney O'Sullivan, Josephine St. Pierre Ruffin, Sarah Parker Remond, and Lucy Stone. As well, two quotations from each of those women (including Luscomb) are etched on their individual marble panel, and the wall behind all the panels has wallpaper designed with six government documents repeated over and over, with each document being related to a cause of one or more of the women.

She is commemorated on the Boston Women's Heritage Trail.

=== Quotation ===
“There is no end to what you can accomplish if (or when) you don’t care who gets the credit.”
