= Cambridge School of Architecture and Landscape Architecture =

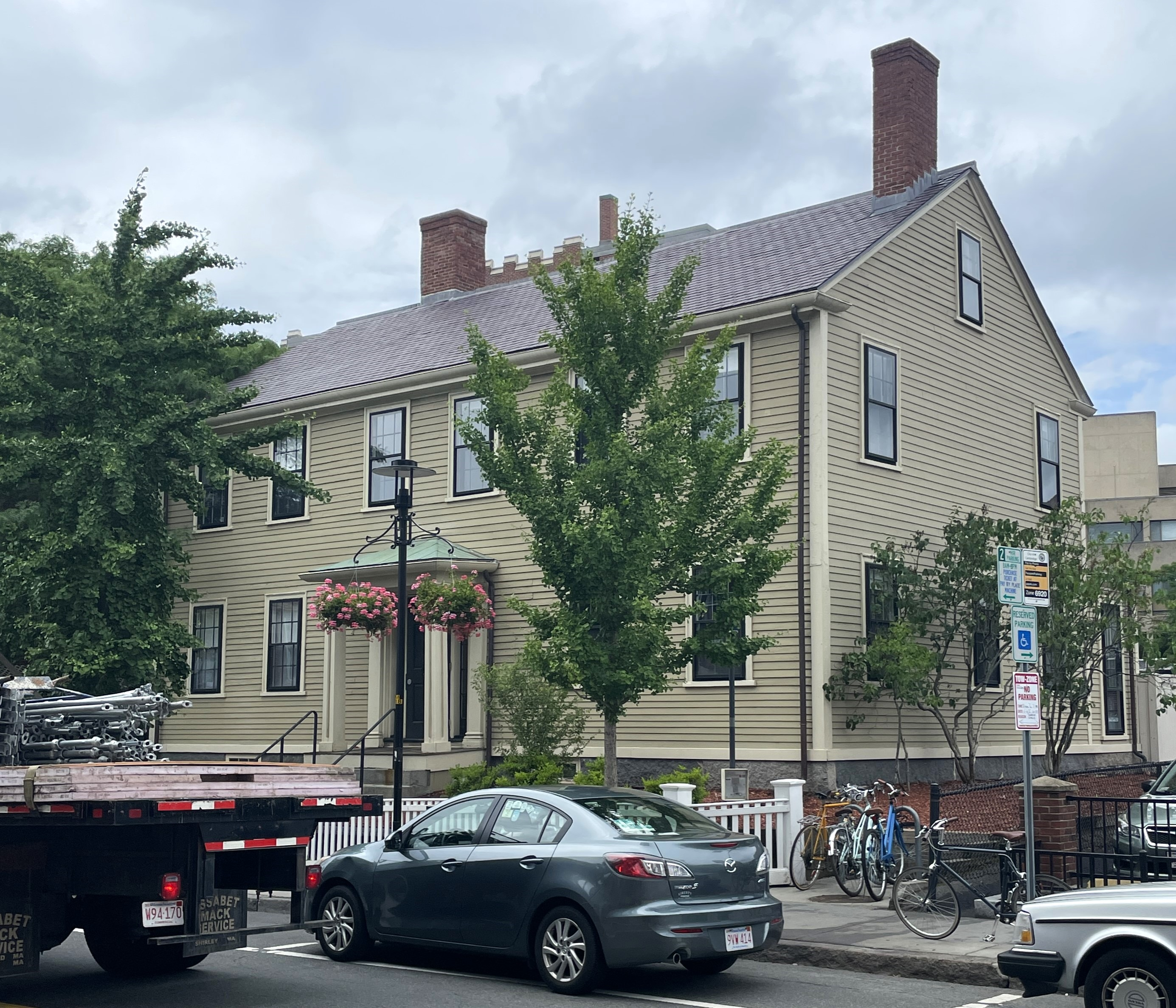
- School's building on Church St.

Location
- 53 Church Street; Cambridge, Massachusetts; United States

Information
- Former names: Cambridge School of Architectural and Landscape Design for Women (1916–1919); Cambridge School of Domestic and Landscape Architecture for Women (1919–1932)
- School type: Architecture
- Established: 1915
- Founders: Henry Atherton Frost and Bremer Whidden Pond
- Closed: 1942
- Gender: Female
- Enrollment: 53 (1926–1927)
- Affiliation: Harvard University; 1915–1932; Smith College; 1932–1942

The Cambridge School of Architecture and Landscape Architecture—previously known as the Cambridge School of Architectural and Landscape Design for Women and then as Cambridge School of Domestic and Landscape Architecture for Women—was an educational institution for women that existed from 1915 to 1942. It was the first school to offer women graduate training in the professions of architecture and landscape architecture under a single faculty. It was affiliated originally with Harvard University and later with Smith College. From 1928 to 1942, the school was located at 53 Church Street in Cambridge, Massachusetts.

== Founding and early history ==
In 1915 a recent graduate of Radcliffe College, Katherine Brooks, who intended to study landscape architecture at the Lowthorpe School of Landscape Architecture, wanted to begin by taking architectural drafting at Harvard but was refused entry because the school did not admit women. Brooks consulted with the school's head, James Sturgis Pray, who then arranged for architectural design professor Henry Atherton Frost to tutor Brooks privately. Somewhat to his surprise, Frost found his unexpected pupil an adept and enthusiastic student, and in an account of the school's founding he wrote: "Teaching a woman what we had always considered strictly a man's job was not the painful ordeal it had promised to be."

Within a year, Frost had four women students and another professor, landscape architect Bremer Whidden Pond, had come on board. Even though the women followed the same curriculum as their male peers, Harvard students tended to dismiss the school with belittling terms such as the "Little School" and the "Frost and Pond Day Nursery".

Word about the informal program spread, and by the 1916–17 academic year, the college was advertising the experimental program and its curriculum as the Cambridge School of Architectural and Landscape Design for Women. In its first few years, the school had from 9 to 12 women students. The first two women to complete the school's three-year program were Brooks and landscape architect Rose Greely; another early graduate was Eleanor Raymond.

== Name change and degree-granting ==
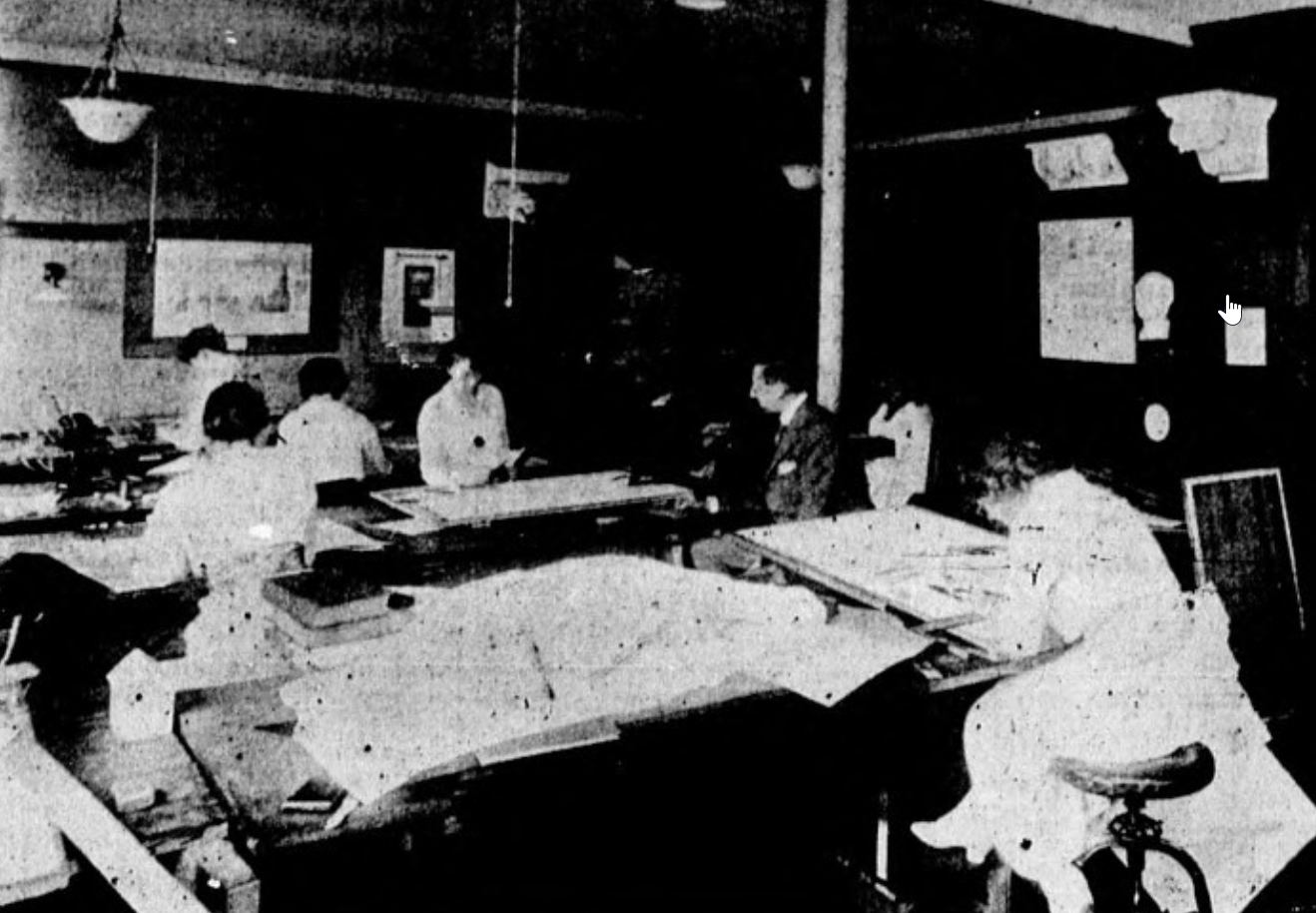
View in one of the school's drafting rooms (1919)

In 1919, the school's name was changed to the Cambridge School of Domestic and Landscape Architecture for Women, a shift that Frost later regretted for its implication that women were only suited to residential (i.e. domestic) architectural design.

A problem in the school's early years had been its inability to issue formal degrees, which are required in most states in order to register as a licensed architect. In 1924, the school formally incorporated as a separate educational institution but still did not grant degrees. Various colleges and universities were approached throughout the 1920s as possible degree-granting partners, including Harvard, Radcliffe, and Columbia University; all refused, for various reasons.

== Partnership with Smith College ==
In 1932, the school finally found a partner in Smith College and became a formal graduate school under the name Cambridge School of Architecture and Landscape Architecture. It remained independent, with its campus located in Cambridge, but by agreement with Smith College it recommended its students to the college for master's degrees in either architecture or landscape architecture. The first master's degrees were awarded in 1934, and in 1936, the school added bachelor's degrees in both subjects.

In 1938, the school became fully integrated with Smith College even though the campus still remained in Cambridge. It became known for championing modernist design, and in 1939 it celebrated its 25th anniversary with a series of lectures at the Museum of Modern Art, New York, paired with an exhibition, Houses and Housing: Industrial Arts in New York, that featured projects by the school's faculty and students.

In 1942, due to financial difficulties and lack of support from a new Smith president, Smith closed the program. That same year, women were for the first time allowed into the Harvard Graduate School of Design.

Archives of the school are housed by Smith College and contain photographs, school-issued documents and brochures, alumnae bulletins, and other material.

== Notable alumnae ==
- Lucile Council
- Elizabeth Hirsh Fleisher (Class of 1929)
- Jean B. Fletcher (Class of 1941)
- Helen French (Class of 1921)
- Florence Holmes Gerke
- Rose Greely (Class of 1919)
- Sarah P. Harkness
- Anne Gould Hauberg
- Victorine du Pont Homsey (Class of 1925)
- Alice Recknagel Ireys (Class of 1935)
- Clermont Huger Lee (Class of 1939)
- Florence Luscomb
- Cary Millholland Parker (Class of 1934)
- Ethel B. Power (Class of 1920)
- Eleanor Raymond (Class of 1919)
- Maud Sargent
- Gertrude Sawyer (Class of 1922)

== Notable faculty ==
- Henry Atherton Frost — founder of the school
- Theodora Kimball Hubbard
- Charles Wilson Killam — instructor in architectural and landscape construction, graduate theses
- Robert A. Little
- Bremer Whidden Pond — founder of the school
- Frank M. Rines — instructor in freehand drawing
- Robert Swan Sturtevant
- Herbert Langford Warren — instructor in architectural history

== See also ==
- Lowthorpe School of Landscape Architecture
