= Elizabeth Hirsh Fleisher =

American architect (1892–1975)

- Born: August 28, 1892; Philadelphia, Pennsylvania, US
- Died: June 8, 1975 (aged 82); Philadelphia, Pennsylvania, US
- Known for: Architecture
- Notable work: Parkway House in Philadelphia
- Spouse: Horace T. Fleisher

Elizabeth R. Hirsh Fleisher (August 28, 1892 – June 8, 1975) was the first female architect to pass exams to become a registered architect in Philadelphia, Pennsylvania, and the fourth woman to do so in the state.

== Early years ==
Elizabeth R. Hirsh Fleisher was born in Philadelphia on August 28, 1892, to Harry B. Hirsh, founder of Belmont Iron Works, and Minnie Rosenberg Hirsh. In 1910, she graduated from Philadelphia High School for Girls, and in 1914, she received her Bachelor of Arts from Wellesley College. During her time at college, she studied abroad at the University of Berlin between 1912 and 1913. In 1917, she served as the president of the Philadelphia Wellesley Club. In 1929, she obtained her Master of Architecture from the Cambridge School of Architecture and Landscape Architecture. Again, she studied abroad during her time at graduate school at the University of Oxford in 1928.

== Career ==
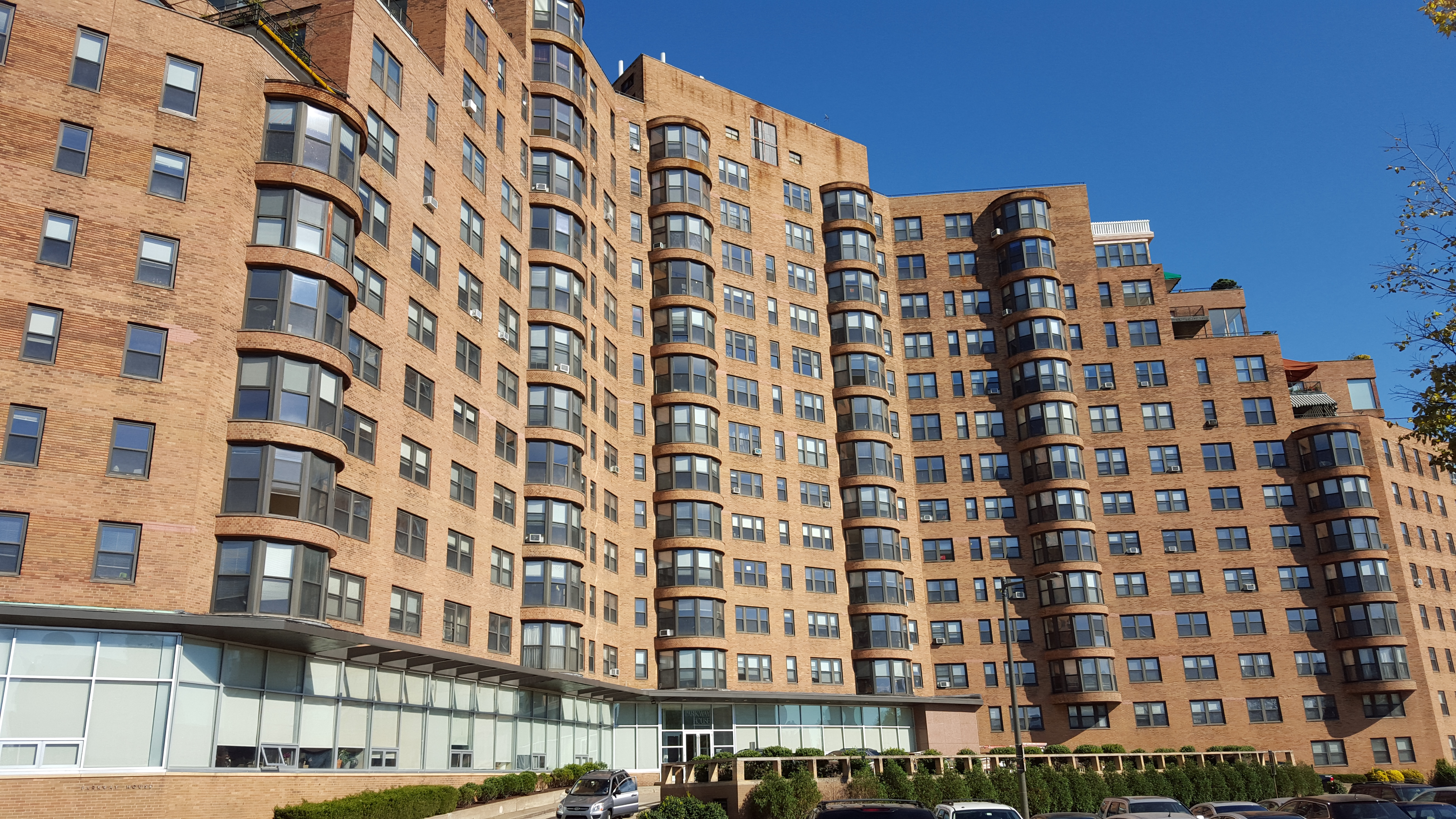
Parkway House

She partnered with Gabriel Roth in 1941 to establish Roth & Fleisher, and they worked together until she retired in 1958. They built factories, theaters, apartment buildings and automobile showrooms. She is known for designing the Parkway House in Philadelphia. Fleisher also designed a midcentury modern house for herself and her husband Horace on Apalogen Road in East Falls, Philadelphia, and a modernist stone pavilion in South Philadelphia's Columbus Square Park.

=== Parkway House ===
Fleisher was the design architect for the Parkway House. Located at 22nd Street and Pennsylvania Avenue, Parkway house was one of the first postwar luxury apartment buildings in Philadelphia. The 14-story brick clad concrete and steel building contains elements of both the Art Deco and International styles.

== Personal life ==
Elizabeth was married to landscape architect Horace Fleisher.
