= Helen French (architect) =

American architect

Helen Douglass French
- Born: 1900; Arlington, Massachusetts, US
- Died: 1994 (aged 93–94)
- Education: Cambridge School of Architecture and Landscape Architecture
- Occupation: Architect
- Spouse: Prentiss French

Helen Douglass French (1900–1994) was an American architect. She worked together and independently with her husband, landscape architect Prentiss French.

== Personal life and education ==
French was born Helen Douglass in Arlington, Massachusetts in 1900. In 1921, she earned her graduate degree in architecture at the Cambridge School of Architecture and Landscape Architecture, Massachusetts.

== Career ==
After graduating, French worked at various firms in Boston and eventually traveled to Europe, where she studied at the Ecole des Beaux Arts, returning to the United States in 1927. That year, she married Prentiss French and the couple operated a private practice in Boston and Stockbridge, Massachusetts until 1932 when they relocated to Sarasota, Florida. They worked with architect Clarence Martin for ten years while in Sarasota. The couple then moved to San Francisco when Prentiss was employed by the U.S. Army Corps of Engineers during World War II. There, French received her California certification in 1946, and they worked primarily on residential projects. The couple worked in the same office in San Francisco until the 1960s, working together and independently on projects throughout Northern California.

French was a member of the American Institute of Architecture Northern California Chapter, the SPUR, the San Francisco Bay Area Planning and Urban Research Association, the Outdoor Arts Club of Mill Valley, the Marin Art and Garden Center, and the Women's League of San Francisco. She also served as secretary for the Mill Valley Parks and Recreation Commission.

French died in 1994. The archives of the Prentiss' lie in the collection of the College of Environmental Design at the University of California, Berkeley.

== See also ==
- List of California women architects
