= Frank M. Rines =

American painter

Frank March Rines (1892–1962) was an American landscape painter and instructor born in Dover, New Hampshire on June 3, 1892.

Rines attended the Eric Pape Art School from 1911 until graduation in 1914. Rines then attended the Fenway School of Illustration for one year and the Massachusetts Normal Art School (Massachusetts School of Art) from 1915-1918.

Frank M. Rines moved to Boston in 1922 and began his teaching career at the Massachusetts School of Art as an instructor in pencil technique and elementary drawing. Rines continued to teach there until 1941 and also taught at the Cambridge School of Architecture and Landscape Architecture, Massachusetts University, Boston University and the Boston Center for Adult Education. Rines worked primarily with graphite and watercolor during his early years which continued through the late 1920s.

Rines spent his summers in Rockport, Massachusetts from 1928 to 1941 where he taught and painted privately alongside other well-known artists such as Aldro Hibbard. In 1932 Rines became a member of the Rockport Art Association. In 1935, Rines became a founding member of the Rockport Art Galleries along with other well-known independent gallery owners, including William Lester Stevens, Joseph Eliot Enneking, Arthur J. Hammond, Marian Parkhust Sloane and Otis Pierce Cook, Jr. It was during this period that Rines began working primarily in oils and pastels.

Rines authored and published five instructional drawing books, with his first, Drawing in Lead Pencil, initially published 1929.

Rines was a member of many American art organizations, including the Rockport Art Association, the North Shore Art Association, the Washington Watercolor Club, the Marblehead Art Association and the Copley Society of Art, of which he became the Director.

His works are in many museums, including the Fogg Art Museum, the Boston Museum of Fine Arts, the Hood Museum of Art and the Library of Congress.
