= Henry Atherton Frost =

American architect and instructor

Henry Atherton Frost A.I.A.
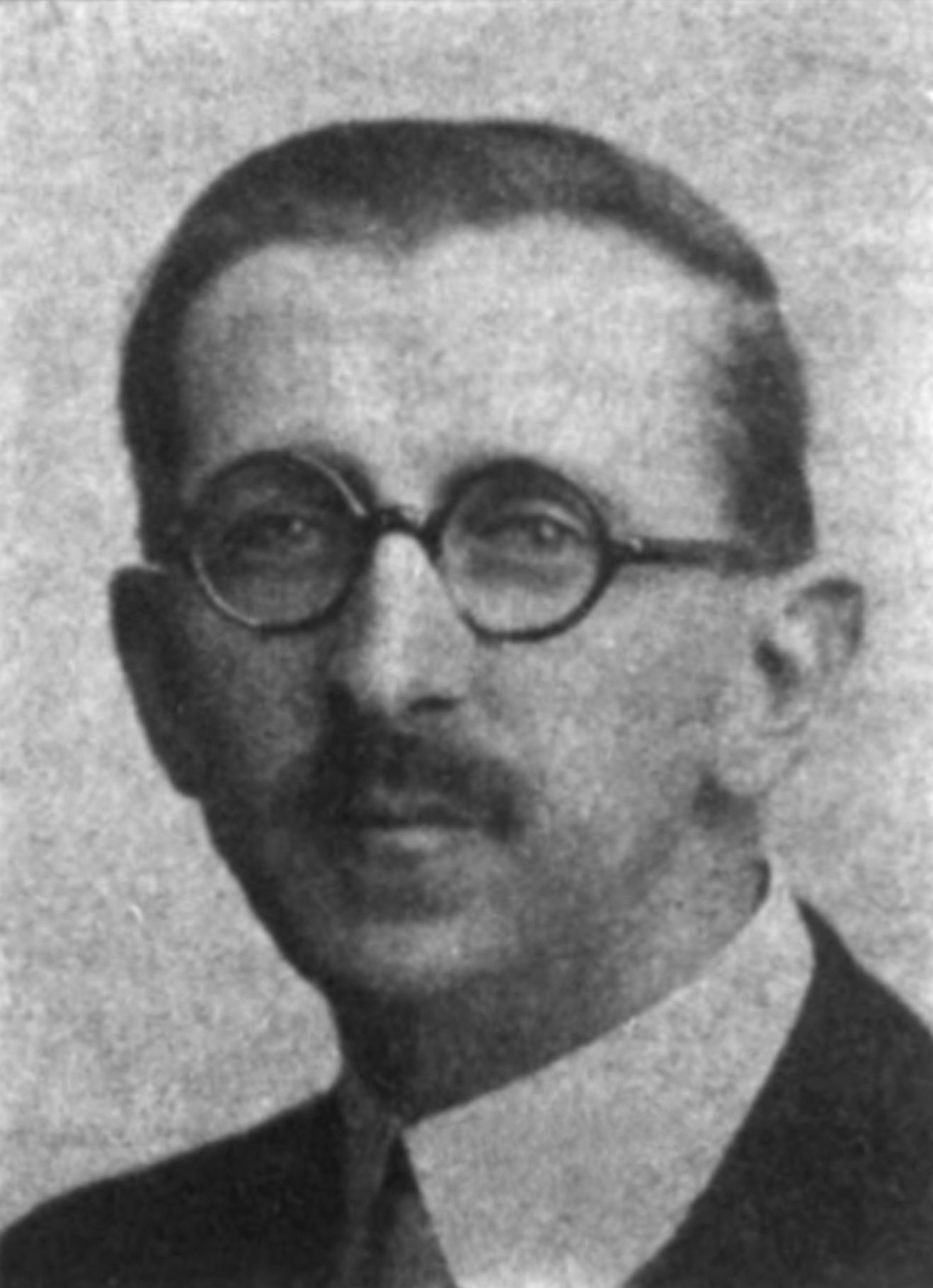
- Henry Atherton Frost (1927)
- Born: February 8, 1882; Newton Centre, Massachusetts
- Died: May 26, 1952 (aged 70); Athens, Ohio
- Burial place: Mount Auburn Cemetery
- Education: Harvard University
- Occupations: Architect, professor
- Known for: Founding of the Cambridge School of Architecture and Landscape Architecture
- Spouse: Anna Partenheimer Lochman (m. 1911)

Henry Atherton Frost, A.I.A. (February 8, 1883 – May 26, 1952) was an American architect and instructor at Harvard University. He was largely responsible for inaugurating and overseeing an early graduate program in architecture and landscape architecture for women that became known as the Cambridge School of Architecture and Landscape Architecture.

== Early life ==
Henry Atherton Frost was born in Newton Centre, Massachusetts, on February 8, 1882, to William Atherton and Myra Ames (Tilton) Frost. Frost attended Fitchburg High School and received his bachelor's degree from Harvard College in 1905 and master in architecture at Harvard University in 1910. Frost married Anna Partenheimer Lochman in 1911.

Frost was a member of the firm Frost and Raymond of Boston and president of Nichols and Frost of Fitchburg. He went on to the Harvard Graduate School of Design.

His great-great grandmother Eunice Atherton (1771–1839) was a direct descendant of James Atherton, one of the founders of Lancaster, Massachusetts. His son, Henry Atherton Frost Jr., would become an architectural designer in the Boston area.

== Career ==
Frost helped to inaugurate one of the earliest combined programs in architecture and landscape architecture for women. The Cambridge School of Architecture and Landscape Architecture developed as a result of the fact that in 1915 a recent graduate of Radcliffe College, Katherine Brooks, who intended to study landscape architecture at the Lowthorpe School of Landscape Architecture, wanted to begin by taking architectural drafting at Harvard but was refused entry because the school did not admit women.

Brooks consulted with the head of Harvard's school of landscape architecture, James Sturgis Pray, who then arranged for Frost, then a young instructor in architecture, to tutor Brooks privately. Somewhat to his surprise, Frost found his unexpected pupil an apt and enthusiastic student, and in an account of the school's founding he wrote: "Teaching a woman what we had always considered strictly a man's job was not the painful ordeal it had promised to be."

Within a year, Frost had four women students and another professor, the landscape architect Bremer Whidden Pond, had come on board. Even though the women followed the same curriculum as their male peers, Harvard students tended to dismiss the school with belittling terms such as the "Little School" and the "Frost and Pond Day Nursery". Word about the informal program spread, and by the 1916–17 academic year, the college was advertising the experimental program and its curriculum as the Cambridge School of Architectural and Landscape Design for Women. The first two women to complete the school's three-year program were Brooks and landscape architect Rose Greely; a later graduate was Eleanor Raymond.

In 1919, the school's name was changed to the Cambridge School of Domestic and Landscape Architecture for Women, a shift that Frost later regretted for its implication that women were only suited to residential (i.e. domestic) architectural design. A problem in the school's early years had been its inability to issue formal degrees, which are required in most states in order to register as a licensed architect. In the 1930s, after Harvard refused to become a formal degree-granting partner for the school, it moved its affiliation to Smith College.

Apart from teaching, Frost had his own solo architectural practice specializing in private residences, with an office in Harvard Square. Shortly after her graduation from the Cambridge School, Eleanor Raymond joined Frost as his partner (she had previously been working for him as a draftsperson while a student at the school). In 1920, the team won a $1000 prize in a competition to design a plan for the University of Buffalo's new undergraduate college. Around the same time, Frost brought Bremer Pond into the partnership.

After retirement from Harvard in 1940, Frost went to Ohio University where he became visiting professor in 1950.

Frost died at Sheltering Arms Hospital on May 26, 1952, in Athens, Ohio, due to injuries he suffered from an automobile crash. Police say he either suffered a heart attack or fell asleep driving which sent his car into a ditch. His wife, Anna, suffered facial injuries and a fractured shoulder. He is buried in Mount Auburn Cemetery.

Frost was a member of the American Institute of Architects and the Boston Society of Architects.
