= Rose Greely =

American landscape architect

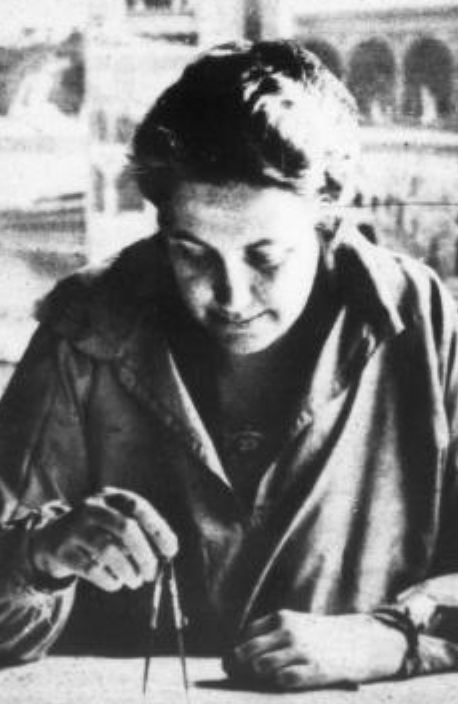
- Rose Greely, from a 1924 publication
- Born: 1887; Washington, D.C.
- Died: 1969 (aged 82)
- Occupation: Architect

Rose Ishbel Greely (1887 – May 23, 1969) was an American landscape architect and the first female licensed architect in Washington, D.C.

== Early life and education ==
Rose Isabel Greely was born in Washington, D.C., in 1887. She was the daughter of Arctic explorer, Adolphus Greely and Henrietta H.C. Nesmith.

Greely studied fine art at a number of different organizations, including Maryland Agricultural College, the Art Institute of Chicago, where she studied interior design, and metal work while in Washington. In Florence, Italy, she studied silver repoussé and metal enameling before deciding to study landscape architecture. She returned to the United States to attend Smith College, studying under Henry Atherton Frost and graduating around 1920 and trained as both architect and landscape architect at the Cambridge School of Domestic and Landscape Architecture for Women, graduating in 1919. Among her fellow students was Gertrude Sawyer, with whom she would later work on an estate that is now the Jefferson Patterson Park & Museum. After graduation, she worked for Fletcher Steele as a drafter in Boston.

== Career ==
She opened her own architectural firm in 1925 during the Country Place Area (1890-1940), becoming the first female licensed architect in Washington. The period she opened was a booming time for landscape architects with work from country estates with much planning and construction to create outbuildings and large gardens, commissioned by the new rich after World War I. The firm employed a secretary, an assistant, and two drafters and was located in an office in downtown Washington and worked in mostly Virginia, Washington, and Maryland. She designed more than 500 landscapes in her forty-year career, specializing in residential design but emphasized the integral relationship between buildings and their surroundings.

Greely worked on the staff of House Beautiful and in 1932, wrote the series "Why Should the Garden Have Design?" The series detailed her design philosophy, about Beaux-Art, Arts and Crafts, harmony, regional styles, native plant material and craft details. She felt that planting should echo the character of the architecture and that the landscape should emphasize the dominant points of the house and accentuate the beauty of an architectural element. Greely's designs for small city gardens were enclosed spaces, scaled with the house which made connections with the indoor space. Country estates were designed through a set of "rooms" emphasizing the landscape's vastness to create a parklike experience. Her suburban designs frequently featured a step-down entrance on the sidewalk, and a smaller set of "rooms" for differing activities. When working with clients, she prioritized their desires first, followed by the house (if built), and lastly by the existing landscape. Clients included members of the Garden Club of America, prominent figures in Washington including Senator Henry Cabot Lodge, Chester Bowles, Jefferson Patterson, and institutions.

One of her largest project, Aberdeen Proving Grounds, came in 1934 for the Army. The project received $2 million from Congress and Greely designed roads, gradings and plantings to complement the new buildings and houses. In 1936, she became a fellow and the only woman on the advisory board of the American Society of Landscape Architects’ advisory committee for the Colonial Williamsburg restoration project. In the 1940s and 1950s, she worked on military landscapes, schools, real estate developments, government housing, outdoor theaters, playgrounds, gardens, roads, country estates, expanding her work throughout the United States and Mexico.

Greely retired in 1956 due to arthritis but continued to consult on projects until the early 1960s. She died on May 23, 1969 at her home in Georgetown.

== Notable works ==
- Aberdeen Proving Grounds landscape, 1934-35
- Army & Navy Country Club Grounds, Arlington, 1941
- Brazilian Embassy landscape, 1929-31
- Friends Meeting House, 2111 Florida Avenue, NW, 1930
- John Russell Pope House, Woodland Drive NW, Massachusetts. 1942
- Los Poblanos Historic Inn & Organic Farm, Albuquerque, NM, 1932
- Paul S Putski house, Garfield Street NW, 1938
- Mr. and Mrs. William H. Taylor House, 28th and Q Sts, Washington, DC, 1936-37
- Mr. and Mrs. Morris Cafritz House, Washington, D.C., 1937-38
- Volta Place, Georgetown. Owned by Frances A. Sortwell and collaborated with Horace Peaslee, 1930.

== Writing ==
- "Planting Around the City House", House Beautiful, 1922
- "An Architect's Garden in the City." House Beautiful, November 1926, 557.
- "Some of the Factors, Both Practical and Aesthetic, That Influenced the Design of the Grounds," House Beautiful, 1932
- "Designing the Garden in Harmony with the House," House Beautiful, 1932
- "Balance and Rhythm of Landscape Design," House Beautiful, 1932
- "A Child's own Garden." House Beautiful, 1932

== Gallery ==
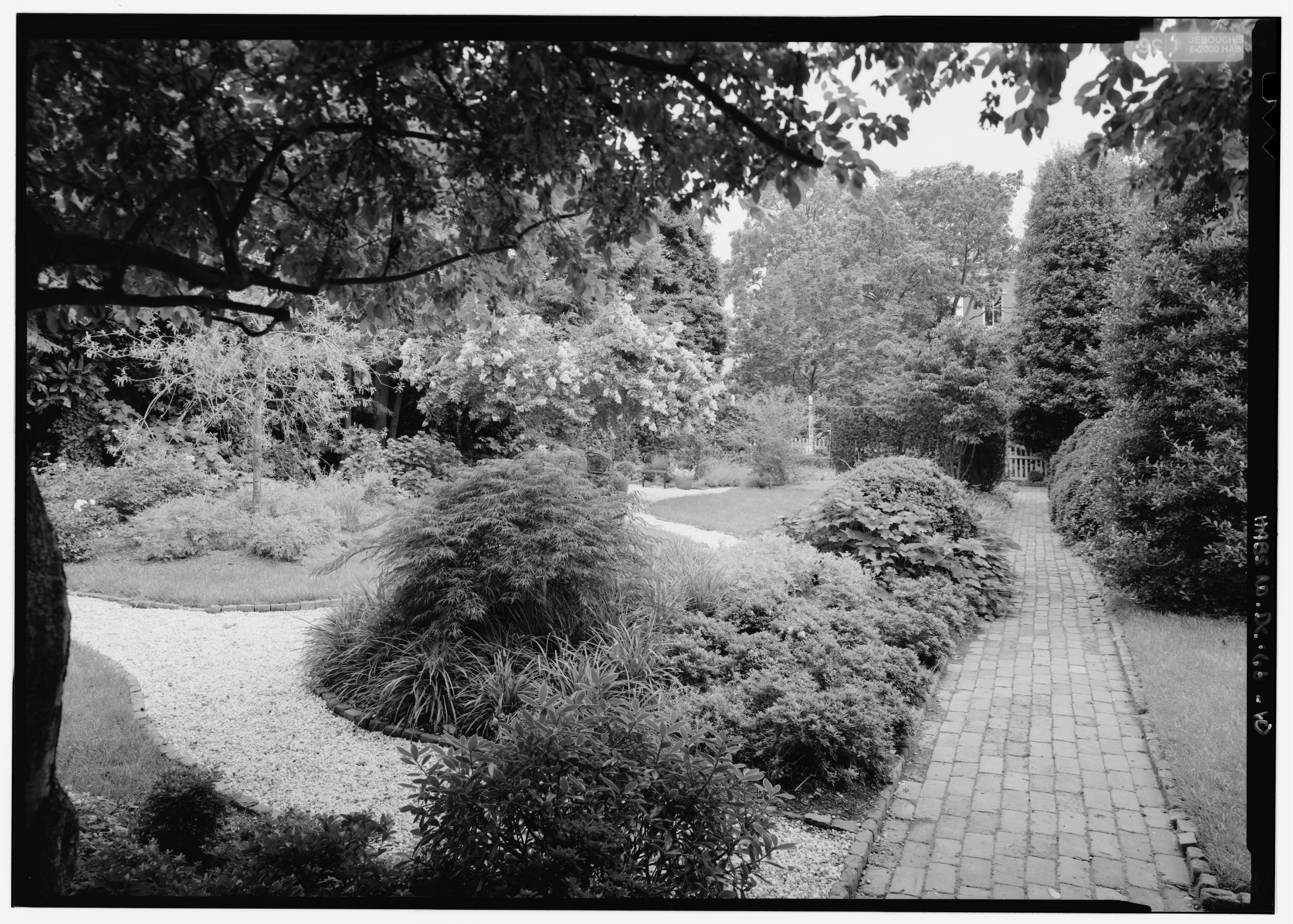
Garden view of the Henry Foxhall House, Washington, DC 1999

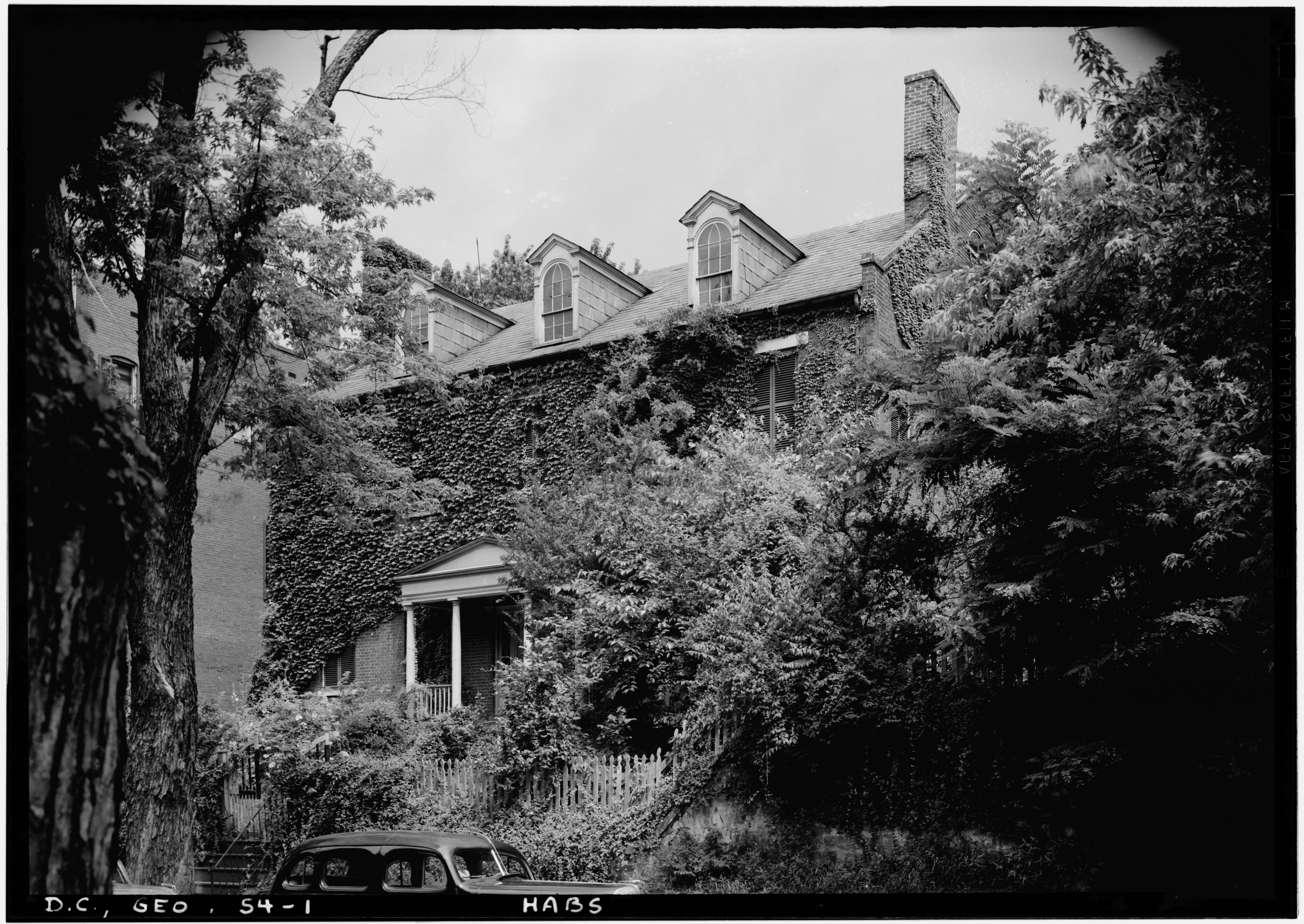
View from the Southeast of the Henry Foxhall House, Washington, DC 1942

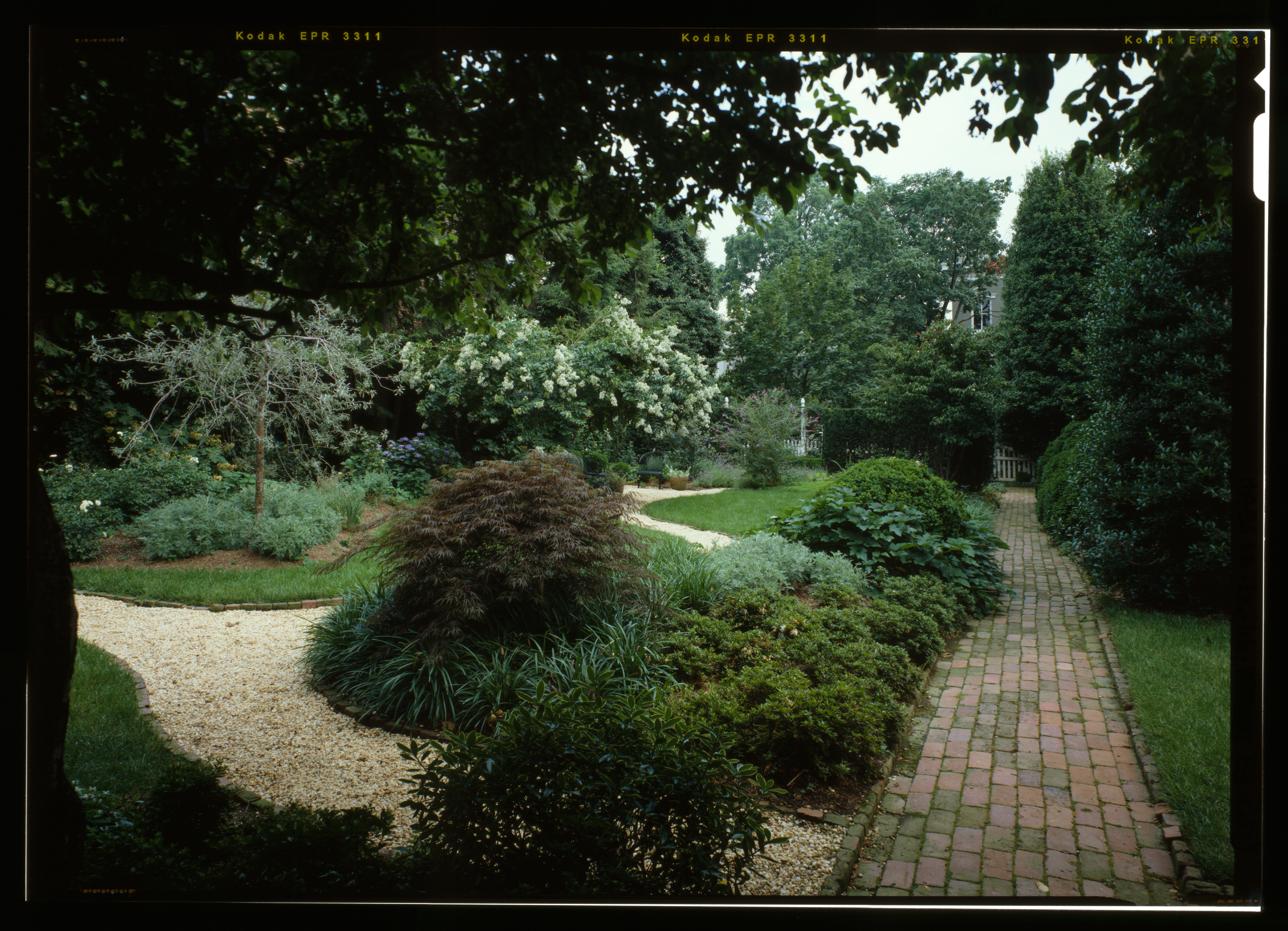
Garden view of the Henry Foxhall House, Washington, DC 1999

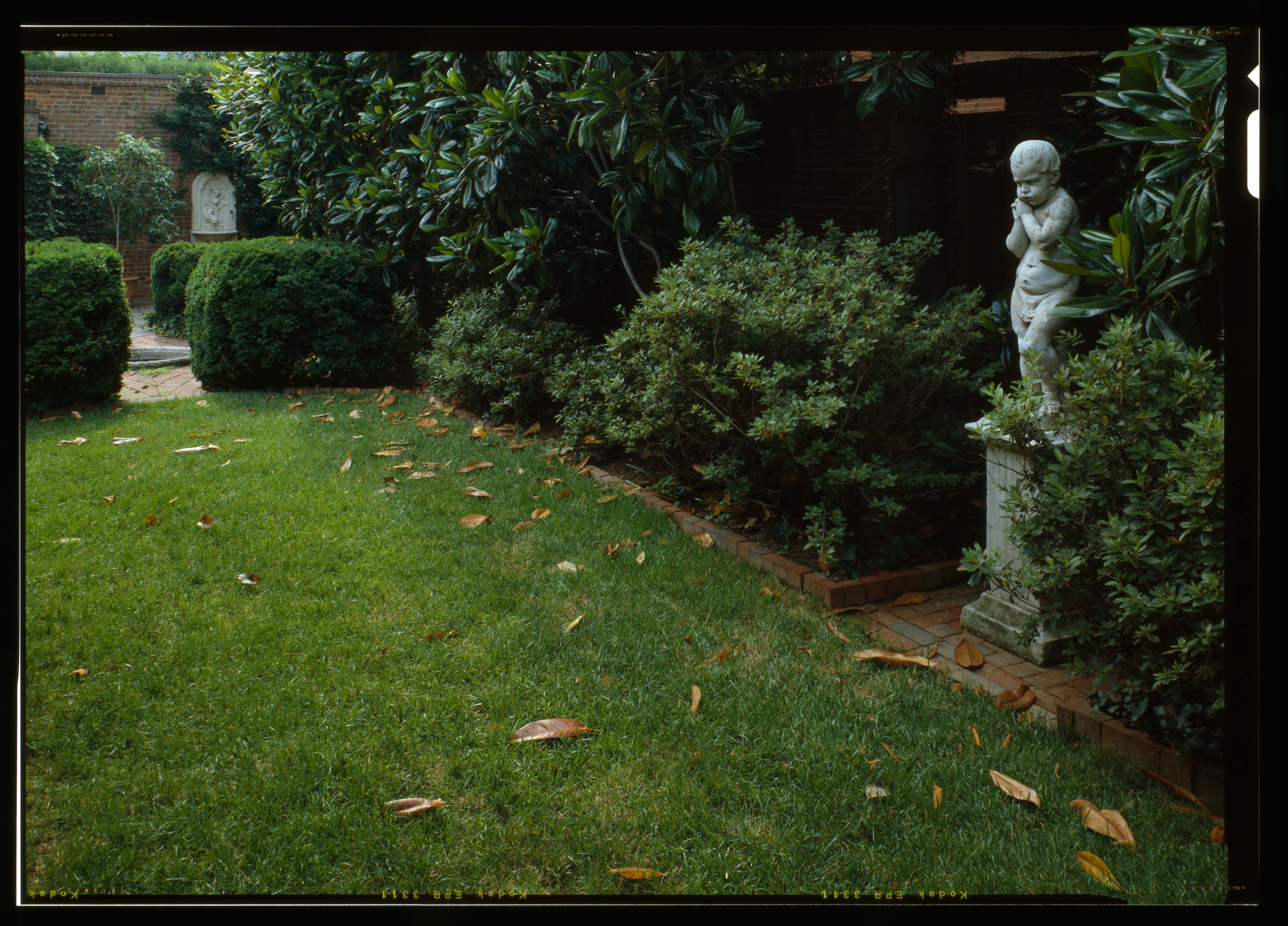
Garden view, looking cherub statue in the bowling alley of the Henry Foxhall House, Washington, DC 1999
