= Bremer Whidden Pond =

American landscape architect

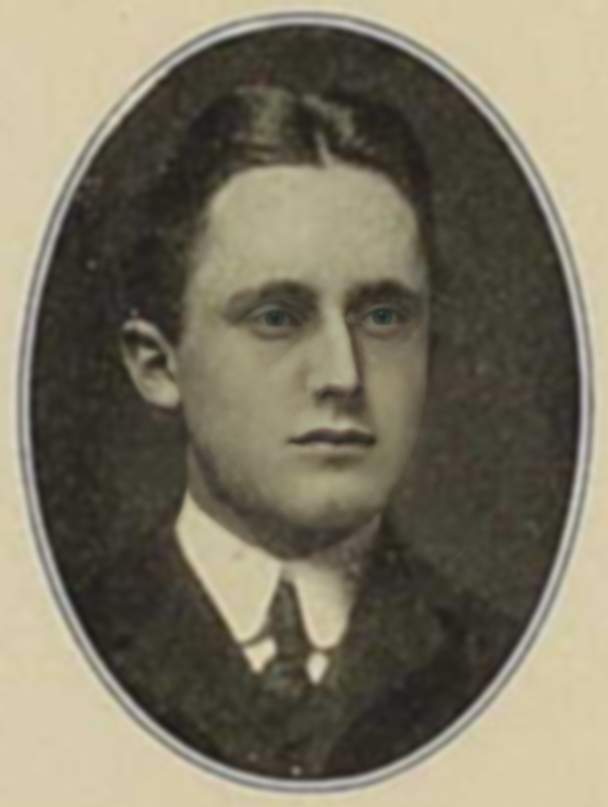
- Bremer Pond 1907
- Born: June 23, 1884; Boston, Massachusetts
- Died: September 2, 1959 (aged 75); Hanover, New Hampshire
- Education: Dartmouth College, B.A. (1906); Harvard University, M.L.A. (1906)
- Occupation: Landscape architect
- Years active: 1906–1936

Bremer Whidden Pond (June 23, 1884 – September 2, 1959) was an American landscape architect and professor at Harvard University. He was deeply involved with two early graduate programs in landscape architecture for women: the Cambridge School of Architecture and Landscape Architecture and the Lowthorpe School of Landscape Architecture.

== Early life ==
Bremer Whidden Pond was born in Boston, Massachusetts, on June 23, 1884, and got his bachelor's degree from Dartmouth College in 1906. He received his master's degree in landscape architecture from Harvard that same year. He went on to serve as secretary to the famous landscape architect Frederick Law Olmsted.

== Career ==
Bremer joined Harvard's School of Landscape Architecture in 1914 and remained at Harvard until his retirement in 1950. He eventually became the Charles Eliot Professor of Landscape Architecture and the chairman of the Department of Landscape Architecture in what became the Harvard Graduate School of Design.

In 1915, Harvard architecture instructor Henry Atherton Frost inaugurated an informal program of tutoring women in architecture since they could not be admitted to Harvard's male-only graduate program. Within a year, Frost had four women students and had brought Pond on board. Word about the informal program spread, and by the 1916–17 academic year, the college was advertising the experimental program and its curriculum as the Cambridge School of Architectural and Landscape Design (later to be renamed the Cambridge School of Architecture and Landscape Architecture). Among the women to complete the school's three-year program were landscape architects Rose Greely and Alice Recknagel Ireys.

Pond also served for a time as director of the Lowthorpe School of Landscape Architecture, another institution formed to give women access to higher education in landscape architecture.

In 1915, Pond opened his own office in Boston, and a few years later he went into partnership with Frost.

Pond was secretary of the American Society of Landscape Architects from 1922 to 1936. He also served as secretary of the Cambridge Historical Society, was a director of the Massachusetts Forest and Park Association, and helped to organize the Hubbard Educational Trust. He was a coeditor of The Transactions of the American Society of Landscape Architects, 1909-1921, and he edited Eleanor von Erdberg's 1936 book Chinese Influence on European Garden Structures.

Pond died on September 2, 1959, in Hanover, New Hampshire.

== Publications ==
- Outline History of Landscape Architecture (fine Arts 1f.). School of Landscape Architecture, Harvard University, 1933.
