= Wallace Brett Donham =

Donham, c. 1941

Wallace Brett Donham (October 26, 1877 in Rockland, Massachusetts– November 29, 1954) was an American organizational theorist, professor of business administration and the second dean of the Harvard Business School, from 1919 to 1942. The use of case studies in the HBS education curriculum was greatly expanded during Donham's time as dean.

Donham graduated from Harvard College in 1899 and then from Harvard Law School. Before becoming Dean, Donham was vice-president of the Old Colony Trust Company in Boston, from 1906 until 1919. He set out his business philosophy in two books, Business Adrift (with Alfred North Whitehead) (1931) and Business Looks at the Unforeseen (1932)." Donham was a conservative intellectual who was alarmed by the growing power of labor and by the growing regulatory state. In his writing as well as in his fostering of Elton Mayo, he hoped to protect and augment the power of corporate leaders and managers verses the state and labor.

== Archives and records ==
- Wallace Brett Donham papers at Baker Library Special Collections, Harvard Business School.
- Wallace Brett Donham cases and teaching files at Baker Library Special Collections, Harvard Business School.
