= James Sturgis Pray =

American educator (1871-1929)

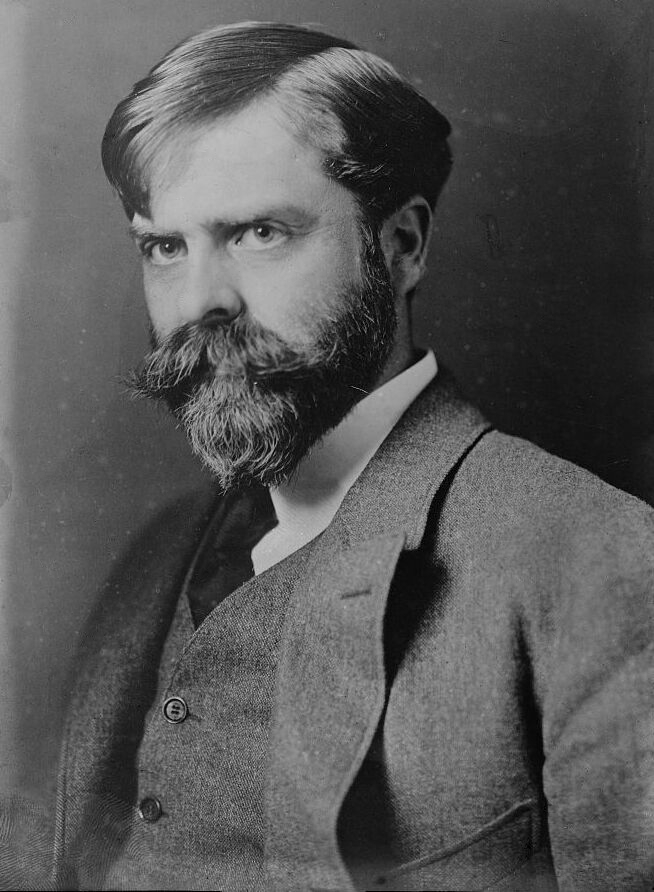
- Pray, circa 1915
- Born: February 26, 1871; Boston, Massachusetts, United States
- Died: February 24, 1929 (aged 57); Cambridge, Massachusetts, United States
- Education: Harvard University
- Occupation: Educator
- Spouse: Florence Mabel Nichols (m. 1901)
- Children: Benjamin Sturgis (b. 1904); Frances Motley (b. 1906)
- Parent(s): Benjamin Sweetser Pray; Frances Motley Gavett

James Sturgis Pray (February 26, 1871 – February 24, 1929) was an American educator. Pray was president of the American Society of Landscape Architects from 1914 to 1918 and held the post of chairman of the Department of Landscape Architecture at Harvard University.

== Biography ==
Pray graduated from the Chauncy Hall School in 1894 and Harvard College in 1898. Immediately following and until 1903, he worked for the Olmsted Brothers in Brookline. He married Florence Mabel Nichols on October 30, 1901 in Buffalo, and later had a son named Benjamin Sturgis, who also graduated from Harvard in 1925 and lived in Thayer Hall during his freshman year, and a daughter, Frances Motley, named after his mother. From 1904 until 1918, Pray worked for his own firms: Pray & Gallagher (1904-1906) and Pray, Hubbard, & White (1906-1918).

In 1908, Pray succeeded Frederick Law Olmsted as chairman of the Department of Landscape Architecture at Harvard University (1908-1928). Pray served as Assistant Professor of Landscape Architecture from 1905 to 1914, Charles Eliot Professor of Landscape Architecture from 1914 until his death.

Pray was a patron of the Lowthorpe School of Landscape Architecture in Groton.
