= Noanet Woodlands =

Open space tract in Massachusetts

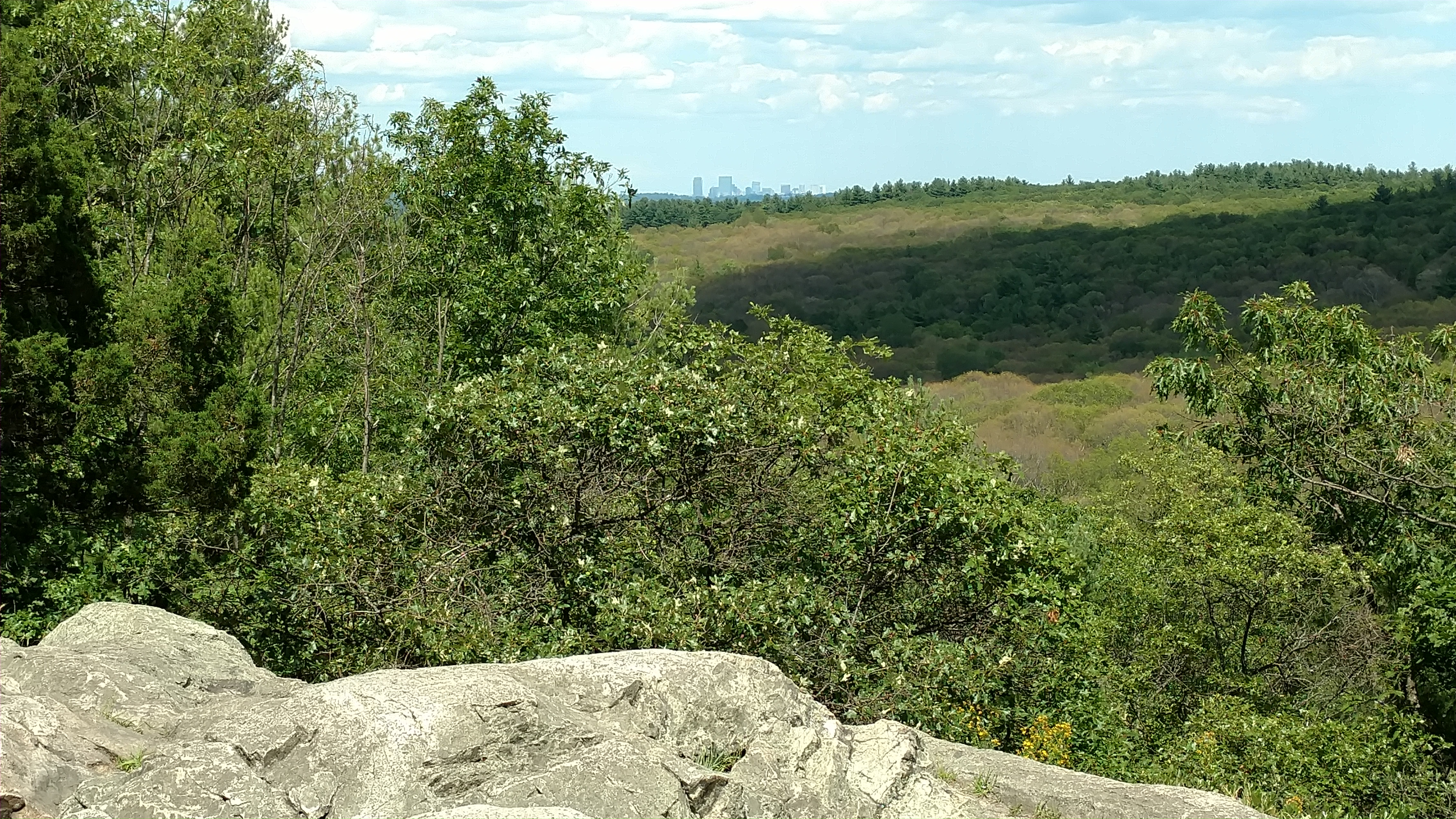
- View towards Boston from Noanet Peak
- Interactive map of Noanet Woodlands
- Type: Woodland
- Location: Powissett Street; Dover, Massachusetts, USA
- Coordinates: 42°14′49″N 71°16′8″W
- Area: 595 acres (241 ha)
- Established: 1984
- Operator: The Trustees of Reservations
- Hiking trails: 17 miles (27 km)
- Website: Noanet Woodlands

Noanet Woodlands is a 595-acre (241 ha) open space preserve located in Dover, Massachusetts. It is managed by the land conservation non-profit organization The Trustees of Reservations. The property has 17 miles (27 km) of hiking trails, several of which lead to the 387-foot summit of Noanet Peak, which offers a view of downtown Boston skyscrapers. The property's trail system connects to trails on two adjacent open space parcels: Powisset Farm (which is also owned by the Trustees), and Hale Education. Parking areas are at 93 Powisset Street and in Caryl Park, which is owned by the Town of Dover.

More than 120 species of birds have been identified at the property. The Noanet Peak Trail, the Peabody Loop, and the Caryl Loop Trail are described in the Appalachian Mountain Club's Massachusetts Trail Guide. Boston Magazine has included Noanet Woodlands on its list of "10 best fall hikes in New England."

Noanet Woodlands welcomes equestrians to ride on its bridle paths and jumps. Bike riding is permitted. On-leash dogs are permitted on the property. From October through December, bow hunting for deer is allowed on Monday through Saturday by permit.

== History ==
Noanet Woodlands is believed to have been named after a chief of the Natick Indians, a tribe of the Nipmuck. Members of the tribe used the land for hunting and fishing.

The Benjamin Caryl House, built in 1777 and listed on the National Register of Historic Places, is in the adjacent Caryl Park.

In the early 19th century, local farmer Samuel Fisher built a sawmill on Noanet Creek.

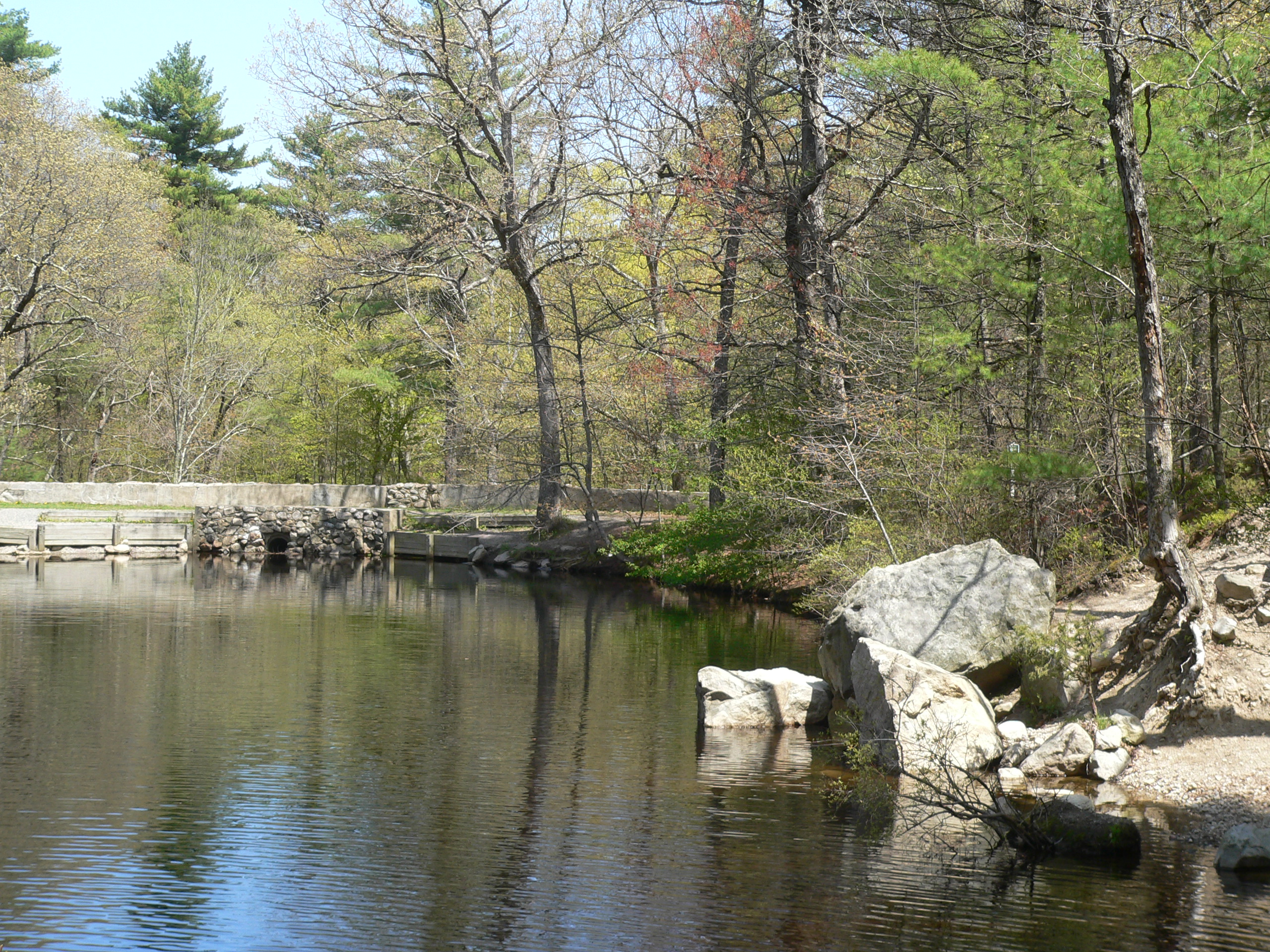
The Upper Mill Pond

Three ponds presently on the site were originally created by dams built on Noanet Brook by the Dover Union Iron Company, which operated a mill in the early 19th century. The dams were destroyed by floods in 1876, but were rebuilt in 1954 by Amelia Peabody. Peabody hired archaeologist Roland W. Robbins to investigate the mill site and advise on the reconstruction work.

Peabody had purchased the land in 1923; her estate encompassed a total of 800 acres. She established bridle paths and jumps on the land, and opened them to use by members of the Norfolk Hunt Club.

Peabody lived in a house built in 1750 on a 40-acre section of her property called Mill Farm. On the farm, she raised horses, white-faced Herefords, and Yorkshire pigs. At her death in 1984, her will bequeathed most of the land now comprising Noanet Woodlands to the Trustees. Mill Farm remains in private ownership. Additional land gifts in the 1970s and 1990s added to the Trustees property.
