= Eleanor Raymond =

American architect

Eleanor Raymond FAIA
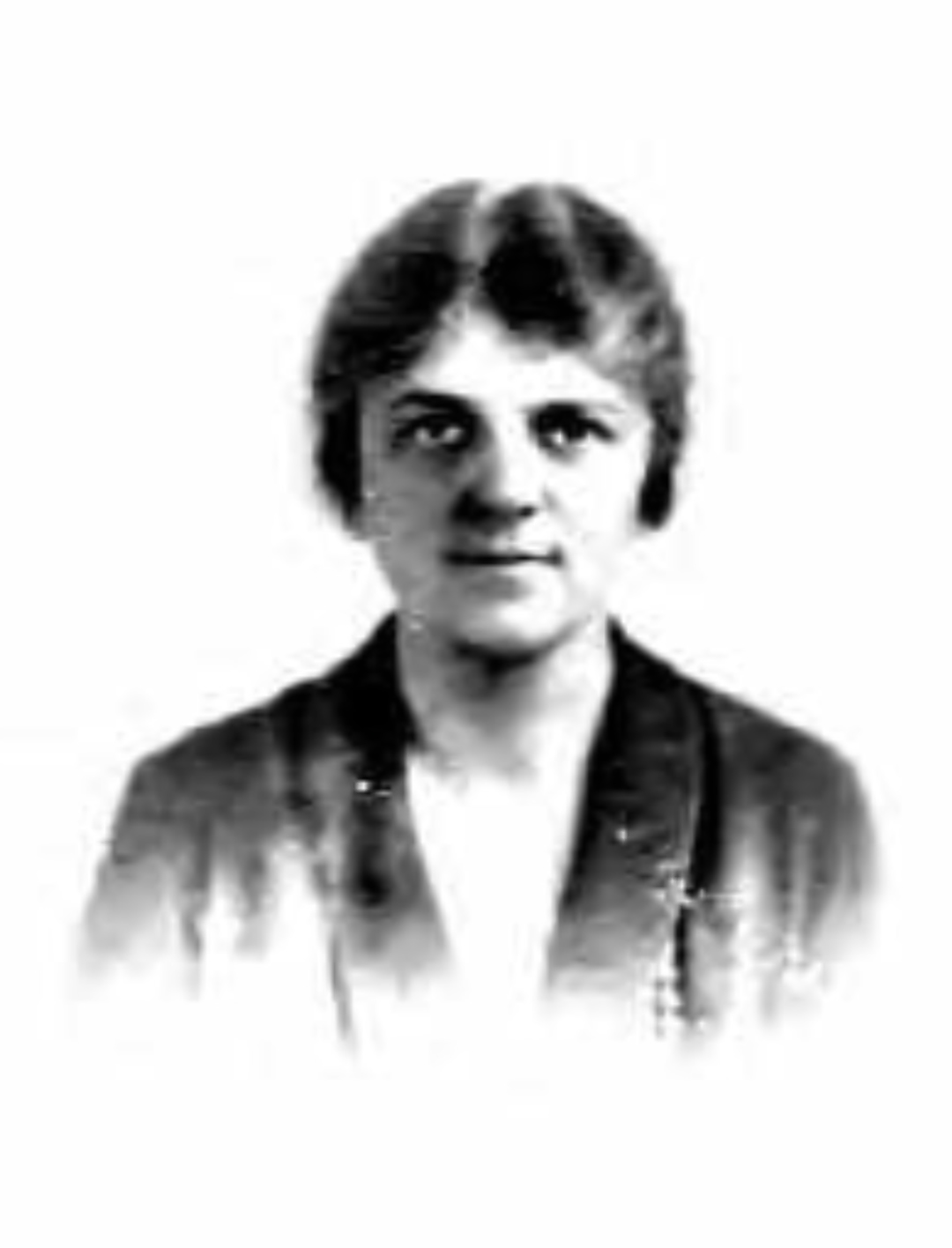
- Raymond in 1924
- Born: Eleanor Agnes Raymond; March 4, 1887; Cambridge, Massachusetts, US
- Died: July 24, 1989 (aged 102); Boston, Massachusetts, US
- Education: Wellesley College (1909); Cambridge School of Architecture and Landscape Architecture (1919)
- Occupation: Architect
- Notable work: Dover Sun House; Pillsbury Summer House

Eleanor Agnes Raymond FAIA (March 4, 1887 – July 24, 1989) was an American architect and historian of architecture and design. During a professional career spanning some sixty years of practice, mainly in residential housing, Raymond explored the use of innovative materials and building systems. Much of her work was commissioned by women from her social group in Boston and Cambridge, Massachusetts. One client called her “an architect who combines a respect for tradition with a disrespect for its limitations”. The author of a monograph on her life praised her work for its "subtle simplicity without succumbing to architectural exhibitionism".

She designed one of the first International Style houses in the United States in 1931, a plywood house in 1940, and the “Sun House”, in 1948. Raymond undertook one of her most ambitious works, the Dover Sun House, an innovative house with solar collectors, with scientist and inventor Maria Telkes from the MIT Solar Laboratory.

Eleanor Raymond amassed more than 50 years of professional experience in the practice of architecture, and in 1961 was made a fellow of the American Institute of Architects.

== Early life and education ==
Raymond was born in 1887 in Cambridge, Massachusetts, and graduated with a bachelor's degree from Wellesley College in 1909. In 1927, Raymond traveled in Europe, visiting France, England, Germany, and Italy. She saw the places that had formed the backdrop of her college studies, the parks, villas, churches, towns, and cities that were to quicken her interest in gardens and buildings. Inspired by her Wellesley landscape course and her travels to Europe, she now wished to continue her study of landscape architecture.

After graduation, she enrolled in the Cambridge School of Architecture and Landscape Architecture, a school that was then closely affiliated with Harvard’s School of Architecture. She was among five women architectural design students of Henry Atherton Frost and Bremer Whidden Pond in 1915, the school's first year of operation. It was there that she developed her lifelong interest in the relationship between architecture and landscape architecture. She graduated from the school in 1919.

In 1919 she opened an office in partnership with Henry Atherton Frost, and in 1928 she started her own office in Boston, Massachusetts. These offices produced a domestic architecture that was noteworthy at that time, and is even more relevant to the concerns of architecture today.

== Personal life ==
Raymond took part in a number of social movements of her day, including the women's suffrage movement and the settlement house movement. It was through a suffragist organization that she met her life partner, Ethel B. Power, who went on to attend and graduate from the Cambridge School of Architecture and Landscape Architecture as well. Raymond and Power—who became a longtime editor for House Beautiful magazine—remained together for more than half a century, until Power's death in 1969.

Raymond renovated a townhouse at 112 Charles Street in Boston as a group home for herself, Power, and other women. It was planned for the needs of businesswomen who required some work space at home and who needed the residence to be as "self-running" as possible, which led to a reduction in the footprints of both dining room and kitchen.

== Architectural work ==
On graduating, Raymond joined Frost's practice as his sole partner (she had previously been working for him as a draftsperson while a student). Raymond opened her own office in 1928 after working with Frost for several years. She was drawn to the simple vernacular structures expressive of rural American life, avoiding the grand facades and the exclusively modern styles that were popular with her contemporaries. In 1931, after five years of work, Raymond published Early Domestic Architecture of Pennsylvania, in which she explored what she called the “unstudied directness in fitting form to function” of very early American architecture. The book was one of the first systematic inventories of vernacular American architecture, and defined Raymond’s career.

Raymond became increasingly known primarily for residential designs that took cues from early American architecture, as well as for her restoration and remodeling work, which approached modern-day adaptive reuse. Raymond always worked within the “three fields” of a house—the exterior, interior, and landscape—and maintained that the architect must always know how the client will use the house. Much of her work was commissioned by women from her social group in Boston and Cambridge. One client called her “an architect who combines a respect for tradition with a disrespect for its limitations”. Doris Cole, author of a monograph on her life, praised her work for its "subtle simplicity without succumbing to architectural exhibitionism".

In her fusion of European and American influences, some scholars see Raymond as attempting to create a kind of regional modernism. The Rachel Raymond House in Belmont, Massachusetts (built for her sister in 1931 and demolished in 2006), for example, fuses the stark International-Style rectilinear forms of the exterior with an interior rich in traditional built-in cupboards, decorative wood trim, and antique hardware. The Rachel Raymond House was a manifestation of a Northeastern regional modernism that predates by six years the Gropius House in Lincoln, Massachusetts, which is often singled out as the "first" manifestation of an American regional modernism.

With physical chemist Mária Telkes, Raymond designed the Dover Sun House in 1948 in Dover, Massachusetts. The Dover Sun House was an "all-solar house" and had a bank of glass plate heat collectors. It used Telkes' phase-change system to collect and store solar energy. The project was funded by philanthropist and sculptor Amelia Peabody, and built on her property in Dover, Massachusetts.

Raymond supervised Sarah Pillsbury Harkness, later a founder of The Architects Collaborative, when Harkness was a student at the Cambridge School of Architecture and Landscape Architecture. The project was the design of the Pillsbury Summer House in Duxbury, Massachusetts. The house, built in 1938, is still in use as a private home and was listed on the National Register of Historic Places in 2004.

Raymond was a member of the American Institute of Architects, and in 1961 was elected a Fellow of the American Institute of Architects.

In 1977 her work was exhibited in Women in American Architecture at the Brooklyn Museum.

== Death and legacy ==
Raymond died in Boston, Massachusetts, on July 4, 1989, at the age of 102.

A collection of Raymond's blueprints, papers, diaries, letters, and scrapbooks documenting some 200 of her buildings is held by the Harvard Graduate School of Design. A portfolio of materials about her architectural work is held by the Historic New England museum, and includes a number of articles written by Power about Raymond.

== Significant works ==
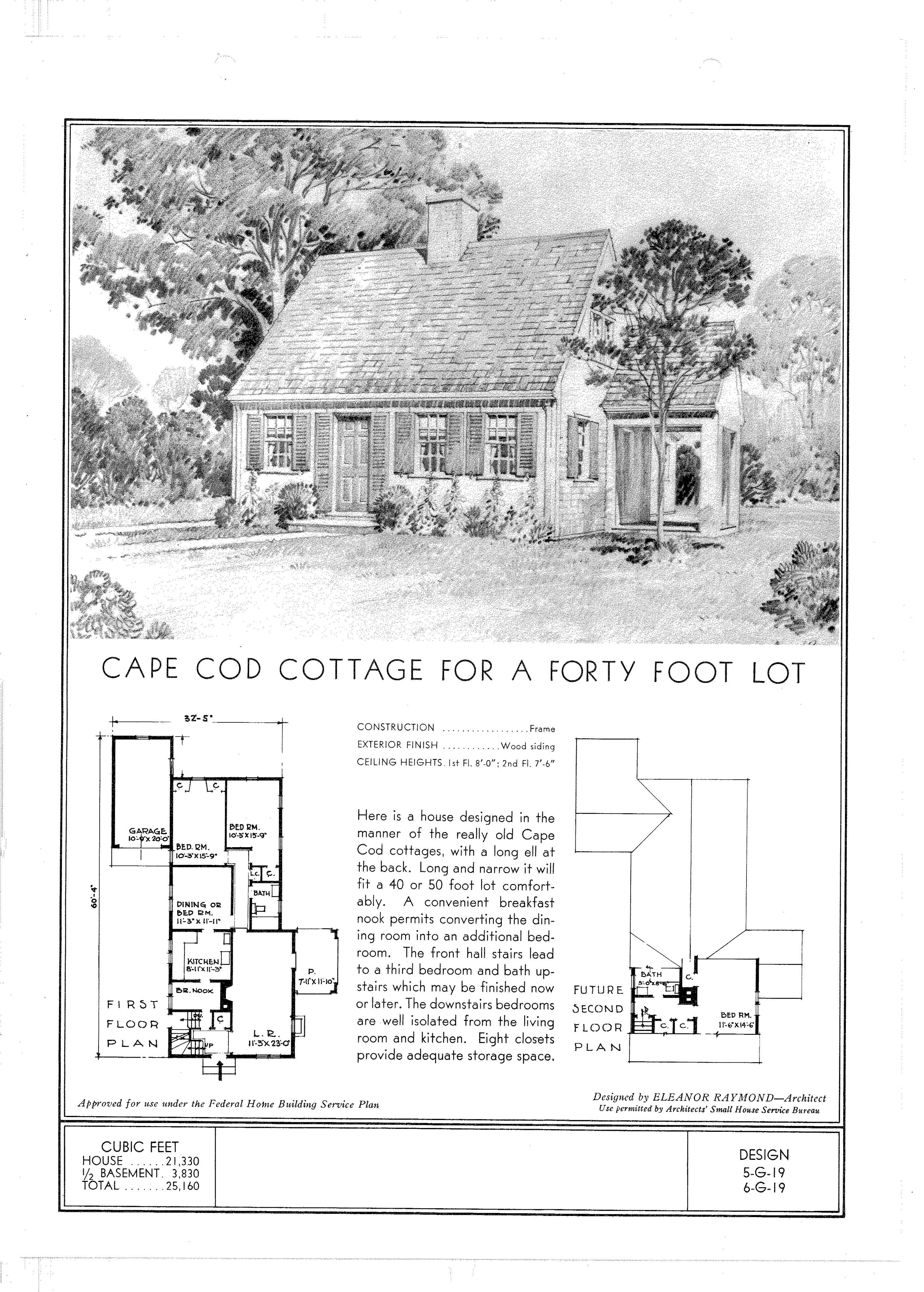
1940 federal-government plans for a three-quarter house Cape Cod House designed by Eleanor Raymond

- Cleaves House (1919)
- TZE House (1922)
- 112 Charles St. (c. 1923)
- Barnes House Renovation (1929)
- High Spruces House (1929)
- Rachel Raymond House (1931) (demolished)
- Peabody Farm Buildings (1934)
- Frost House (1935)
- Horace W. Frost House (1935)
- Sugarman House (1935)
- Elliott House (1935-1936)
- Miller House (1936)
- Glaser House, Cambridge, Massachusetts (1937)
- Pillsbury Summer House (1938)
- Farnsworth House (1939)
- Natalie Hays Hammond House, Gloucester, Massachusetts (c. 1940)
- Plywood House (1940)
- Peabody Plywood House (1940–1941) (demolished)
- Parker Plywood House (1941, 1945–1946)
- Hammond Compound (1941–1942)
- Peabody Sun-Heated House (1948)
- Dover Sun House (1948)
- Pope House (1949–1950)
- Meyer House (1958)
- Nichols Factory Addition (1959–1960)
- Damon House (1961)
- Baxter-Ward Antique Shop (1970)
- Peabody Westville Sporthaus (1972)
- Smith House (1973)

== Publications ==
- Eleanor Raymond. Early Domestic Architecture of Pennsylvania. 1931

== Recent Scholarship on Eleanor Raymond ==
- Sarah Allaback, ''The First American Women Architects.'' Urbana: University of Illinois Press, 2008. ISBN 9780252033216
- Murphy, Kevin D. "The vernacular moment: Eleanor Raymond, Walter Gropius, and New England Modernism between the Wars" in Journal of the Society of Architectural Historians, 2011 Sept., v.70, n.3, p. 308-329. DOI: 10.1525
- Hunting, Mary Anne and Kevin D. Murphy, Women Architects at Work: Making American Modernism. Princeton, NJ: Princeton University Press, 2025. ISBN 9780691206691
