= Charles River School =

Private school in Dover, Massachusetts, United States

Coordinates: 42°14′40.0″N 71°16′41.2″W

- Dover, Massachusetts; United States

Information
- Type: Private coeducational
- Established: 1911
- Headmaster: Gabe Burnstein
- Faculty: 36
- Grades: Pre K - 8
- Enrollment: 190
- Campus: Suburban
- Colors: Navy blue and gold
- Website: http://www.charlesriverschool.org
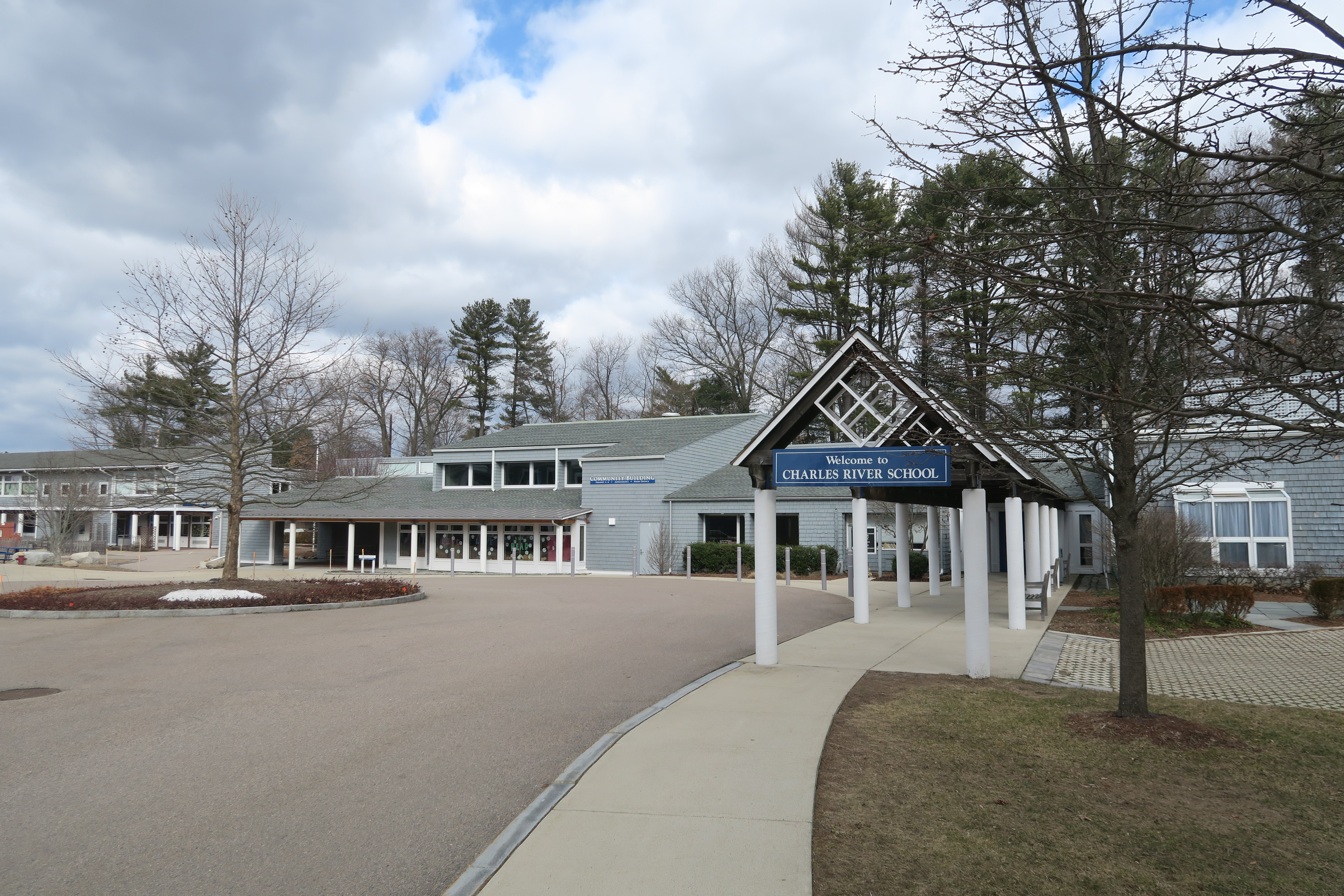

Charles River School was founded by parents on the banks of the Charles River in Needham, Massachusetts, United States, in 1911. In 1917, the school moved to Dover, Massachusetts. Today the school serves children from Pre-Kindergarten to Grade Eight. The school is accredited by the Association of Independent Schools in New England.

== CRS Summer Programs ==
The Charles River Creative Arts Program (CRCAP) was founded in 1970 to provide an environment in which young people could pursue an interest in the arts. As the school looks to expand its summer offerings, CRCAP has been dismantled.

In previous years, approximately 550 students from around the state, ages 8 to 15, enrolled in the program each year. CRCAP students chose their own schedule from more than 130 classes in art, writing, media, performing arts, gymnastics, textiles, sports, photography, and more. Every summer the program produced two original musical productions, which were usually written by CRCAP alumni or staff members.

Programs based on the CRCAP model have been established in 20 states, including six other programs in Massachusetts. CRCAP-inspired programs have also been initiated in Geneva, Switzerland, and Hong Kong. Guest artists to the program have included William Wegman, James Taylor, Madeleine l'Engle, Tracy Chapman, Mary Chapin Carpenter, Noel Stookey, William Hurt, Israel Horovitz, Jane Alexander, Yo Yo Ma, Elizabeth Swados, John Hockenberry, Julie Harris, Niia, and Matt and Kim.

Beginning in 2021, plans were underway for a broader summer experience at CRS.

== Notable alumni ==
- Sarah Parsons - Olympian 2006 - US Women's Hockey - youngest member of the United States women's national ice hockey team that competed in Turin, Italy. Won Bronze Medal
- Francis W. Sargent - former Governor of Massachusetts
- Rosemary Mahoney - author "Down the Nile in a Fisherman's Skiff"
