= Westwood, Massachusetts =

- Town
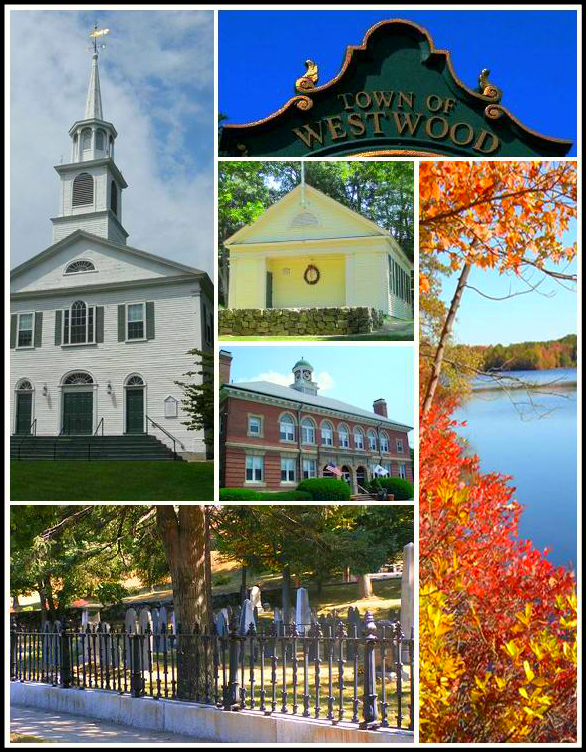
- From left to right: Westwood First Parish Church, inscription on town clock, Fisher School House, Hale Reservation, Town Hall, and the Old Burial Ground

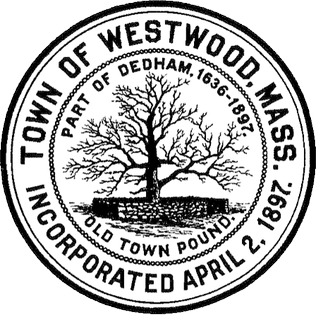
- Seal
- Motto: "Committed to service"
- Location in Norfolk County in Massachusetts
- Coordinates: 42°12′50″N 71°13′30″W
- Country: United States
- State: Massachusetts
- County: Norfolk
- Settled: 1641
- Incorporated: 1897

Government
  - Type: Open town meeting
  - Town Administrator: Connor Read

Area
  - Total: 11.1 sq mi (28.8 km^{2})
  - Land: 11.0 sq mi (28.4 km^{2})
  - Water: 0.15 sq mi (0.4 km^{2})
- Elevation: 220 ft (67 m)

Population (2020)
  - Total: 16,266
  - Density: 1,483/sq mi (572.7/km^{2})
- Time zone: UTC-5 (Eastern)
  - Summer (DST): UTC-4 (Eastern)
- ZIP code: 02090
- Area code: 339 / 781
- FIPS code: 25-78690
- GNIS feature ID: 0618333
- Website: www.townhall.westwood.ma.us

Westwood is a town in Norfolk County, Massachusetts, United States. The population was 16,266 at the 2020 United States census.

== History ==
Westwood was first settled in 1641 and was part of the town of Dedham, originally called 'West Dedham', until it was officially incorporated in 1897. It was the last town to split from the original town of Dedham. From early in the settlement of Dedham, the people of the Clapboard Trees Precinct were "a wealthy, sophisticated lot, familiar with the bigwigs of provincial politics and prone to the religious liberalism that was à la mode in Boston." Residents did not care for the politically more powerful Calvinist views of those who lived in the village of Dedham and asked to separate.

It was originally to have been named the "Town of Nahatan:"

a bill to incorporate the Town of Nahatan was reported in the Senate on March 8, 1897, by Senator Charles F. Woodward, Chairman of the Committee on Towns. No opposition to the passage of the bill appeared until it reached the House, when the representative from Nahant objected to the name "Nahatan," owing to its alleged similarity to the name Nahant. It was desirable for the old, as well as the new town, to have the question of incorporation settled, if possible, before April 5, when appropriations for the coming year were going to be made. Therefore, in order to remove every trace of friction, however trivial, and thus expedite matters, the name was changed to Westwood.

== Geography ==
According to the United States Census Bureau, the town has a total area of 11.1 square miles (29 km^{2}), of which 11.0 square miles (28 km^{2}) is land and 0.2 square miles (0.52 km^{2}) (1.35%) is water.

=== Adjacent towns ===
Westwood is located in eastern Massachusetts, bordered by:

- the town of Needham to the north
- the town of Dedham to the east
- the town of Canton to the southeast
- the town of Norwood to the south
- the town of Walpole to the southwest
- the town of Dover to the west

== Demographics ==
Historical population
Year	Pop.	±%
1900	1,112	—
1910	1,266	+13.8%
1920	1,358	+7.3%
1930	2,097	+54.4%
1940	3,376	+61.0%
1950	5,837	+72.9%
1960	10,354	+77.4%
1970	12,750	+23.1%
1980	13,212	+3.6%
1990	12,557	−5.0%
2000	14,117	+12.4%
2010	14,618	+3.5%
2020	16,266	+11.3%
2024*	16,533	+1.6%
* = population estimate. Source: United States Census records and Population Estimates Program data.

As of the census of 2020, there were 16,266 people and 5,424 households residing in the town with an average household size of 2.94. The population density was 1,478.7 inhabitants per square mile (570.9/km^{2}). The racial makeup of the town was 79.5% White, 2.9% African American, 0.0% Native American, 11.8% Asian, 0.0% from other races, and 4.5% from two or more races. Hispanic or Latino of any race were 3.4% of the population.

The population was spread out with 25.6% under the age of 18, 56.0% between the ages of 18 and 65, and 18.4% age 65 and over. Females were 51.6% of the population

The median household income was $171,071. The per capita income for the town was $75,396. About 2.3% of the population were below the poverty line.

== Government ==
The town of Westwood operates under a home rule charter. This means that the town is given a degree of autonomy in regards to internal affairs. The charter defines the powers of elected boards, including the select board, which serves as the executive branch of government and hires a Town Administrator responsible for day-to-day operations of town departments. The legislative branch operates through open town meeting, which meets at least once and often twice a year where all residents are entitled to speak and vote on approval of warrant articles which authorize the town budget and may create or modify town bylaws. Select Board members and other town officials are elected through an annual town election at the end of April. The select board appoints residents to various volunteer boards and committees. The Town Administrator appoints town staff who manage public safety, recreation, and other services. The Westwood Select Board has three members who serve overlapping three-year terms. Marianne C. LeBlanc Cummings, Joseph E. Previtera and Robert R. Gotti are currently Westwood's Select Board members. Cummings' term will be up in 2025, Previtera's in 2026, and Gotti's in 2027.

The town seal, designed by a descendant of Nathaniel Colburn, includes a drawing of the Town Pound. On May 14, 1700, Lt. Joseph Colburn (Note: Colburn lived from 1662 to 1718. He was the 11th and last child of Nathaniel Colburn. He was a town surveyor and set the boundary between Dedham and Medfield as well as between Dedham and Dorchester. He also laid out highways and cartways in town. Additionally, he was a constable and a tithingman. As such, he was responsible for maintaining moral family order.) was paid "forty shillings of the Town rate" for constructing an animal pound measuring 33' square on his land. (Note: In 1639, the land was originally granted to Rev. John Allin.) The pound was originally made out of wood and later reconstructed with stone. By including the tree, the new town was paying homage to Dedham, which includes the Avery Oak on its seal. The tree was toppled in the 1938 New England hurricane, but a new oak was planted in its place.

== Education ==
=== Public schools ===
Westwood currently has four public elementary schools:

- Downey
- Pine Hill (formerly Paul R. Hanlon and Deerfield)
- Martha Jones
- William E. Sheehan (originally Pond Plain)

Westwood has one public middle school, Thurston Middle School, named after Edmund W. Thurston. Westwood High School, the only public high school in Westwood, serves the Westwood area.

Westwood High School was rebuilt in 2005, and the old school, built in 1957, was demolished. The gymnasium and swimming facility from the old school were refurbished and are part of the new high school campus. The school facilities also include a multi-use artificial turf field (named after former Westwood High School principal and teacher Charles Flahive) with a synthetic track, both of which are open to the public.

=== Private schools ===
Westwood is home to Xaverian Brothers High School, an all-boys Catholic prep school and the Westwood Montessori School, a preschool.

== Points of interest ==
- Hale (formerly called Hale Reservation) – a private non-profit educational organization with 1,137 acres of land, including beaches and walking trails.
- Westwood Library – On April 7, 2010, Library Trustees hosted a groundbreaking ceremony for the town's new library. The new building was opened in Summer 2013.
- Colburn School – A school built in 1877 that is listed in the National Register of Historic Places.
- University Station – A recently built outdoor mall with restaurants, shops, and condos. University Station abuts Route 128 station, a rail station serving Amtrak and the MBTA commuter rail.
- Oven Mouth Cave - The mouth of a Tunnel leading to an Indian cave, which was active during the Colonial period of the Massachusetts Bay Colony.
- Buckmaster Pond

== Houses of worship ==
- First Baptist Church of Westwood, 808 High Street (Association: American Baptist)
- First Parish of Westwood United Church, 252 Nahatan Street (Association: United Church of Christ, Unitarian Universalist Association).
- Temple Beth David, 7 Clapboardtree Street (Association: Union for Reform Judaism)
- St. Denis Parish, 157 Washington Street (Association: Catholic Archdiocese of Boston)
- St. John's Episcopal Church, 95 Deerfield Avenue (Association: Episcopal Diocese of Eastern Massachusetts) stjohnswestwood.org
- St. Margaret Mary Parish, 845 High Street (Association: Catholic Archdiocese of Boston)

Westwood has an active Interfaith Council.

== Transportation ==
Route 128 station, located in the far eastern corner of Westwood, is served by MBTA Commuter Rail Providence/Stoughton Line service and Amtrak Acela and Northeast Regional service. Islington station is served by MBTA Franklin/Foxboro Line service. MBTA bus route 34E operates through Westwood on Washington Street.

== Trivia ==
- The remnants of Oven Mouth Cave sit along Route 109. The massive rock that once contained the cave was known as the "Oven's Mouth." It was blown up along with most of the cave in the 1950s to straighten out Route 109.
- Maj. Robert Steele, the Continental Army drummer boy during the Battle of Bunker Hill, is buried in the old Westwood Cemetery off Route 109.
- Westwood is home of the oldest animal pound in the United States.
- Westwood was a dry town until 2005. Restaurants can now apply for liquor licenses.

== Notable people ==
- Leo Beranek, acoustic engineer and co-founder of Internet pioneer, Bolt Beranek and Newman
- Mike Cafarella, computer scientist and co-founder of the Apache Hadoop big data project
- Bishop Christopher Coyne, served as parish priest of St. Margaret Mary Church
- Jon Finn, guitarist, rock musician
- Fern Flaman, former Boston Bruin and Toronto Maple Leaf. Stanley Cup winner, longtime hockey coach at Northeastern and Hockey Hall of Famer
- Kenny Florian, Mixed Martial Arts (MMA) fighter, FOX/UFC analyst
- John Harrington, former CEO of the Boston Red Sox
- Mike Hazen, Executive vice president and general manager of the Arizona Diamondbacks
- Paul LaCamera, United States Army four-star general and infantry officer
- Andrew Mackiewicz (born 1995), Olympic saber fencer
- Jackie MacMullan, newspaper sportswriter and NBA columnist for ESPN.com
- Drake Maye, American professional football quarterback for the New England Patriots
- Josh McDaniels, American Football coach
- Peter S. Pezzati, portrait painter
- Barry Reed, American trial lawyer and bestselling author
- Robert B. Rheault, American military officer and commander of all US Army Special Forces in Vietnam in 1969
- Milt Schmidt, former Boston Bruin and Hockey Hall of Famer
- Robert Steele, drummer boy for the Continental Army during the Battle of Bunker Hill of the Revolutionary War; buried in the Old Westwood Cemetery
- Mike Woicik, strength and conditioning coach for the Dallas Cowboys. Tied for second most Super Bowl rings with Bill Belichick (Only behind Tom Brady)
