= Amelia Peabody (philanthropist) =

American philanthropist, sculptor and breeder

- Amelia Peabody, ca. 1922
- Born: July 3, 1890; Marblehead, Massachusetts
- Died: May 30, 1984 (aged 93); Dover, Massachusetts
- Education: School of the Museum of Fine Arts
- Known for: Sculptor, Philanthropy

Amelia Peabody (July 3, 1890 – May 30,1984) was an American philanthropist, sculptor, and breeder. She was an heir to a founder of the investment firm Kidder, Peabody & Company.

Peabody studied sculpture at the School of the Museum of Fine Arts under Charles Grafly and Bela Pratt. Her sculpture can be found at the Museum of Fine Arts, Boston; the Boston Athenaeum; Children's Hospital, Boston; Northeastern University; Tufts Veterinary Medical Center; The Peabody & Essex Museum; Harvard University; Marblehead Historical Commission; The Dover Town Library and the Dover Historical Society.

At her farms, Powisset Farm and Mill Farm in Dover, Massachusetts, she raised registered Hereford cattle, Yorkshire pigs, sheep, and thoroughbred horses.

Beginning in 1944, she chaired the Arts and Skills division of the American Red Cross, which promoted art therapy for wounded servicemen during World War II.

At Powisset Farm in 1948, she financed the construction of one of the world's first solar-heated houses, the Dover Sun House. The house was designed by architect Eleanor Raymond and Dr. Maria Telkes of M.I.T .

Amelia Peabody died on May 30, 1984, at Mill Farm in Dover, Massachusetts of natural causes, leaving the bulk of her large estate to charity.Miss Peabody was probably the most important philanthropist of her era, helping to build or transform major institutions in Boston such as the Institute of Contemporary Art, the Museum of Science, the Joslin Diabetes Center, Tufts Veterinary Medical Center, Northeastern University, Beth Israel Deaconess Hospital, Massachusetts General Hospital, Children's Hospital and Harvard University.
