= Dover Sun House =

- Interactive map of the Dover Sun House area

General information
- Type: Familyhouse
- Architectural style: Experimental
- Location: Dover, Massachusetts
- Coordinates: 42.2268°N 71.2583°W
- Completed: 1948
- Demolished: 2010

Technical details
- Material: Wood and glass
- Floor count: 2
- Floor area: c. 1620 ft^{2}

Design and construction
- Architect: Eleanor Raymond
- Other designers: Heating system developed by physicist Mária Telkes.

Dover Sun House was one of the world's first solar-heated houses. It was designed by architect Eleanor Raymond and had a heating system developed by physicist Mária Telkes.

In 1948, Mária Telkes and architect Eleanor Raymond began working on the Dover Sun House. The project was funded by philanthropist and sculptor Amelia Peabody, and built on her property in Dover, Massachusetts.

The house was heated by a system designed so that Glauber's salt (a form of sodium sulfate) was allowed to melt in a solar-heated space. During the day, fans brought air through the warm space and via ducts out to the rooms of the house, at night air was brought through the same space where the salt then cooled and released its stored heat.

In its first two years, the house was successful, gaining huge publicity and attracting lots of visitors. Popular Science hailed it as perhaps more important, scientifically, than the atomic bomb.

The owners had to remove the system when, by the third winter, there were problems with the sodium sulfate, which had built up in layers of liquid and solid material, and its containers were corroded and leaking, and the continuous melting and cooling of the Glauber's salt prevented the substance from mixing properly.

In 1954, the solar heating system was replaced by a conventional system with heating oil. The Dover Sun House was demolished sometime after 2012 and replaced by a new house that includes a large solar array.

See PBS American Experience “The Sun Queen” 2023.
