= Pillsbury Summer House =

Historic house in Massachusetts, United States

- U.S. National Register of Historic Places
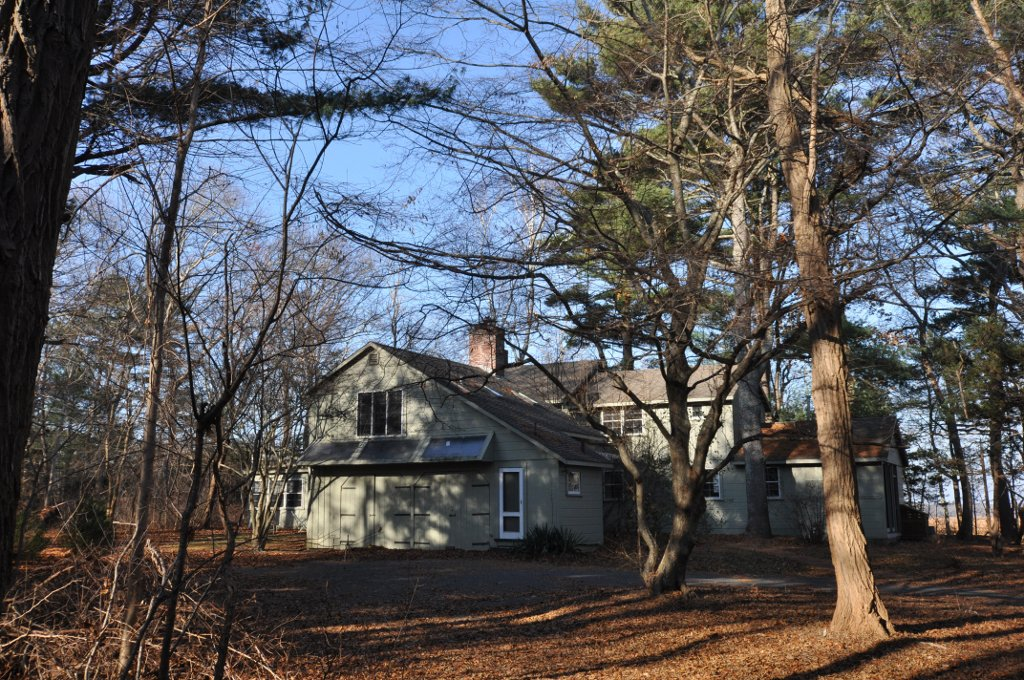

- Location within Massachusetts Location within the United States
- Location: Duxbury, Massachusetts
- Coordinates: 42°3′4″N 70°40′15″W
- Area: 3.2 acres (1.3 ha)
- Built: 1938
- Architect: Eleanor Raymond & Sarah P. Harkness; James W. Douglas & Son
- Architectural style: Modern Movement
- NRHP reference No.: 04001257
- Added to NRHP: November 27, 2004

The Pillsbury Summer House is a historic house at 45 Old Cove Road in Duxbury, Massachusetts. The two-story wood-frame house was built in 1938, and is a locally distinctive early example of Modern architecture, as the first major work of architect Sarah Pillsbury Harkness, and as a rare regional example of a Modern summer house. The house was designed by Harkness for her parents, in collaboration with Eleanor Raymond. The house was built in the same year that Bauhaus architect Walter Gropius built his house in Lincoln, Massachusetts; this house differs from his in that it draws more organically on New England traditional architecture.

The house was listed on the National Register of Historic Places in 2004.

== See also ==
- National Register of Historic Places listings in Plymouth County, Massachusetts
