= Colburn School–High Street Historic District =

Historic district in Massachusetts, United States

Coordinates: 42°14′07.78″N 71°13′08.51″W

- Colburn School–High Street; Historic District
- U.S. National Register of Historic Places
- U.S. Historic district
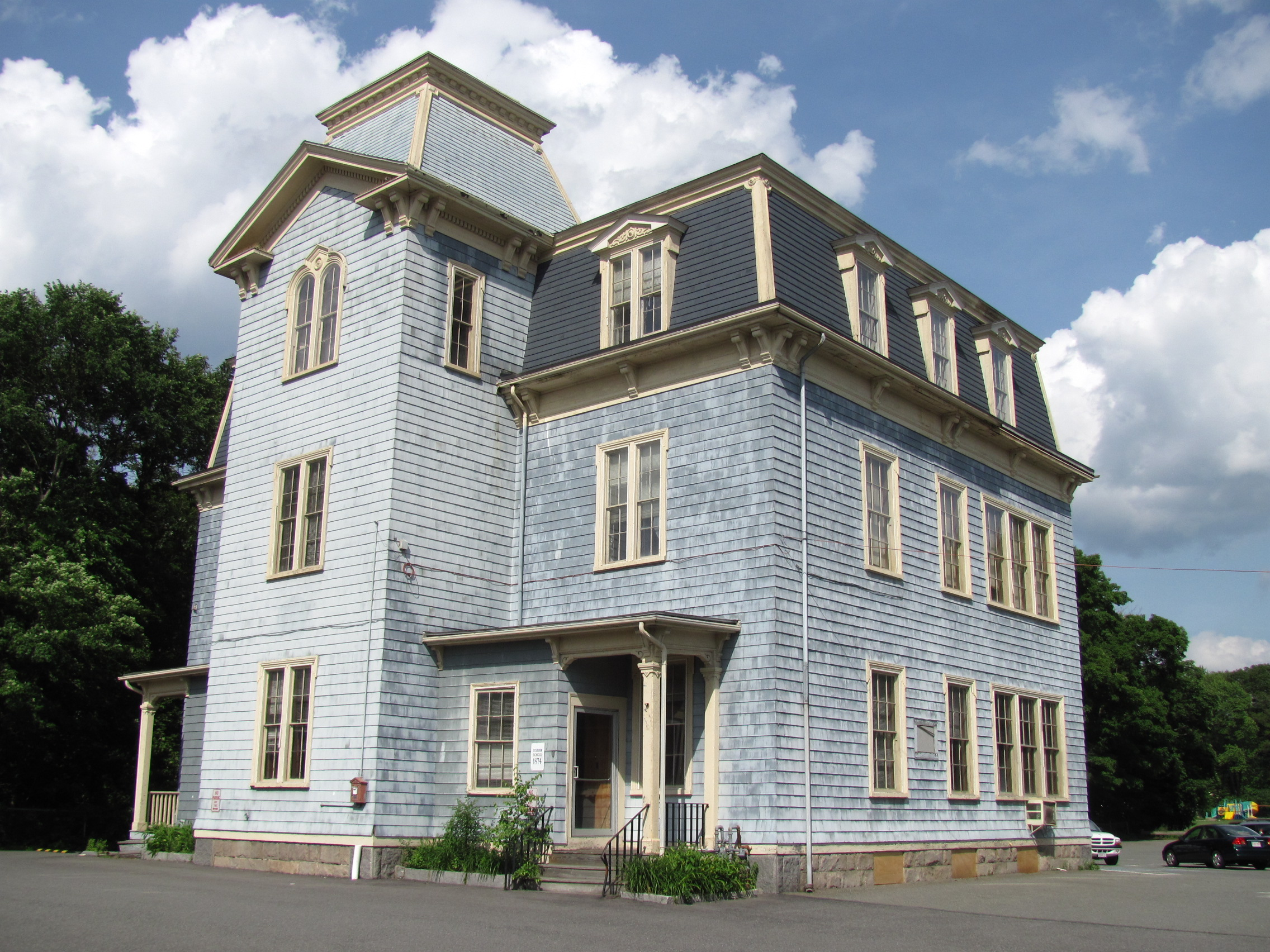
- Colburn School

- Location within Massachusetts Location within the United States
- Location: 369–649, 390–680 High Street, Westwood, Massachusetts
- Area: 40.5 acres (16.4 ha)
- NRHP reference No.: 00000641
- Added to NRHP: July 9, 2000

The Colburn School–High Street Historic District is a linear historic district encompassing the village center of Westwood, Massachusetts. It extends along High Street (Massachusetts Route 109) roughly between Conant Street in the north and Gay Street in the south. It is largely residential in character, with 37 houses, most of which date from the 18th to the mid-19th centuries. The rural character of the area is captured by a number of preserved 19th-century barns. The district also includes Westwood Town Hall, a 1910 Classical Revival building, and the 1874 Second Empire Colburn School. The school was named for Warren and Dana P. Colburn who both attended the school. They authored a book on arithmetic. Prior to being named for them in March 1867, it was known as the Clapboardtrees School, the West Dedham School and District Number Eight.

The district was listed on the National Register of Historic Places in 2000.

== See also ==
- National Register of Historic Places listings in Norfolk County, Massachusetts

== Works cited ==
- Slafter, Carlos (1905). A Record of Education: The Schools and Teachers of Dedham, Massachusetts 1644-1904. Dedham Transcript Press. "1642-3."
