= Buckmaster Pond =

Lake of the United States of America

- Location within Massachusetts
- Location: Westwood, Massachusetts
- Coordinates: 42°12′30″N 71°13′53″W
- Type: kettle pond
- Part of: Charles River Watershed
- Primary outflows: Rock Meadow Brook
- Surface area: 36.4 ares (0.364 ha)
- Max. depth: 20 feet (6.1 m)

Buckmaster Pond is a kettle pond located in Westwood, Massachusetts.

== History ==
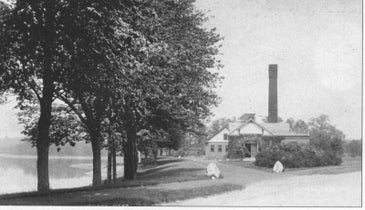
Pumping Station on South Side of Pond in 1910

The pond is a kettle, a small pond created by glacial melt-water during the last glacial maximum. It is named after John Buckmaster, an early settler who died in 1752 and was the first person to be buried in the Old Westwood Cemetery. The pond appears in historical records as early as 1827, when it was used for baptisms.

In 1885, when Westwood was part of the town of Dedham as the Parish of West Dedham, the water rights of the pond were sold to the neighboring town of Norwood. The anger around selling off of a local water source was a contributing reason for the parish to split from Dedham, which is when Westwood was incorporated as a town in 1897. Norwood built a pumping station and continued to use the pond as a water source until the late 1970s, when it was discontinued due to unidentified contamination and cheaper water being available from the water district that would become the MWRA.

== Recreation ==
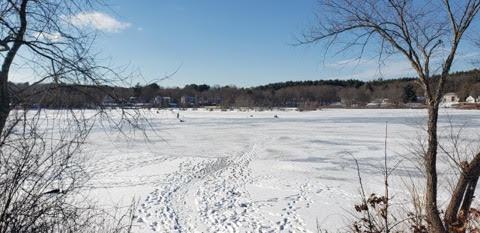

Along with kayaking and boating, the pond is a popular local fishing site. The fish including brown trout, largemouth bass, chain pickerel, and catfish have been caught in the pond.
