= Hale Education =

Educational organization in Massachusetts, United States

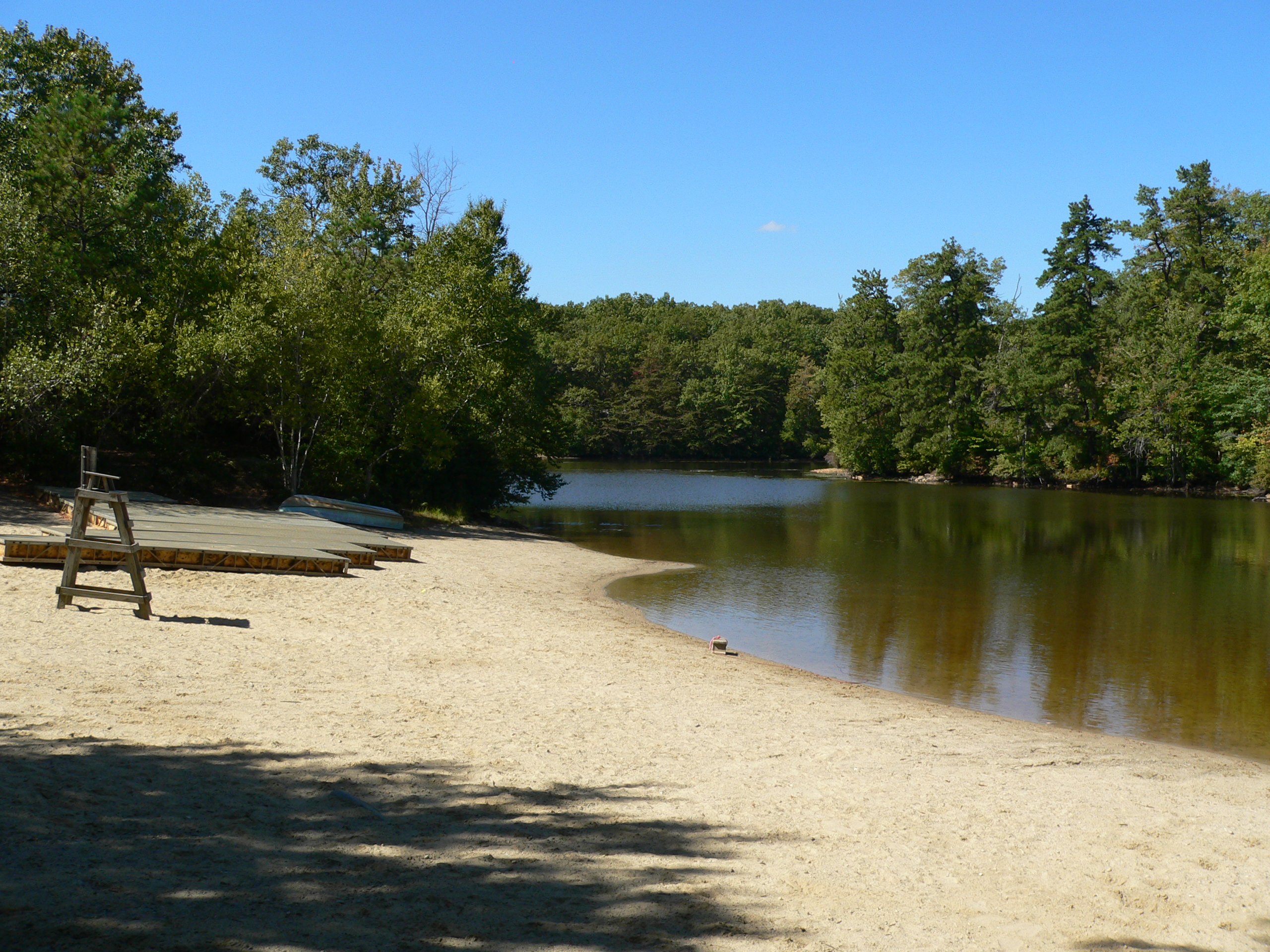
- Interactive map of Hale Education
- Location: 80 Carby Street; Westwood, Massachusetts, U.S.
- Coordinates: 42°14′13″N 71°14′13″W
- Area: 1,137 acres (460 ha)
- Created: 1918
- Website: hale1918.org

Hale Education is a private non-profit educational organization with over 1,100 acres of land, 20 miles of trails, and 4 ponds in Westwood and Dover, Massachusetts. Hale is best known for its youth summer camps, as well as its year-round educational programs.

== History ==
Work on acquiring land property was begun by Robert Sever Hale (brother of Richard Walden Hale, Boston law firm founder) in the early 1900s. In 1918, he established a formal tie with the Boy Scouts of America and began the organization. In 1926, the organization became known as the Dover-Westwood Scout Reservation of the Boston Council. Twenty acres were opened as a scout camp during that year under the name Camp Storrow as well. The Dover-Westwood Scout Reservation continued to acquire land through the 1930s. In 1930, the organization was named Scoutland. In 1941, Robert Sever Hale died and Scoutland was renamed the Robert Sever Hale Camping Reservation in his honor. In 1993, the organization's name was changed to the Hale Reservation, Inc. During its rebranding in 2015, the name was shortened to Hale.

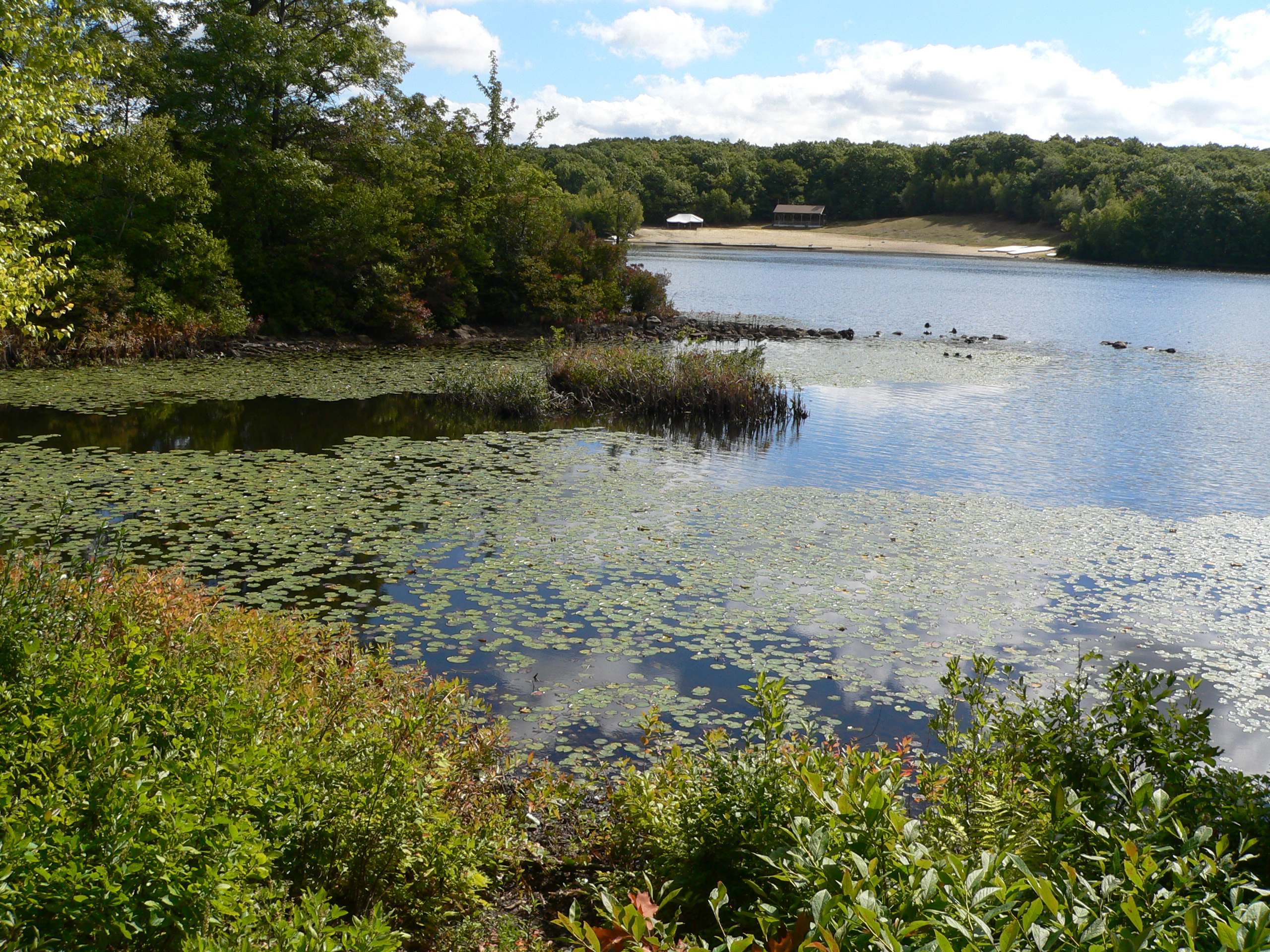
Noanet Pond at Hale

Hale's land includes numerous ponds and streams, miles of trails, a 3600 BCE Native American felsite quarry, and multiple stone walls and foundations from colonial-era farmhouses. Many of Hale's "wide" trails were originally dirt roadways used by oxen teams to drag granite blocks from multiple abandoned granite quarries en route to construction sites in Dedham, Boston, and beyond.

== Activities ==
Hale Day Camp is accredited by the American Camp Association and offers a wide variety of summer camp experiences. Hale offers a Traditional Camp that includes classic camp activities for various age groups as well as an Adventure Camp that includes tracks for hiking and mountain biking. Its Counselor-in-Training (CIT) program prepares teens to serve as leaders. Children from preschool to high school may attend. In addition, Hale offers the Hale Outdoor Learning Adventures (HOLA) program which brings Boston Public Schools students to experience camp with an educational focus. The HOLA program is part of a national study to assess and address the effects of summer learning loss.

Hale also has several partners that offer programs to the children they serve. These partners include the Greater Boston YMCA, Bird Street Community Center, the Watertown Boys and Girls Club, and Mass General Hospital's Aspire program for children with Asperger's syndrome. While summer day camp programs are what Hale is best known for, the programs go much, much deeper. Hale Summer Club serves families throughout the area and offers swimming, boating, arts and crafts, ropes, and environmental education.

The School, College and Corporate Programs that Hale offers bring groups from public and private schools, colleges, universities, and corporations to Hale for one day or multiple days to take advantage of outdoor classroom, teambuilding, and a universal challenge course.

Hale also offers several family-friendly events that support the financial aid and the various programs on the property. In 2017, Obstacle Adventure Race and a Swim-a-thon were held. Hale also raises funds via its Boston Marathon team and is an Official Charity of the Boston Athletic Association.

Hale facilities are available for rent for weddings, holiday parties, and family gatherings.

Hale's trail system is open for use by the public.

== Proposed conservation restriction ==
In 2019, Hale Education proposed that the towns of Westwood and Dover, along with private donors, purchase a conservation restriction on Hale's land. To study the proposal, Westwood created the Hale Task Force and Dover created the Hale Partnership Task Force. An organization named Save Hale was created to support the proposal. The Westwood Land Trust and The Trustees of Reservations (whose Noanet Woodlands reservation is adjacent to Hale) also announced their support for the plan.

In January 2022, the Dover task force recommended that the town move forward with the proposal. In June 2022, the Westwood task force made a similar recommendation. Voters will be asked in late 2023 to approve the expenditure of $10 million by each town as contributions to the purchase of the conservation restriction.
