= Ethel B. Power =

American architect and magazine editor

- Born: 1881
- Died: 1969 (aged 87–88)
- Education: Cambridge School of Architecture and Landscape Architecture (1920)
- Occupation: Architect

Ethel B. Power (1881–1969) was an architect and the editor of House Beautiful magazine.

Power championed a generation of women architects who emerged from the newly founded Cambridge School of Architecture and Landscape Architecture. She also published a compilation of plans for small houses by notable architects of the day.

== Publishing career ==
=== House Beautiful ===
Power was the editor of the influential shelter magazine House Beautiful (1923–34) for more than a decade. She also often published her own articles. She championed the work of Cambridge School graduates in general, and in particular on Eleanor Raymond's work, many of which she wrote herself. When in 1934 the magazine was sold and its editorial offices transferred to New York City, Power resigned because she did not choose to leave Boston.

=== The Smaller American Home ===
Her book The Smaller American Home (1927) is a compilation of 55 designs by notable architects of the 1910s and 1920s, with a focus on built-in features. She includes floor plans of houses in the Colonial, Spanish Revival, Creole cottage, and Storybook house styles together with shots of example interiors and landscaping.

Selected architects included Dwight James Baum, Wallace Frost, John F. Staub, Wallace Neff, Eleanor Raymond, and Henry Atherton Frost. Unlike some critics of the day who liked to position historicist and modernist architecture as antithetical to each other, Power stressed the features the two approaches shared, such as simple rectilinear plans and absence of ornamentation.

A portfolio of materials about Raymond's architectural work held by the museum Historic New England includes a number of articles by Power about Raymond.

== Education and personal life ==
Power was part of the first cohort to enter the Cambridge School of Architecture and Landscape Architecture in 1915. This group included her life partner, architect Eleanor Raymond (1887–1989), whom she had previously met through a suffragist organization. She graduated in 1920. Power and Raymond remained together for more than half a century, until Power's death. They resided on Beacon Hill in Boston.

== Publications ==
- The Smaller American House (1927)
- "Variation on the Colonial," House Beautiful (1935)
