= Robert Steele (drum major) =

Drum Major Robert Steele (c. 1760 – June 22, 1833) was an America Revolutionary War drummer and drum major.

Steele was born in about 1760 in Massachusetts. A month after the Battles of Lexington and Concord, at the age of fifteen, he joined the Continental Army as a drummer boy. He took part in the Battle of Bunker Hill.

He served throughout the war and was promoted to Drum Major by the time the Revolution was won. He retired to West Dedham, Massachusetts in 1783.

Before Steele died on June 22, 1833, he married a woman named Lydia and both are buried in the Old Westwood Cemetery in Westwood, Massachusetts.
