= Concentrated solar still =

High-output water distillation and purification system using solar energy

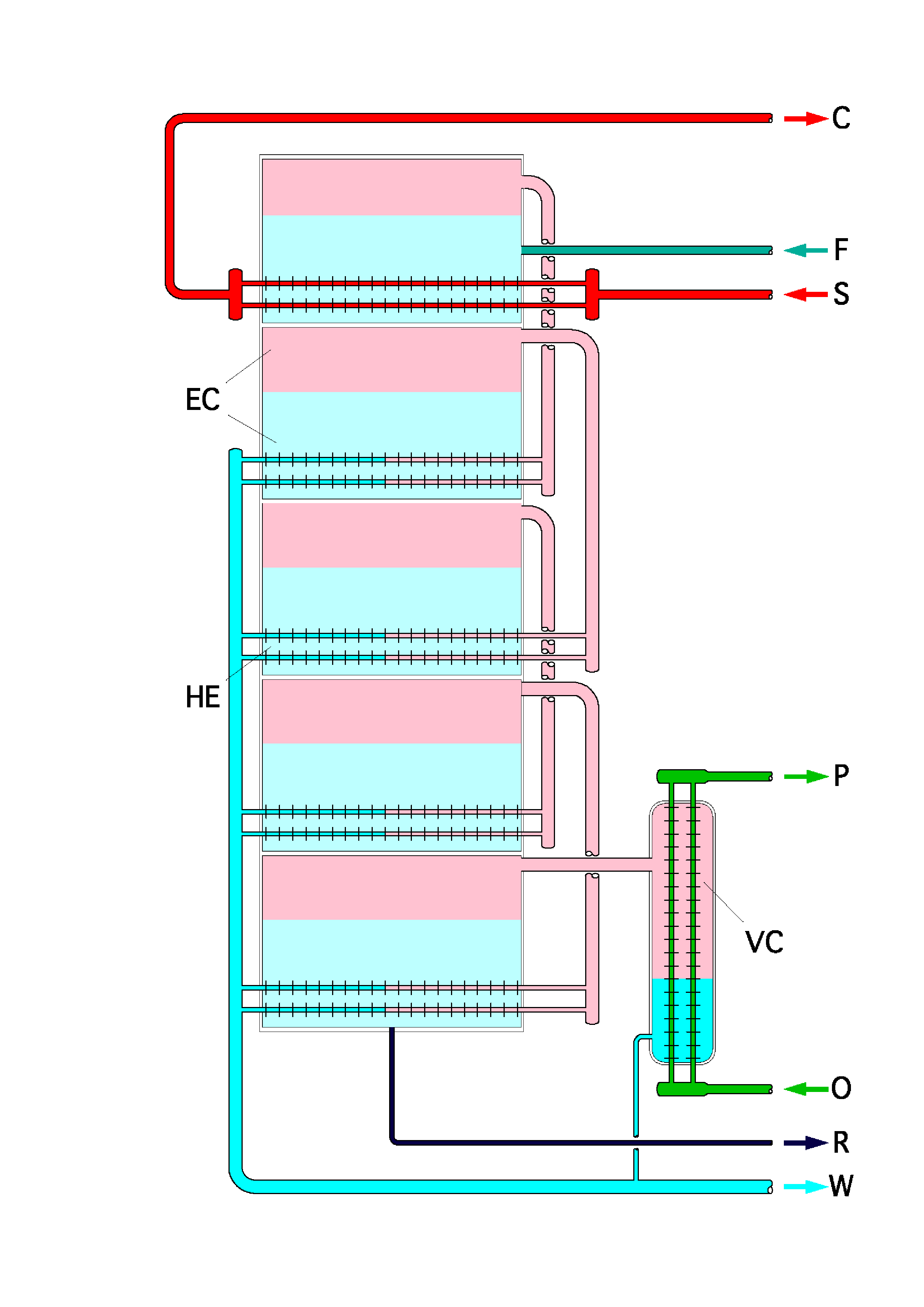
Multiple-Effect Evaporator

A concentrated solar still is a system that uses the same quantity of solar heat input (same solar collection area) as a simple solar still but can produce a volume of freshwater that is many times greater. While a simple solar still is a way of distilling water by using the heat of the sun to drive evaporation from a water source and ambient air to cool a condenser film, a concentrated solar still uses a concentrated solar thermal collector to concentrate solar heat and deliver it to a multi-effect evaporation process for distillation, thus increasing the natural rate of evaporation. The concentrated solar still is capable of large-scale water production in areas with plentiful solar energy.

== Performance ==
The concentrated solar still can produce as much as twenty times more water than the theoretical maximum of a standard solar still and in practice, can produce as much as 30x the volume.

A typically 25% efficiency standard solar still (not allowing for any recovery of rejected latent heat), as the latent heat of vaporization of water is 2.26 MJ per kilogram, should evaporate 2.4 kg (or liters) of water per m^{2} per day in a region with an average daily solar irradiation of 21.6 MJ/m^{2} (250 watts/m^{2}), or 873 liters per year (like a precipitation height of 873 mm, 2.86 ft). A twenty times more productive still would have a daily output of 48 mm (1.9 in) or 17.5 m (57 ft) yearly.

== Heat integration ==
=== Multiple stage evaporation ===
The concentrated solar still implements a method for recovering the latent heat of the distillate vapor not captured and reused by a standard solar still. This is done by using multiple stages of evaporation in series (see multiple-effect evaporator). The latent heat of the distillate vapor produced in the n-1 stage (or effect) is recovered in the nth stage by boiling the leftover concentrated brine from the n-1 stage which produces distillate vapor whose latent heat will be recovered in the n+1 stage by boiling the leftover concentrated brine from the nth stage. Since brine is continuously concentrated in each stage, its boiling point will continue to rise under standard conditions. To overcome the boiling point elevation of the brine, each evaporator stage operates at a lower pressure than the previous stage, which effectively reduces the boiling point, allowing for sufficient heat transfer to take place in each stage. This process can be repeated until the distillate conditions are sufficiently degraded (i.e., pressure and temperature are very low and the distillate vapor volume is very large).

=== Heat pump ===
The final evaporation stage produces distillate vapor that is considered to be at very poor state conditions. This vapor can either be condensed in a final condenser, in which case its latent heat will be shed as waste, or it can be condensed by using a heat pump, in which case its latent heat (or a portion of it) can be recovered. In the latter case, the heat pump effectively "upgrades" the state conditions of the latent heat to more usable conditions (higher temperature and pressure) by performing work (e.g., compression). The conditions can be sufficiently upgraded such that the recovered heat can be used to provide additional heat for evaporation in the first effect.
