= Sarah P. Harkness =

American architect (1914–2013)

Sarah Pillsbury Harkness (July 8, 1914 – May 22, 2013) was an American architect. She was a co-founder of The Architects Collaborative (TAC), an influential design firm that operated between the years of 1945 and 1995 based in Cambridge, Massachusetts. At TAC, she was partner-in-charge on a wide range of building projects, particularly for educational institutions. She was author, co-author, and editor of numerous writings on the topic of design. She was one of the founders of the Six Moon Hill neighborhood in Lexington, Massachusetts where she lived for over 60 years.

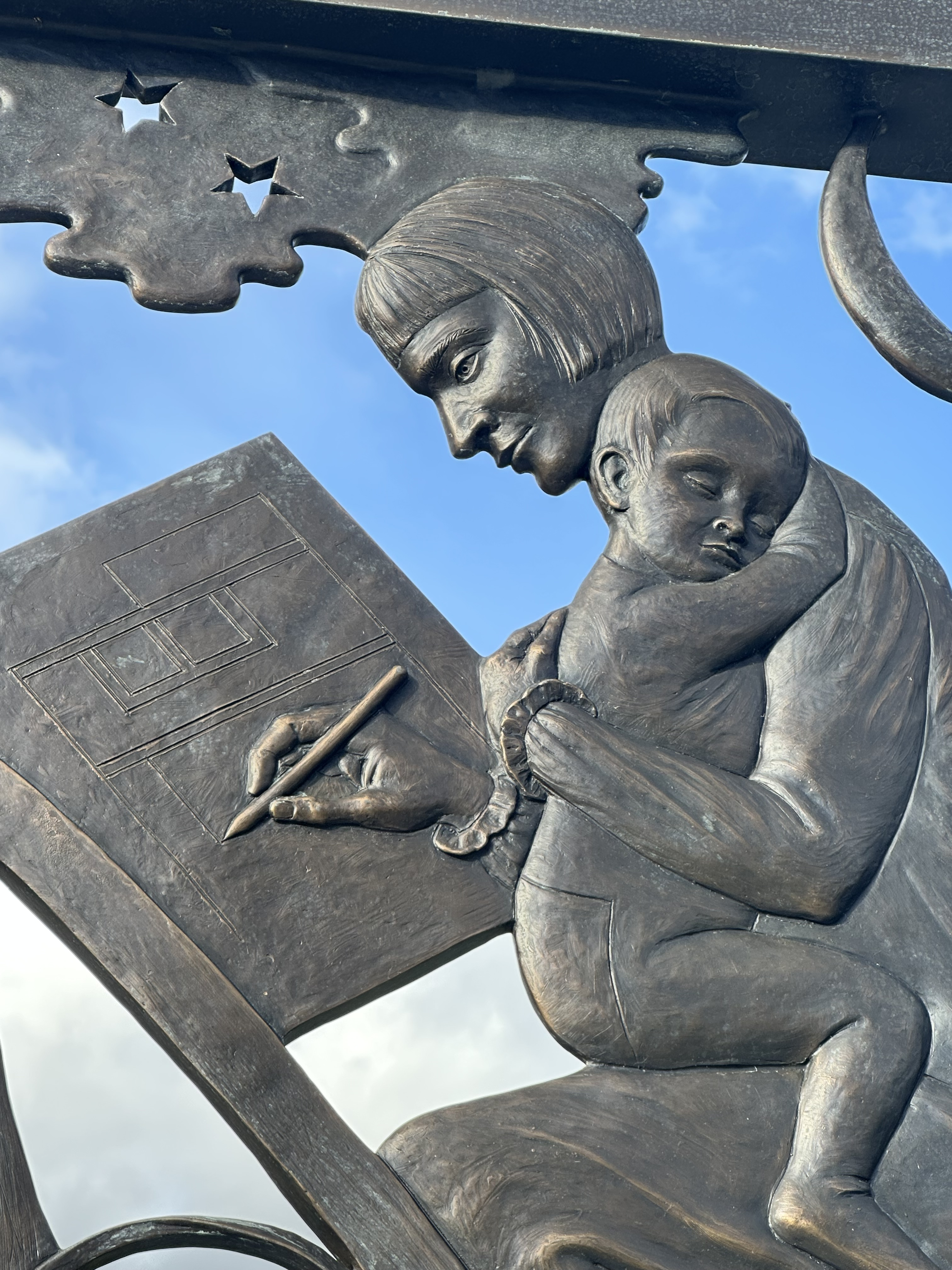
A combined image of Sarah P. Harkness and Jean Bodman Fletcher within the Lexington Women's Liberty Monument in Lexington, Massachusetts

== Early life and education ==
Born Sarah Pillsbury in Swampscott, Massachusetts, but called "Sally", she was the daughter of Samuel Hale Pillsbury, a lawyer, and the former Helen Farrington Watters. She graduated from the Winsor School and then from the Cambridge School of Architecture and Landscape Architecture (affiliated with Smith College).

In 1974, She received a Doctor of Fine Arts degree from Bates College.

== Early career ==
Sally's first architectural project was a summer house for her parents in Duxbury, Massachusetts which she completed as a student at the Cambridge School. In this work she was supervised by Eleanor Raymond also a graduate of the school. The Pillsbury Summer House was listed on the National Register of Historic Places in 2004, and is still in use as a private summer home.

Despite Harkess's success in this first project, she struggled to find architectural opportunities following graduation. She saw this as the inherent bias "against being a girl." She did gain useful professional experience and contacts in a short-lived business venture to distribute Artek furniture designed by the Finnish team of Alvar Aalto and Aino Aalto.

During World War II both she and her new husband John Cheesman Harkness (known as "Chip") interviewed at the architectural firm Skidmore, Owings, & Merrill. He was offered a job and worked briefly at the firm. In an interview with Professor Wendy Cox in later life, Sally said that the partner there (probably Louis Skidmore) claimed "he had never hired a woman in this office and we never <would>" Instead she began work at a company that developed a novel type of packable furniture made from plywood called Pakto. She worked there between 1941-43. Her next position, (1943–44) was with the Museum of Modern Art where she worked on preparation of traveling exhibitions.

== The Architects Collaborative ==
Sally and Chip Harkness were among the founding partners of The Architects Collaborative ("TAC") in 1946. Walter Gropius, then teaching at the Harvard Graduate School of Design was asked to join and became the last and eighth of the founders. Despite his reputation as a pioneer of modern architecture and founder of the Bauhaus school he did not take a more senior role in the firm than the others.

The "collaborative" in the name represented a deeply held belief in a less individualistic, star-driven way of working. In 1966 Sally wrote, "The essence of collaboration is the strength of the individual. When collaboration is operating as it should, a good idea can be carried with conviction, recognized by others without loss of their own prestige. The spirit of exploration and invention, led by philopsophy, can be present in an office. Ideas are welcomed from wherever they come. Archtectural music is orchestral rather than solo. Every member is involved." In the Cox interview, she said "Collaboration is a rare and wonderful thing; it is something to strive for as opposed to competition. The idea of people contributing something to the solution of the problem is quite wonderful. You feel great if you have been able to make a contribution, even if it’s only “I’m the one who thought of moving the wall from there to there.” And it made all the difference, and I feel proud. But you have to have an attitude about it. You have to care more about the thing than you care about your own success."

As described by Kubo, much thought was given at TAC to how the partners could work most effectively together, striking a balance between individual and collective authority. This included requiring founders to take responsibility for both creative and managerial decisions and even having a rotating schedule for who would be responsible for handling the mail. In its heyday, TAC was the largest architectural firm in the United States and took on a wide array of building projects in the US and abroad.

Among the TAC innovations was the way they accommodated the working schedules of the two founding partners who were mothers, Sally and Jean B. Fletcher. This approach was featured in a 1947 Boston Globe article entitled "No Woman Should Stay Home: Two Cambridge Wives Solve Career Problem."

One of TAC's earliest projects (1947) was the development of a new neighborhood in Lexington, Massachusetts which they named Six Moon Hill. Each of the partners developed a house for themselves with the exception of Gropius who already had a home (Gropius House) in nearby Lincoln, Massachusetts. The approach taken in the development of the neighborhood, was indicative of their insistence on fairness. The approximately 20-acre parcel was divided into 29 lots, which were then assigned by drawing names out of hat. The houses that were built stood out from the historic colonial architecture in Lexington and new Cape Cod style houses being built at the time. They incorporated skylights, flat or butterfly roofs, frameless windows, and large expanses of glass. Careful siting maximized winter sun and large eaves facing west protected against strong summer light. Sally lived in the house she designed with Chip for over 60 years until her death in 2013.

As a partner at TAC, Sally played the role of "partner-in-charge" on many of TAC's architectural commissions. Many of the projects were for educational institutions.

== TAC projects as partner-in-charge ==
Year	Role	Name	Institution	Location
1947-48	TAC Partner-in-Charge (With Chip Harkness)	Harkness House	Six Moon Hill	Lexington, Massachusetts
1960-66	TAC Partner-in-Charge (With Chip Harkness)	Fox Lane Middle School	Bedford Public School District	Bedford, New York
1962-67	TAC Partner-in-Charge	C. Thurston Chase Learning Center	Eaglebrook School	Deerfield, Massachusetts
1968-70	TAC Partner-in-Charge (With Norman Fletcher)	Addition	Worcester Art Museum	Worcester, Massachusetts
1967-71	TAC Partner-in-Charge (With H. Morse Payne)	Anita Tuvin Schlechter Auditorium	Dickinson College	Carlisle, Pennsylvania
1970-73	TAC Partner-in-Charge (With Chip Harkness)	Ladd Library	Bates College	Lewiston, Maine
1978-86	TAC Partner-in-Charge	Olin Arts Center	Bates College	Lewiston, Maine
1978-83	TAC Partner-in-Charge (with Peter Morton)	Headquarters	Tennessee Valley Authority	Chattanooga, Tennessee
1976-80	TAC Partner-in-charge (with Dave Sheffield)	Merrill Gymnasium	Bates College	Lewiston, Maine

Her experience with furniture design was reflected in her design for an independent study unit or carrell for the Bedford, New York middle school. The goal of the carrel was to provide each student with a study space and privacy. This space consisted of a study space, dining area and coat storage. When introducing the study unit to the school, a choice was made that two-thirds of the students would have a carrel and one-third would not. This decision was made through the assumption that not all students would be ready for the independence that the carrel provides. The carrels were placed with the storage units, this allowed students to choose between working with their table-mate or independently. For students to be social for lunch, the tables were moved away from the storage units and combined together, making enough room for six students to eat at the combined table. The carrels also had screens that could be used to divide the students into groups. All the students' belongings were in their carrel, including coats which were hung on pegs at the end of the storage units.

== Writings ==
Harkness was author, co-author, and editor of numerous writings about design. She co-edited with Walter Gropius the 1966 monograph about The Architects Collaborative and contributed to its writing. In 1976 she co-authored a book on specific design considerations for accommodating people with disabilities, Building without Barriers for the Disabled. She was an early proponent of environmental considerations in design. In The Solar Section: Starting Point of Passive Design, published in the AIA Journal in 1981, she wrote about the importance of understanding the impact of the direction of the sun's light. In 1985, she co-authored a book on sustainable design.

A full bibliography of writing by and about Harkness can be found as part of her profile by Michael's Kubo on the Pioneering Women in American Architecture website.

== Professional affiliations and honors ==
- 1941 Prize, The Boston Society of Architects
- 1967 The design of the Fox Lane Middle School in Bedford, New York, The American Association of School Administrators Award
- 1967 Honor Award for the design of the Chase Learning Center of the Eaglebrook School in Deerfield, Massachusetts, The American Institute of Architects
- 1979 Fellow, American Institute of Architects
- 1987 The design of the Olin Arts Center at Bates College, The American School and University of Louis I. Kahn Citation
- 1991 Award of Honor, The Boston Society of Architects

== Work and motherhood ==
Sarah P. Harkness and Jean B. Fletcher were the only two female founding partners of TAC. They were both mothers, with Harkness having seven children and Fletcher having six. The women worked together to create a schedule that made it possible to work at the firm and to meet the responsibilities as mothers. The women worked half days; Fletcher would work in the morning and Harkness would work in the afternoon. The women also shared the same baby-sitter.

== Additional information ==
Her papers are stored at the International Archive of Women in Architecture.

Harkness was elected as fellow to the American Institute of Architects in 1979. Harkness was a registered architect in both Massachusetts and Tennessee.

In 1981, she was a mentor of architect Cheryl L. McAfee.

Harkness was interviewed along with other then surviving founders of TAC in the 2006 documentary "Still Standing: Conversations With Three Founding Partners of The Architects Collaborative".
