= Katherine Doherty =

American child actress

Katherine Leigh Doherty
- Born: Dover, Massachusetts, U.S.
- Education: Brown University
- Occupation: Journalist

Katherine Leigh Doherty is an American business reporter for Bloomberg News. She was formerly a child actress who performed in the Broadway cast of "Mary Poppins" as Jane Banks. She appeared on the Disney Channel show "Disney 365" giving a tour of the Mary Poppins set. Doherty played the role of Fredrika Armfeldt in A Little Night Music on Broadway opposite Catherine Zeta-Jones from November 2009 to January 2010.

== Biography ==
As a child, she performed with various theatre organizations. Her first professional show was in Irving Berlin's White Christmas. She has also played the lead in the Regis College production of Still Life with Iris in the Spring of 2006.

Doherty is from Dover, Massachusetts and attended the summer camp Stagedoor Manor for aspiring performing artists. Doherty finished a Dover-Sherborn Middle School production of Guys and Dolls, starring as Sarah Brown, the missionary in the production. Doherty also played the lead role in the musical "Annie", with Open Fields theater group. Katherine has been in many Open Fields productions since she was a little girl. In Spring 2009, she played a primary hotel girl and was Andrea Ross's under-study (for Millie) in the Noble and Greenough School's Spring Musical, Thoroughly Modern Millie. She performed in Noble and Greenough's production of Bat Boy, as Shelley.

Doherty has been in several community theatre plays, such as The Secret Garden, where she starred as Mary Lennox and received a Best Child Actor EMACT Award, The Sound of Music, Sara Crewe: A Little Princess, and she has sung the national anthem and God Bless America at Fenway Park in Boston and Gillette Stadium in Foxborough.
