= Mária Telkes =

Hungarian-American engineer, scientist and inventor (1900–1995)

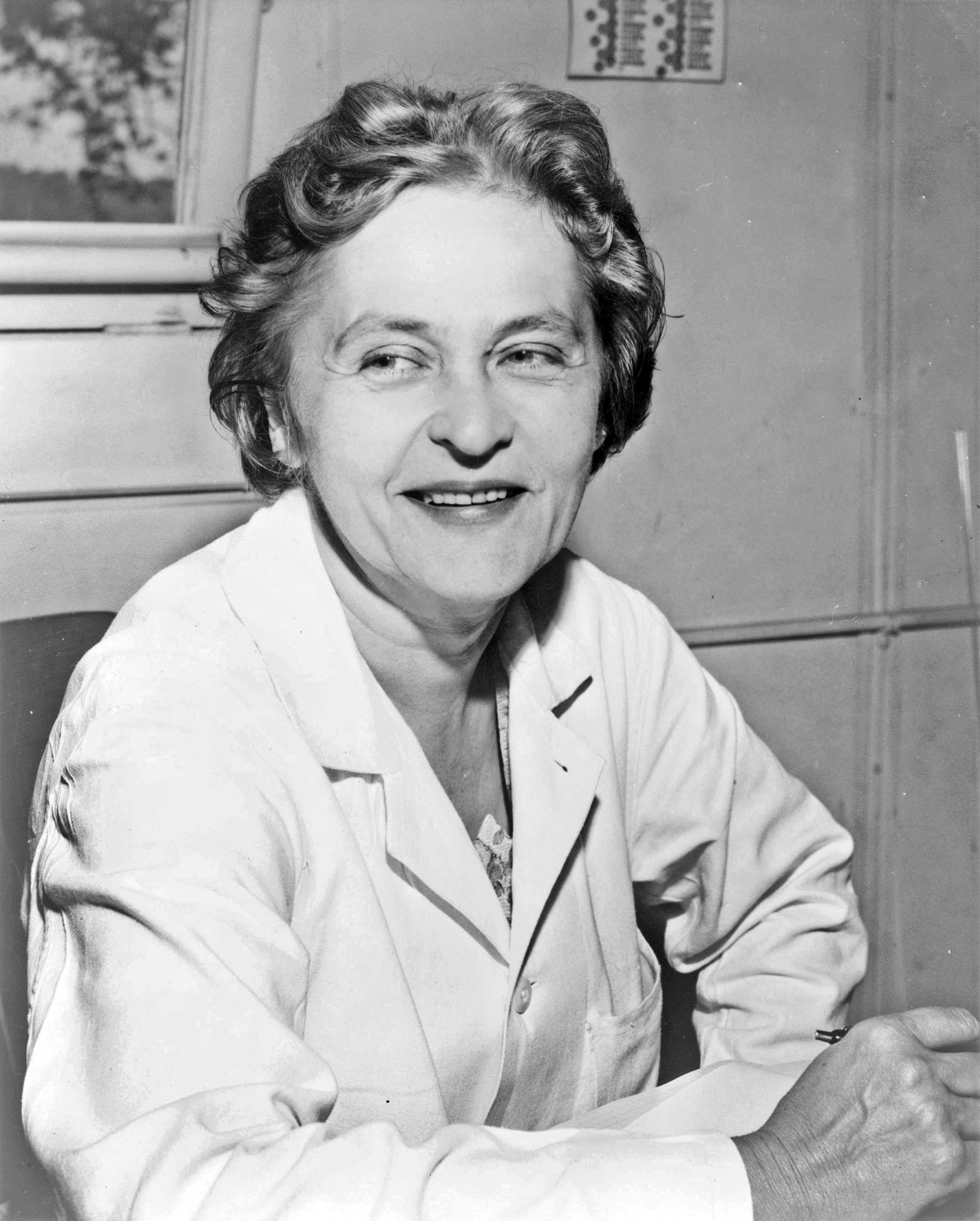
- Telkes in 1956
- Born: 12 December 1900; Budapest, Austria-Hungary
- Died: 2 December 1995 (aged 94); Budapest, Hungary
- Other name: Sun Queen
- Education: University of Budapest, Ph.D. Physical Chemistry
- Known for: Solar Energy Technologies
- Board member of: Solar Energy Society
- Awards: National Inventors Hall of Fame, Society of Women Engineers Achievement Award, National Academy of Sciences, Building Research Advisory Board Award
- Engineering career
- Discipline: Physics, Thermoelectricity
- Institutions: Cleveland Clinic Foundation, Westinghouse, Massachusetts Institute of Technology, New York University, University of Delaware
- Projects: Water-powered Desalination machines, Dover Sun House, Solar powered oven
- Significant advance: Solar heating, cooling, and thermal storage systems (several patents)

Mária Telkes (December 12, 1900 – December 2, 1995) was a Hungarian-American biophysicist, engineer, and inventor who worked on solar energy technologies.

She moved to the United States in 1925 to work as a biophysicist. She became an American citizen in 1937 and started work at the Massachusetts Institute of Technology (MIT) to create practical uses of solar energy in 1939.

During World War II, she developed a solar water distillation device, deployed at the end of the war, which saved the lives of downed airmen and torpedoed sailors. Her goal was to create a version for villagers in poor and arid regions. Telkes, often called by colleagues The Sun Queen, is considered one of the founders of solar thermal storage systems. After the war, she became an associate research professor at MIT.

In the 1940s she and architect Eleanor Raymond created one of the first solar-heated houses, Dover Sun House, by storing energy each day. In 1953 they created a solar oven for people at various latitudes that could be used by children.

In 1952, Telkes became the first recipient of the Society of Women Engineers Achievement Award. She was awarded a lifetime achievement award from the National Academy of Sciences, subsequently receiving a Building Research Advisory Board Award in 1977. Telkes registered more than 20 patents.

== Early life and education ==
Telkes was born in Budapest, Hungary, in 1900 to Aladár and Mária (née Lábán) de Telkes. Her grandfather Simon Telkes was from a Jewish family. In 1881, her father magyarized the family name to Telkes. In 1883 he converted to the Unitarian faith. In 1907 he was elevated to the Hungarian nobility, with the prefix kelenföldi.

From an early age, Telkes was interested in chemistry, making her own chemistry set at age 10. Her father encouraged her explorations. Raised in Budapest, she embarked on a journey in physical chemistry at the University of Budapest, earning her Bachelor of Arts in 1920. In her first year there, she read an influential book, "Energy Sources of the Future" by Kornel Zelowitch. She said that book influenced her in deciding to go to the United States, since most solar energy work was being done there at that time. Her academic pursuits continued as she pursued a Ph.D. in physical chemistry at the University of Budapest, where she was a lecturer in physics from 1923 to 1924, completing her doctoral studies in 1924.

Following her educational achievements, Telkes became an instructor at the University of Geneva in 1924. However, her life took a turn when, after visiting a relative who served as the Hungarian consul in Cleveland, Ohio, she decided to immigrate to the United States.

== Career ==
Telkes moved to the United States in 1925, and visited a relative who was the Hungarian consul in Cleveland, Ohio. There, she was hired to work at the Cleveland Clinic Foundation, which was founded in 1921 by biomedical researcher George W. Crile, to investigate the energy produced by living organisms. Telkes did some research while working at the foundation, and under the leadership of George Washington Crile, they invented a photoelectric mechanism that could record brain waves. They also worked together to write a book called Phenomenon of Life.

Becoming an American citizen in 1937 marked a pivotal moment in Telkes's life. That same year, she transitioned to a research engineer role at Westinghouse Electricand Manufacturing Company in Pittsburgh, Pennsylvania. She initially focused on developing metal alloys for thermocouples to convert heat into electricity. Her venture into solar energy research began in 1939. As part of the Solar Energy Conversion Project at MIT, she investigated thermoelectric devices powered by sunlight. She was at MIT for 13 years and then at New York University for five years.

Her most notable innovation was the invention of the solar distiller and the development of the first solar-powered heating system designed for residential use. In addition, Telkes also devised various devices capable of harnessing and utilizing energy stored from sunlight.

Telkes aimed to address the reliance on traditional heating methods, often powered by non-renewable energy sources. Her work sought to provide sustainable and environmentally friendly alternatives, particularly in the context of residential heating.

=== Desalination ===
During World War II, the United States government, noting Telkes's expertise, recruited her to serve as a civilian advisor to the Office of Scientific Research and Development (OSRD). There, she developed a solar-powered water desalination machine, completing a prototype in 1942. It came to be one of her most notable inventions because it helped soldiers get clean water in difficult situations and also helped solve water problems in the US Virgin Islands.

However, its initial deployment was delayed until the end of the war because Hoyt C. Hottel repeatedly re-negotiated the manufacturing contracts for the machine.

For this work, she received a Certificate of Merit in 1945 from the OSRD and on March 15, 1952, the Society of Women Engineers awarded her their first Achievement Award "for her wartime method of distilling water from salt water by solar heat."

=== Heat storage ===
Telkes identified thermal energy storage as the most "critical problem" facing designers of a workable solar-heated house. One of her specialties was phase-change materials that absorb or release heat when they change from solid to liquid. She hoped to use phase-change materials like molten salts for storing thermal energy in active heating systems. One of her materials of choice was Glauber's salt (sodium sulfate).

Hottel, as chairman of the solar energy fund at MIT, originally supported Telkes's approach. He wrote that "Dr. Telkes' contribution may make a big difference in the outcome of our project". However, he was both less interested in and more skeptical about solar power, compared to Telkes. Telkes, like the project's funder Godfrey Lowell Cabot, was a "fervent believer in solar energy". There were personality clashes between Hottel and Telkes.

In 1946, the group tried to use Glauber's salt in the design of their second solar house. Hottel and others blamed Telkes for problems with the material. In spite of support from university president Karl Compton, Telkes was reassigned to the metallurgy department, where she continued her work on thermocouples. Although she was no longer involved in the MIT solar fund, Cabot would have liked her to return. He encouraged her to continue working on the problem independently.

=== Dover Sun House ===
In 1948, Telkes started working on the Dover Sun House; she teamed up with architect Eleanor Raymond, with the project financed by philanthropist and sculptor Amelia Peabody. The system was designed so that Glauber's salt would melt in the sun, trap the heat, and then release it as it cooled and hardened.

The system worked with the sunlight passing through glass windows, which would heat the air inside the glass. This heated air then passed through a metal sheet into another air space. From there, fans moved the air to a storage compartment filled with the salt (sodium sulfate). These compartments were in between the walls, heating the house as the salt cooled.

For the first two years the house was successful, receiving tremendous publicity and drawing crowds of visitors. Popular Science hailed it as perhaps more important, scientifically, than the atom bomb. By the third winter, there were problems with the Glauber's salt: it had stratified into layers of liquid and solid, and its containers were corroded and leaking. The owners removed the solar heating system from their house, replacing it with an oil furnace. In 1950, Telkes and Raymond discussed the house at the MIT symposium of Space Heating with Solar Energy, where they explained how this experiment was also a stepping stone for future solar heated homes.

In 1953 George Russell Harrison, dean of science at MIT, called for a review of the solar fund at MIT, due to concerns about its lack of productivity. The resulting report tended to promote Hottel's views and disparaged both Cabot and Telkes. Telkes was fired by MIT in 1953 after the report came out.

Another solar house was built in Princeton NJ using the solar energy and thermal storage system developed by Telkes.

=== Solar-powered oven ===
By 1953, Telkes was working at the New York University College of Engineering where she continued to conduct solar energy research. Telkes received a grant from the Ford Foundation of $45,000 to develop a solar-powered oven so people who lack the technology around the world would be able to heat things. The project criteria included: "it had to be able to cook, boil, and bake according to any local custom", "durable, portable, and simple to use and clean", cheap, and it must be able to be used in the early evening (para. 39). Though not the first solar oven invented of this type (in India one was being used in low quantities for $14), its "simplicity and cheapness"(para. 3) was its hallmark with a projected cost of $5 in 1954. Using a tightly insulated box, four mirrors, a glass window, and "a special heat-absorbing chemical"(para. 3), it reached 350 degrees Fahrenheit (177 degrees Celsius) within 30 minutes. She was appointed Solar Research Director in 1958 for Curtis-Wright Corp. and New York University, over joint and separate solar energy projects.

Telkes spent several years in industry. Initially, she was the director of solar energy at the Curtiss-Wright Company. Next, she worked on materials for use in extreme conditions, such as space, at Cryo-Therm (1961–1963) as Director of Research and Development (para. 5). This work included helping to develop materials for use in the Apollo mission and Polaris missiles, specifically to help maintain constant temperatures for optimum missile functionality. From 1963–1969, she worked as director of solar energy at Melpar, Inc.

In 1964 she spoke at the first International Conference of Women Engineers and Scientists in New York.

"It is the things supposed to be impossible that interest me. I like to do things they say cannot be done." Mária Telkes, 1942.

In 1969 Telkes joined the Institute of Energy Conversion at the University of Delaware as an adjunct professor of Energy Conversion with a goal of substituting clean sun energy for "some of the polluting fuels". She began to study electricity-generating photovoltaic cells. In 1971 she helped to build the first house to generate both heat and electricity from the sun.

In January 1977, moving to Texas, she joined the Solar Energy Department of the American Technological University. Then, in 1980, she moved from Texas to Maryland with Monegon, Ltd. In 1981 she helped the US Department of Energy to develop and build the first fully solar-powered home, Carlisle House in Carlisle, Massachusetts. She continued inventing and filing patents into her 80s, and died December 2, 1995, at the age of 94, in her native Budapest, Hungary.

== Awards, accolades, honors, professional groups ==
Telkes was recognized many times for her work.

- 1945 – OSRD Certificate of Merit for the Desalination Unit
- 1952 – Inaugural Society of Women Engineers Achievement Award
- 1977 – Charles Greeley Abbot Award, American Section of the International Solar Energy Society "In recognition of (her) outstanding contributions to the utilization of solar energy for humankind"
- 1977 – Building Research Advisory Board for “significant contributions to building science and technology
- 2012 – Induction into the National Inventors Hall of Fame

The asteroid 390743 Telkesmária is named in her honor.

Telkes' work was recognized in a Google Doodle on December 12, 2022.

She is the subject of the documentary film The Sun Queen which first aired on American Experience on April 4, 2023.

She was a member of the Chemical Society, the Electrochemical Society, the Solar Energy Society (Board of Directors), Sigma Xi, and the Business and Professional Women’s Club, Society of Women Engineers.

== Patents & Papers ==
- Radiant Energy Heat Transfer Device: No. 2,595,905. May 6, 1952
- Heat Storage Unit: No. 2,677,367. May 4, 1954
- Composition of Matter for the Storage of Heat: No. 2,677,664. May 4, 1954
- Method and Apparatus for the Storage of Heat: No. 2,677,243. May 4, 1954
- Method and Apparatus for Storing and Releasing Heat: No. 2,808,494. October 1, 1957.
- Plus ten additional patents.

Telkes's papers are in the collections of the Arizona State University Library, Design and the Arts Special Collections, in Tempe, Arizona.

Telkes published over 100 papers, wrote book chapters, and ultimately some 50 patents.

== Legacy ==
Throughout her career, Mária Telkes amassed a collection of twenty patents (some sources say 50), spanning diverse methods related to heating, cooling, and heat storage technologies. Her contributions to the field of solar energy earned her the moniker of the "Sun Queen".

“I have been intensively interested in Chemistry and Physics during my high school days. I aimed to develop new energy sources, especially the use of Solar Energy. I have studied with this aim in mind, and nothing could have stopped me from working in this field. If I have succeeded to some extent, I feel that I enjoyed my scientific work more than any other activity.”

Telkes was known to say “You see, sunshine isn’t lethal – except perhaps in the form of sunburn” (SWE Achievement Award Citation).

Telkes was also involved in the World Symposium on Applied Solar Energy, held in Phoenix Arizona, in 1995, where she championed the importance of solar energy as fossil fuel resources dwindled.

In addition, Telkes took steps to help protect the environment after World War II. At the United Nations Scientific Conference on the Conservation and Utilization of Resources, held between August 17 through September 6, 1949, Telkes presented a paper and spoke on the importance and future of solar energy as an alternative energy source, providing examples of solar heating in houses. Telkes said "Solar energy is our greatest untapped energy resource and future development in its utilization should be regarded as one of the most important and fruitful projects.”

Telkes's outstanding contributions were acknowledged through numerous accolades, including the prestigious Society of Women Engineers Achievement Award and the Charles Greely Abbot Award from the International Solar Energy Society. Later in her career, at the age of 77, Telkes received a lifetime achievement award from the National Academy of Sciences and the National Research Council, also an award from Building Research Advisory Board.
