= Benjamin Caryl House =

Historic house in Massachusetts, United States

- U.S. National Register of Historic Places
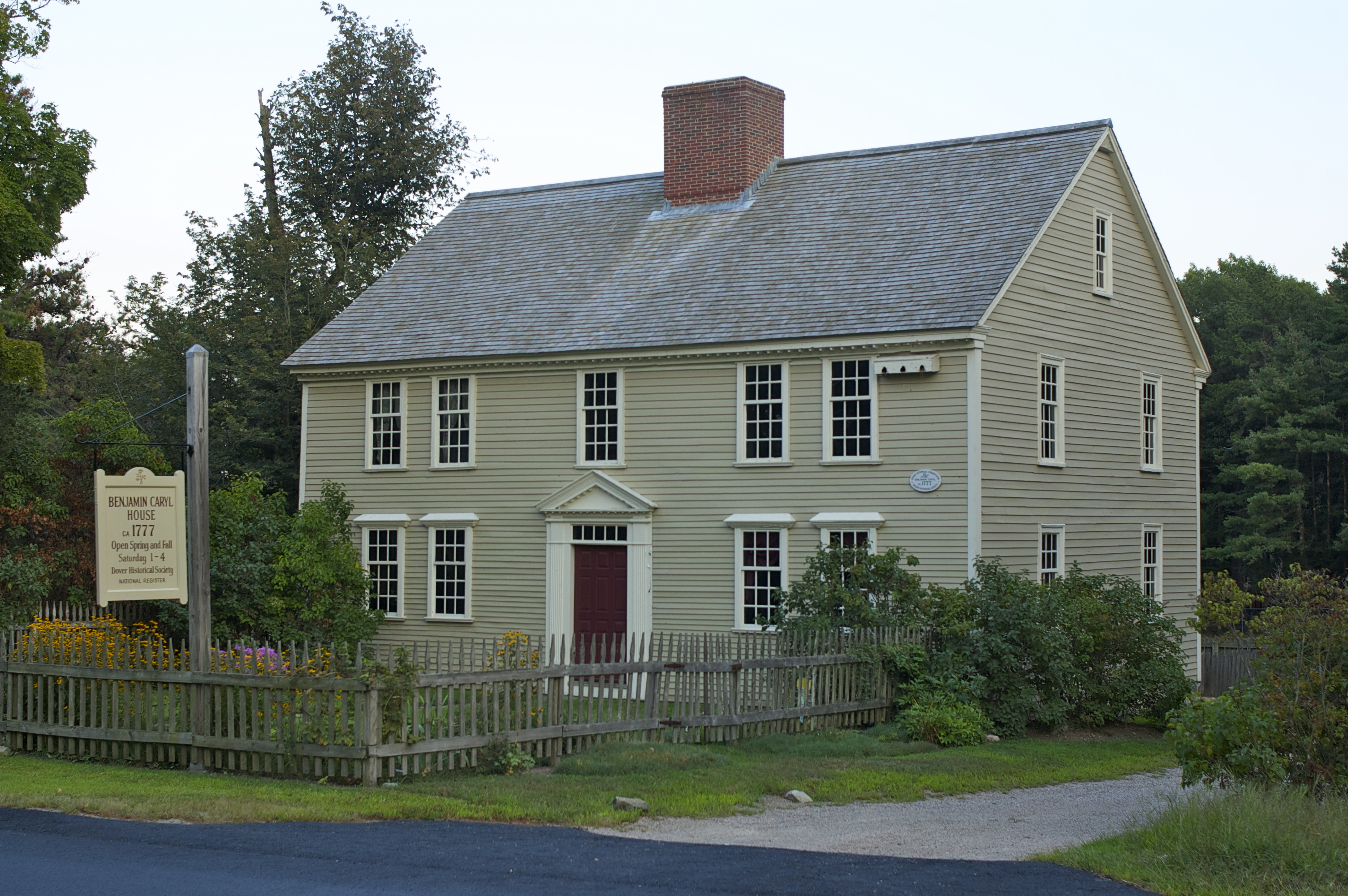

- Location within Massachusetts Location within the United States
- Location: Dover, Massachusetts
- Coordinates: 42°14′53″N 71°16′17″W
- Built: 1777
- Architectural style: Colonial
- NRHP reference No.: 00000569
- Added to NRHP: June 2, 2000

Benjamin Caryl House is a historic house museum located in Caryl Park at 107 Dedham Street in Dover, Massachusetts.

The Reverend Benjamin Caryl was the first minister of Springfield Parish, then in a part of Dedham which is now Dover. He built the house around the year 1777. Benjamin's son George, who was the town's first doctor, and their descendants occupied the house until 1897. Since 1920 the building has been owned and operated by the Dover Historical Society. The house retains its architectural integrity and has been carefully restored with period furnishings to reflect life in the 1790s when the first two Caryl families lived and worked there together. It is currently operated as a historic house museum by the Historical Society.

The house was added to the National Register of Historic Places in 2000.

== See also ==
- National Register of Historic Places listings in Norfolk County, Massachusetts
