= House Beautiful =

American interior decorating magazine

- September 2009 cover of House Beautiful
- Editor: Joanna Saltz
- Frequency: 10 per year
- Total circulation (June 2012): 835,005
- Founded: 1896
- Company: Hearst Magazines
- Country: United States
- Based in: New York City
- Language: English
- Website: www.housebeautiful.com
- ISSN: 0018-6422

House Beautiful is an interior decorating magazine that focuses on decorating and the domestic arts. First published in 1896, it is currently published by the Hearst Corporation, who began publishing it in 1934. It is the oldest still-published magazine in what is known as the "shelter magazine" genre.

The magazine was launched in the United Kingdom in the early 1950s, positioned for young 'home-makers.' It is still sold in the UK, where it has a circulation of 93,992.

== Editors ==
- Eugene Klapp and Henry B. Harvey (1896–1897)
- Eugene Klapp (1897–1898)
- Herbert S. Stone (1898–1913)
- Virginia Huntington Robie (1913–1915)
- Mabel Kent (1915–1916)
- Grace Atkinson Kimball (1916–1918)
- Mabel Rollins (1918–1920)
- Charlotte Lewis (1921)
- Ellery Sedgwick (1922)
- Ethel B. Power (1923–1934)
- Arthur H. Samuels (1934–1936)
- Kenneth K. Stowell (1936–1941)
- Elizabeth Gordon (1941–1964)
- Sarah Tomerlin Lee (1965–1969)
- Wallace Guenther (1969–1977)
- Doris Shaw (1977–1978)
- JoAnn Barwick (1978–1991)
- Louis Oliver Gropp (1991–2000)
- Marian McEvoy (2000–2002)
- Mark Mayfield (2002–2005)
- Stephen Drucker (2005–2010)
- Newell Turner (2010–2015)
- Sophie Donelson (2015–2018)
- Joanna Saltz (2018–present)
