= Dover, Massachusetts =

- Town
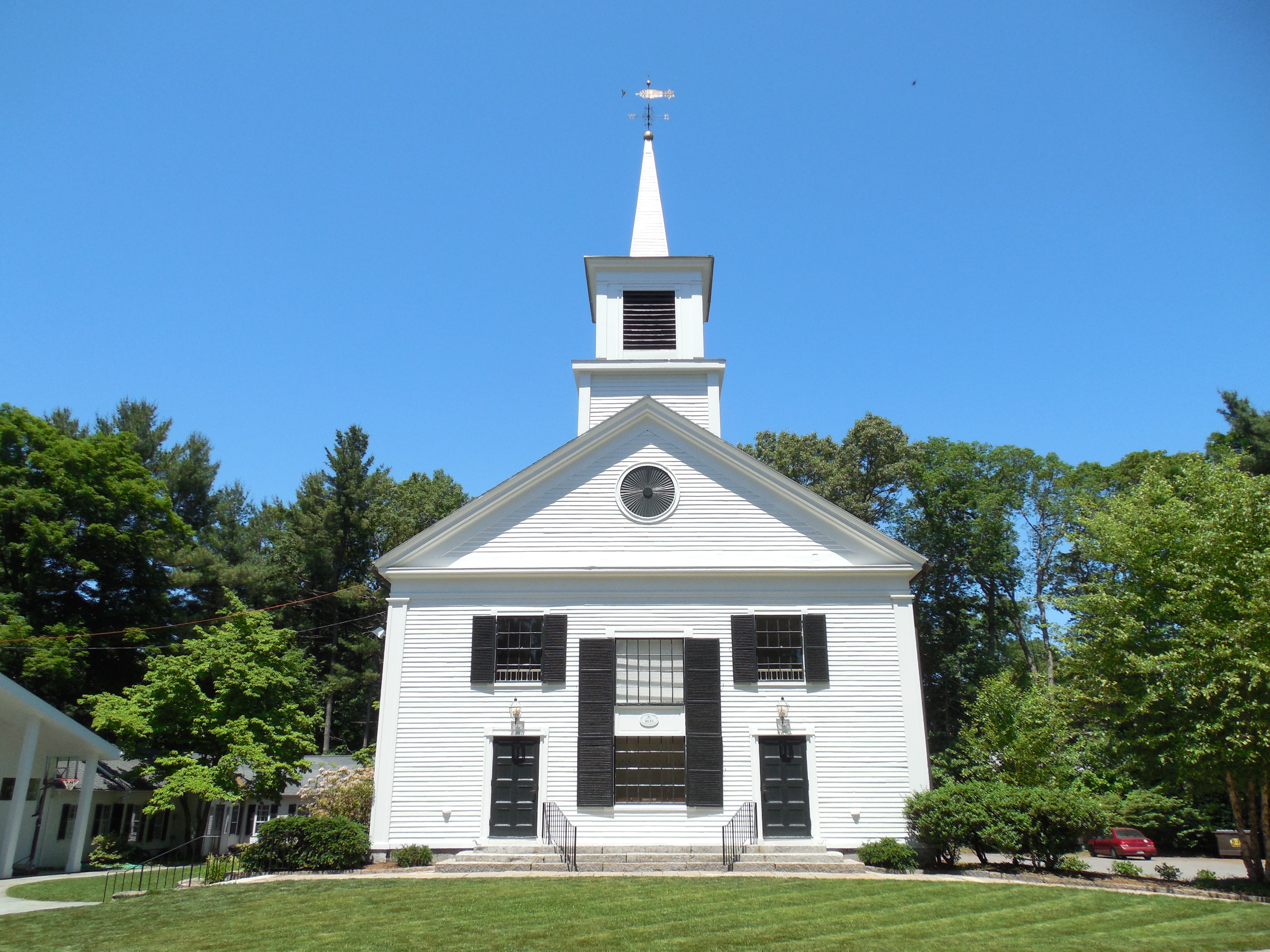
- The Dover Church

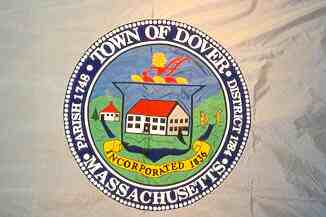
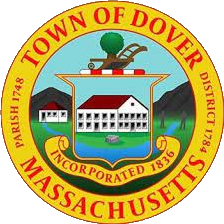
- Flag Seal

- Location in Norfolk County, Massachusetts
- Coordinates: 42°14′45″N 71°17′00″W
- Country: United States
- State: Massachusetts
- County: Norfolk
- Settled: 1635
- Incorporated: 1836

Government
  - Type: Open town meeting
  - Town Administrator: Michael Blanchard

Area
  - Total: 15.4 sq mi (39.9 km^{2})
  - Land: 15.3 sq mi (39.7 km^{2})
  - Water: 0.077 sq mi (0.2 km^{2})
- Elevation: 151 ft (46 m)

Population (2020)
  - Total: 5,923
  - Density: 386/sq mi (149/km^{2})
- Time zone: UTC−5 (Eastern)
  - Summer (DST): UTC−4 (Eastern)
- ZIP code: 02030
- Area code: 617 / 774
- FIPS code: 25-17405
- GNIS feature ID: 0618319
- Website: www.doverma.gov

Dover is a town in Norfolk County, Massachusetts, United States. The population was 5,923 at the time of the 2020 United States Census.

Located about 15 miles (24 km) southwest of downtown Boston, Dover is a residential town nestled on the south banks of the Charles River. Almost all of the residential zoning requires 1 acre (4,000 m^{2}) or larger. As recently as the early 1960s, 75% of its annual town budget was allocated to snow removal, as only one and a half miles (2.4 km) of the town's roads are state highway.

Dover is bordered by Natick, Wellesley and Needham to the north, Westwood to the east, Walpole and Medfield to the south, and Sherborn to the west.

For geographic and demographic information on the census-designated place Dover, please see the article Dover (CDP), Massachusetts.

== History ==
The first recorded settlement of Dover was in 1640. It was later established as the Springfield Parish of Dedham in 1748, and incorporated as District Dedham in 1784. Dover was officially incorporated as a town in 1836.

The Benjamin Caryl House, at 107 Dedham St., dates from about 1777 and was the home of Dover's first minister, Benjamin Caryl, his son George, who was the town's first doctor, and their descendants until 1897. It has been owned by the town and operated by the Historical Society since 1920. The house retains its architectural integrity and has been carefully restored to reflect life in the 1790s when the first two Caryl families lived and worked there together.

The Sawin Building has housed thousands of Dover relics, books, photographs and artifacts since the beginning of the 20th century. Benjamin and Eudora Sawin willed land and funds into the Dover Historical Society along with their old household goods so that the building could be erected, and it was dedicated on May 14, 1907, by members and friends of the society. In the early years, it was used for meetings and to house Dover's historical memorabilia, but eventually members became disenchanted with the society and the building was seldom opened. In the 1960s, there was a renewed interest which led to the general overhaul and refurbishing of the building. The Sawin Museum, located at the corner of Centre and Dedham Streets in Dover Center, is owned and operated by the Dover Historical Society and is open to the public free of charge.

== Geography ==
According to the United States Census Bureau, the town has a total area of 15.4 square miles (39.9 km^{2}), of which 15.3 square miles (39.7 km^{2}) is land and 0.1 square miles (0.2 km^{2}) (0.52%) is water. It is bordered by the towns of Natick, Wellesley, Needham, Westwood, Walpole, Medfield and Sherborn.

== Demographics ==
Historical population
Year	Pop.	±%
1790	485	—
1850	631	+30.1%
1860	679	+7.6%
1870	645	−5.0%
1880	653	+1.2%
1890	727	+11.3%
1900	656	−9.8%
1910	798	+21.6%
1920	867	+8.6%
1930	1,195	+37.8%
1940	1,374	+15.0%
1950	1,722	+25.3%
1960	2,846	+65.3%
1970	4,529	+59.1%
1980	4,703	+3.8%
1990	4,915	+4.5%
2000	5,558	+13.1%
2010	5,589	+0.6%
2020	5,923	+6.0%
2022*	5,860	−1.1%
* = population estimate. Source: United States census records and Population Estimates Program data.

At the 2000 census, there were 5,558 people, 1,849 households and 1,567 families residing in the town. The population density was 362.6 inhabitants per square mile (140.0/km^{2}). There were 1,884 housing units at an average density of 122.9 per square mile (47.5/km^{2}). The racial makeup was 95.18% White, 0.41% Black or African American, 0.04% Native American (2 people), 3.63% Asian, 0.02% Pacific Islander, 0.05% from other races, and 0.67% from two or more races. Hispanic or Latino residents of any race were 1.19% of the population (approximately 105 people).

There were 1,849 households, of which 46.0% had children under the age of 18 living with them, 77.0% were married couples living together, 5.5% had a female householder with no husband present, and 15.2% were non-families. 12.8% of all households were made up of individuals, and 5.9% had someone living alone who was 65 years of age or older. The average household size was 3.01 and the average family size was 3.29.

31.6% of the population were under the age of 18, 3.7% from 18 to 24, 23.9% from 25 to 44, 29.6% from 45 to 64, and 11.2% who were 65 years of age or older. The median age was 40 years. For every 100 females, there were 95.2 males. For every 100 females age 18 and over, there were 92.8 males.

The median household income was $141,818 and the median family income was $157,168. Males had a median income of $100,000 and females $56,473. The per capita income was $64,899. About 2.3% of families and 3.0% of the population were below the poverty line, including 2.5% of those under age 18 and 7.1% of those age 65 or over.

== Arts and culture ==
Historic sites include:

- Benjamin Caryl House (1777)
- Elm Bank Horticulture Center (1876)
- Dover Sun House, one of the world's first solar-heated houses, designed in 1948 by architect Eleanor Raymond and with a heating system developed by physicist Mária Telkes. The project was funded by philanthropist and sculptor Amelia Peabody, and built on her property in Dover, Massachusetts. Dover Sun House was demolished in 2010.

== Government ==
Historically, Dover was one of the few communities in metropolitan Boston to have more registered Republicans than Democrats, with the most recent Republican nominee winning the town being former Massachusetts governor, Mitt Romney in 2012, defeating Barack Obama 56% to 43%. However, as of 2021 the town had more registered Democrats than Republicans. In 2016, the town flipped, with Democrat Hillary Clinton defeating Republican Donald Trump by 57% to 32%. In 2020, Joe Biden improved Clinton's margin by 16 points, winning it 69% to 28%.

Presidential election results

Dover town vote by Party in presidential elections
Year	Democratic	Republican	Third Parties
2024	65.42% 2439	29.96% 1117	4.61% 172
2020	68.65% 2759	28.37% 1140	2.99% 120
2016	57.21% 2063	31.53% 1137	11.26% 406
2012	42.80% 1534	55.92% 2004	1.28% 46
2008	51.03% 1741	47.30% 1614	1.67% 57
2004	47.87% 1605	50.34% 1688	1.79% 60
2000	37.27% 1217	54.12% 1767	8.61% 281
1996	37.54% 1172	54.96% 1716	7.5% 234
1992	31.83% 1008	49.92% 1581	18.25% 578
1988	30.80% 956	68.00% 2111	1.20% 37
1984	27.91% 827	71.72% 2125	0.37% 11
1980	18.36% 523	63.52% 1809	18.12% 516
1976	25.15% 692	72.20% 1987	2.65% 73
1972	30.03% 778	69.55% 1802	0.42% 11
1968	31.69% 707	66.20% 1477	1.84% 47
1964	44.68% 807	54.65% 987	0.67% 12
1960	24.05% 403	75.66% 1268	0.29% 5
1956	13.29% 178	86.56% 1159	0.15% 2
1952	13.27% 134	86.63% 875	0.1% 1
1948	17.81% 145	81.20% 661	0.98% 8
1944	23.08% 186	76.67% 618	0.25% 2
1940	25.20% 190	74.54% 562	0.26% 2
1936	23.45% 155	72.47% 479	4.08% 27
1932	25.51% 126	73.08% 361	1.41% 7
1928	29.54% 148	69.26% 347	1.20% 6
1924	17.28% 61	76.77% 271	5.95% 21
1920	19.76% 65	78.42% 258	1.82% 6
1916	32.20% 57	65.54% 116	2.26% 4
1912	30.88% 42	44.12% 60	25.00% 34
1908	16.83% 17	76.24% 77	6.93% 7
1904	26.88% 25	67.74% 63	5.38% 5
1900	25.25% 25	68.69% 68	6.06% 6
1896	15.15% 15	81.82% 81	3.03% 3
1892	46.32% 63	47.06% 64	6.62% 9
1888	34.15% 42	56.91% 70	8.94% 11
1884	39.81% 41	49.51% 51	10.68% 11
1880	34.51% 39	65.49% 74	0.00% 0
1876	41.76% 38	58.24% 53	0.00% 0
1872	27.27% 27	72.73% 72	0.00% 0
1868	21.05% 24	78.95% 90	0.00% 0

== Education ==
Dover's public schools are considered among the best in Massachusetts. According to research conducted by Boston magazine in 2013, 2014, 2015, 2016, 2017, 2018 and 2019, the town's schools scored No. 1 in the state. Dover has three public schools: Chickering Elementary School (grades K–5), Dover-Sherborn Middle School (grades 6–8) and Dover-Sherborn High School (grades 9–12). The private, independent Charles River School (grades Pre-K–8) is located in the town's center.

Located near Caryl Park and the entrance to Noanet Woodlands (also known as Miss Peabody's Woods), Chickering School is under the elected Dover School Committee, while the two secondary schools are the responsibility of the regional school system, under the elected Dover-Sherborn Regional School Committee, with costs and governance shared with the neighboring town of Sherborn. The regional schools share a campus on Farm Street in Dover, near the borders with Sherborn and Medfield.

Dover-Sherborn High School has impressive results with regards to graduation rates, college admission rates and standardized and Advanced Placement exam scores. DSHS was ranked third in cost efficiency and seventh in academic performance by Boston magazine. U.S. News & World Report named Dover-Sherborn a Gold Medal School, ranking it 65th in the US.

Dover used to have two elementary schools, Chickering for grades K to 3, and Caryl Elementary School for grades 4 to 6. In 1970, Caryl School was gutted by fire. It was rebuilt and remained open until finally being closed in 2001 after the expansion of Chickering. The Caryl School's building has now been renovated into a community center.

== Notable people ==
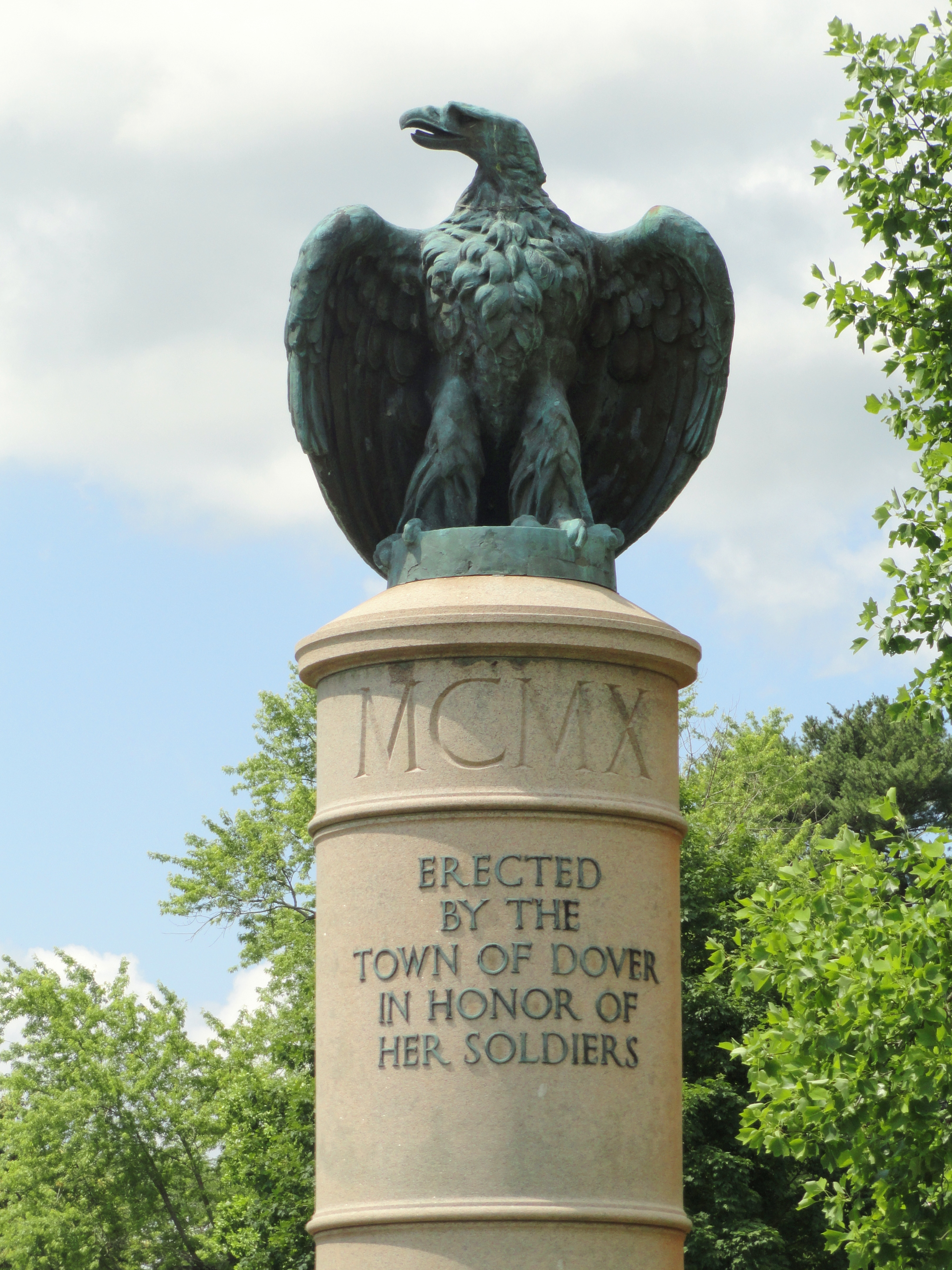
Soldiers' monument, first dedicated on June 18, 1910

- Ian Bowles, environmentalist, businessman, politician, and former Massachusetts Secretary of Energy and Environmental Affairs
- Katherine Doherty, child actress
- Joseph F. Enright, submarine captain in the United States Navy, commanded the USS Archer-Fish and sank the Japanese aircraft carrier Shinano
- Kenny Florian, UFC fighter, Fox/UFC analyst
- Carl J. Gilbert, United States trade representative from 1969 to 1971
- Adam Granofsky (stage name Adam Granduciel), American guitarist, singer, songwriter and record producer, lead singer of the band The War on Drugs
- Jeffrey Harrison, poet
- Mark Hollingsworth, Bishop of the Episcopal Diocese of Ohio
- Brian Hoyer, Quarterback of the New England Patriots
- Bob Lobel, local news sportscaster
- Don MacTavish, stock car driver and winner of the 1966 NASCAR Sportsman Series Championship
- Melinda McGraw, actress
- Dorothy Morkis, Olympic medal-winning equestrian
- Chris Murray, minor league ice hockey player
- George O'Day, Olympic gold medal-winning sailor, 2-time winner of the America's Cup, Sailing Hall of Fame, founder of O'Day Boats
- Bohdan Pomahač, plastic surgeon who led the team that performed the first full face transplant in the United States
- Matthew A. Reynolds, Assistant Secretary of State for Legislative Affairs
- Leverett Saltonstall, U.S. Senator
- George P. Sanger, lawyer, editor, judge, and businessman
- Francis W. Sargent, Governor
- Brian Scalabrine, former NBA player and broadcaster
- Milt Schmidt, former player, coach and general manager of the Boston Bruins, member of the Hockey Hall of Fame
- Ronald B. Scott, journalist, biographer of W. Mitt Romney, and author of the novel Closing Circles: Trapped in the Everlasting Mormon Moment
- Jeff Serowik, former Boston Bruins player
- John Smith, American football placekicker
- Karen Stives, Olympic medal-winning equestrian
- Dominique Wilkins, former professional basketball player and NBA Hall of Famer

== In popular culture ==
Dover is known for the Dover Demon, a creature supposedly sighted in three separate incidents on April 21 and 22, 1977.
