= Hyde Park High School (Massachusetts) =

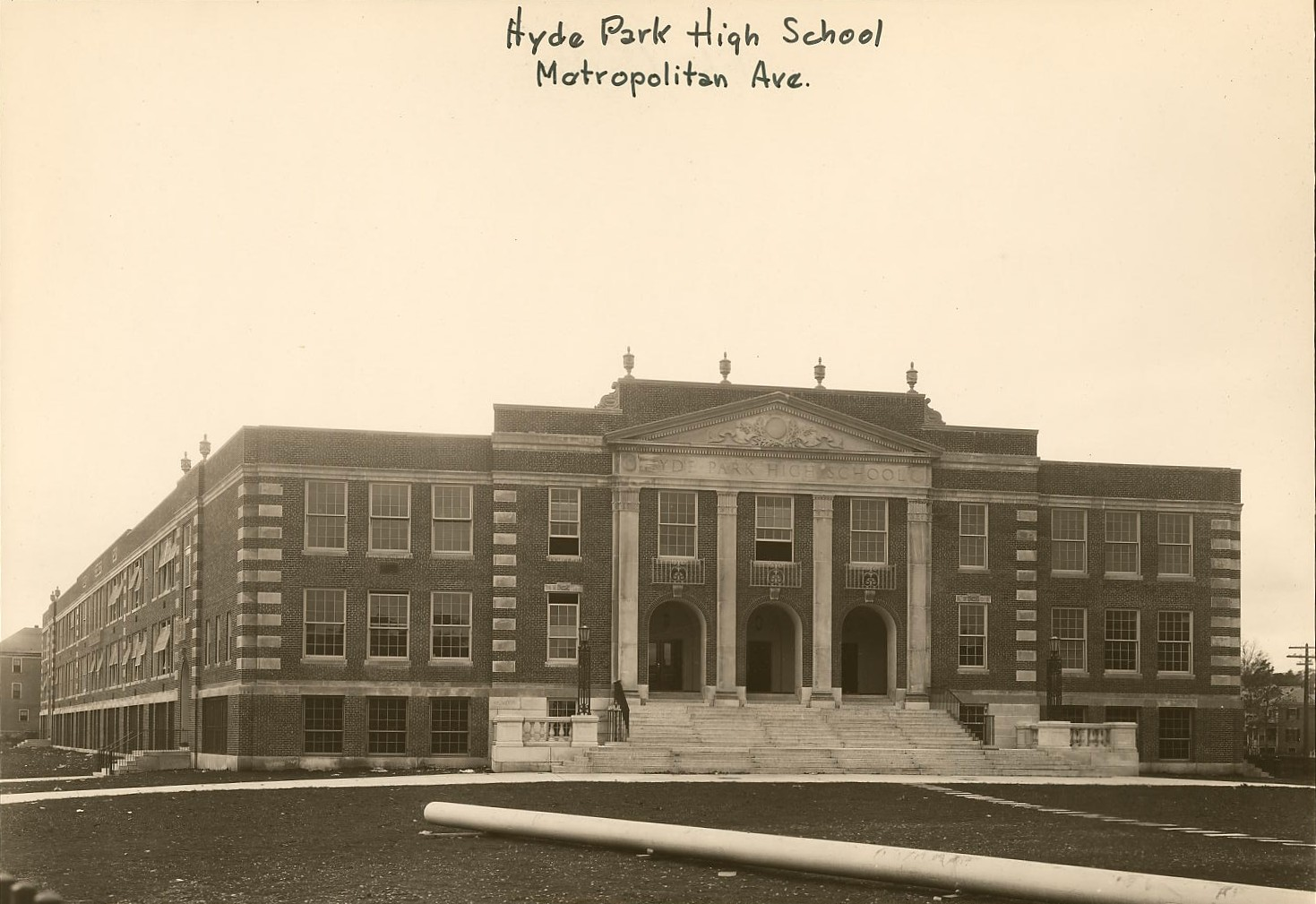
- External view of the high school, circa 1928

Location
- 655 Metropolitan Avenue; Hyde Park, Massachusetts 02136; United States; 42.2627°N 71.1178°W

Information
- Type: Public high school
- Established: 1869
- Closed: 2005
- Faculty: 73 (1965)
- Enrollment: 1,700 (1967)
- Color: Blue White
- Team name: Blue Stars
- Yearbook: The Blue Book

Hyde Park High School was a four-year public high school that served students in ninth through twelfth grades in the Boston neighborhood of Hyde Park, Massachusetts, United States. The school held its first classes in 1869, one year after the founding of the town of Hyde Park. The school was located at 655 Metropolitan Avenue from 1928 until its closure in 2005.

== History ==
=== Founding and development ===
Hyde Park High School was established in 1869, in what was then the independent town of Hyde Park, Massachusetts. In its early years, the school offered two courses of study for pupils, a four year classical preparatory education, and a two year business training course. Hyde Park was annexed by the City of Boston in 1912, and the administration of Hyde Park High School was assumed by Boston Public Schools (BPS). Male and female pupils were taught separately until senior year, at which time the studies became co-educational. Into the 1960s, the school was a popular choice for parents and students, even for those outside of the neighborhood, evidenced by the population increase at the school from 1,236 pupils enrolled in 1960 to 1,700 students in 1967. The headmaster reported a waiting list of 250 at that time.

=== Challenging times ===
Racial tensions began to haunt the school, starting in 1970. The African American population at the school in the early 1970s stood at 15%. On January 19, 1970, a dispute between groups of black and white youths at a bus stop resulted in a knifing incident, with two white pupils being slashed, and a black student arrested for assault. Faculty arriving on January 21 to school found that anti–black graffiti had been spray–painted on the front steps of the building. Half of the 1700 student population was absent following the incident.

Starting in the fall of 1974, court ordered desegregation was implemented, more than doubling the population of black students. On September 19, racial violence cut classes short. Rocks were thrown at departing school buses. On October 15, a 15-year-old white student was stabbed during a melee in the school's main corridor, and at least six other students and one teacher went to the hospital. Students recall being locked in their classrooms. An 18-year-old black youth from Dorchester was ultimately arrested in the stabbing.

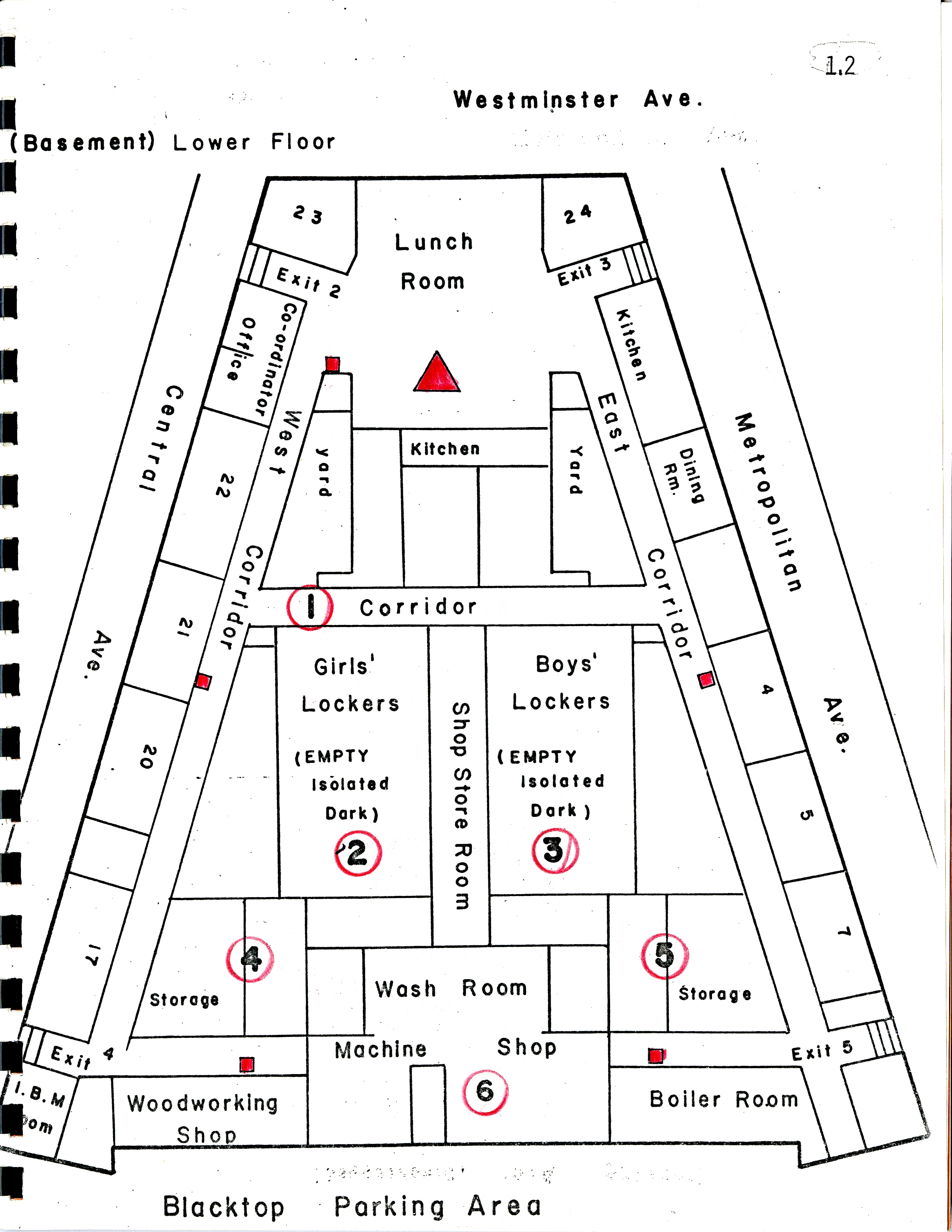
Partial Boston Police Department plan of Hyde Park High School, created to assist assigned officers. Note the "isolated, dark" description of locker room areas

On account of the many occurrences of violence in the school and immediate area, the Boston Police Department’s Tactical Police Force were deployed to the neighborhood. Governor Francis Sargent summoned 450 members of the National Guard, over the objection of Mayor Kevin White. Sargent also made a request to President Gerald Ford to send federal troops to Boston to quell racial violence in the city, which was denied. BPS installed a magnetometer, borrowed from United Airlines, to scan all students coming into school.

=== Later years ===
Court ordered busing and the ensuing racial strife left a lasting impact on the school. Once described as a "country club" by its headmaster, by the 1980s and continuing into the 90s, the school was fraught with claims of racism, violence among students, a consistent underperformer threatened with loss of accreditation, and a frequent target for closure.

Another Course to College was temporarily relocated and held classes in the basement of Hyde Park High School from 1989 until 1993.

=== Closure and structure change ===
Hyde Park High School ceased to exist following the 2004–05 school year. BPS Superintendent Thomas Payzant implemented a plan to create smaller schools within the Hyde Park High School and other neighborhood schools with the hope to improve education and attendance, prevent dropping out, and to give top students more rigorous assignments. The facility was renamed the Hyde Park Education Complex, and smaller autonomous schools and academic programs were created, each with a focused theme. The following are a list of schools and programs housed in the building since Hyde Park High School's closing.

Beginning in the 2005–2006 school year, the following schools opened in the facility:

- Community Academy of Science & Health
- The Engineering School
- Social Justice Academy

At the end of the 2010–2011 school year, The Engineering School and the Social Justice Academy were closed. The Community Academy of Science & Health was relocated to Dorchester, leaving the building empty for the first time in 82 years.

Starting in the 2012–2013 school year, the following schools were moved into the building:

- Boston Community Leadership Academy
- New Mission High School

Starting in the 2020-2021 school year, The Building will be home to one school, New Mission High School. This is the first time the building occupied one school since 2005.

== In media ==
In his television series Free to Choose, economist Milton Friedman used the school as an example of the failure of the public school system; highlighting the schools use of metal detectors, uniformed police and the state of the facilities.

== Locations ==
The school was housed in several locations from its opening until 1902 when the selectmen dedicated a four-floor school building located at Everett Street and Harvard Avenue. Hyde Park High remained at the location until it was decided that a new, larger building was needed to house the school's growing population. Officials decided on a triangular site between Metropolitan Avenue and Harvard Avenue, the two-story, $1,286,000 building being completed in 1928. The prior 1902 building then became the William Barton Rogers Middle School (since closed).

- (1869–1870) 85 Williams Avenue (Fairmount School)
- (1870–1871) 1207 River Street (Liberty Hall)
- (1871–1874/1901–1902) Henry Grew School
- (1874–1901) Everett School
- (1902–1928) 15 Everett Street
- (1928–2006) 655 Metropolitan Avenue

The current Hyde Park Educational Complex is accessible by taking the MBTA bus 32 from nearby Forest Hills.

== Notable alumni ==
- William Monroe Trotter — newspaper editor, real estate businessman and civil rights leader. Founder of African American newspaper the Boston Guardian
- Robert Frederick Drinan — Roman Catholic Jesuit priest, lawyer, human rights activist, dean of Boston College Law School and Democratic U.S. Representative from Massachusetts
- Russell Holmes — Massachusetts State Representative
- Charles Wilson Killam — professor of architectural construction at Harvard University, attended Hyde Park High School from 1885–1887 but did not graduate
- Russ Lee — basketball player, sixth overall pick of 1972 NBA draft and Kevin Florio, football player, who went on to star as a running back at St.Mary's University in Halifax, Nova Scotia.
- Paul Nevins — class of 1962, teacher, civil rights lawyer, author of The Politics of Selfishness.

== Headmasters ==
A total of nineteen educators served as headmaster of the school:

- George M. Fellows (1869–1870)
- Samuel E. Thurber (1870–1872)
- Frank W. Freeborn (1872–1875)
- W. H. Knight (1875–1876)
- John F. Elliot (1876–1889)
- Jeremiah M. Hill (1889–1896)
- William H. Angleton (1896–1899)
- Merle S. Getchell (1899–1906)
- I. Arthur Lee (1906–1909)
- George W. Earle (1909–1934)
- Dennis C. Haley (1934–1940)
- Henry W. Arnold (Acting) (1941)
- Francis J. Horgan (1941–1959)
- Charles J. Keelon (1959–1966)
- David E. Rosengard (1966–1970)
- John F. Best (1970–1976)
- Michael A. Donato (1976–1989)
- Curtis D. Wells (1989–1996)
- A. Ray Peterson (1996–2000)
- Linda Cabral (2000–2005)

== See also ==
Boston Public Schools
Hyde Park, Boston
