= Billerica and Bedford Railroad =

Early narrow gauge line in Massachusetts, US

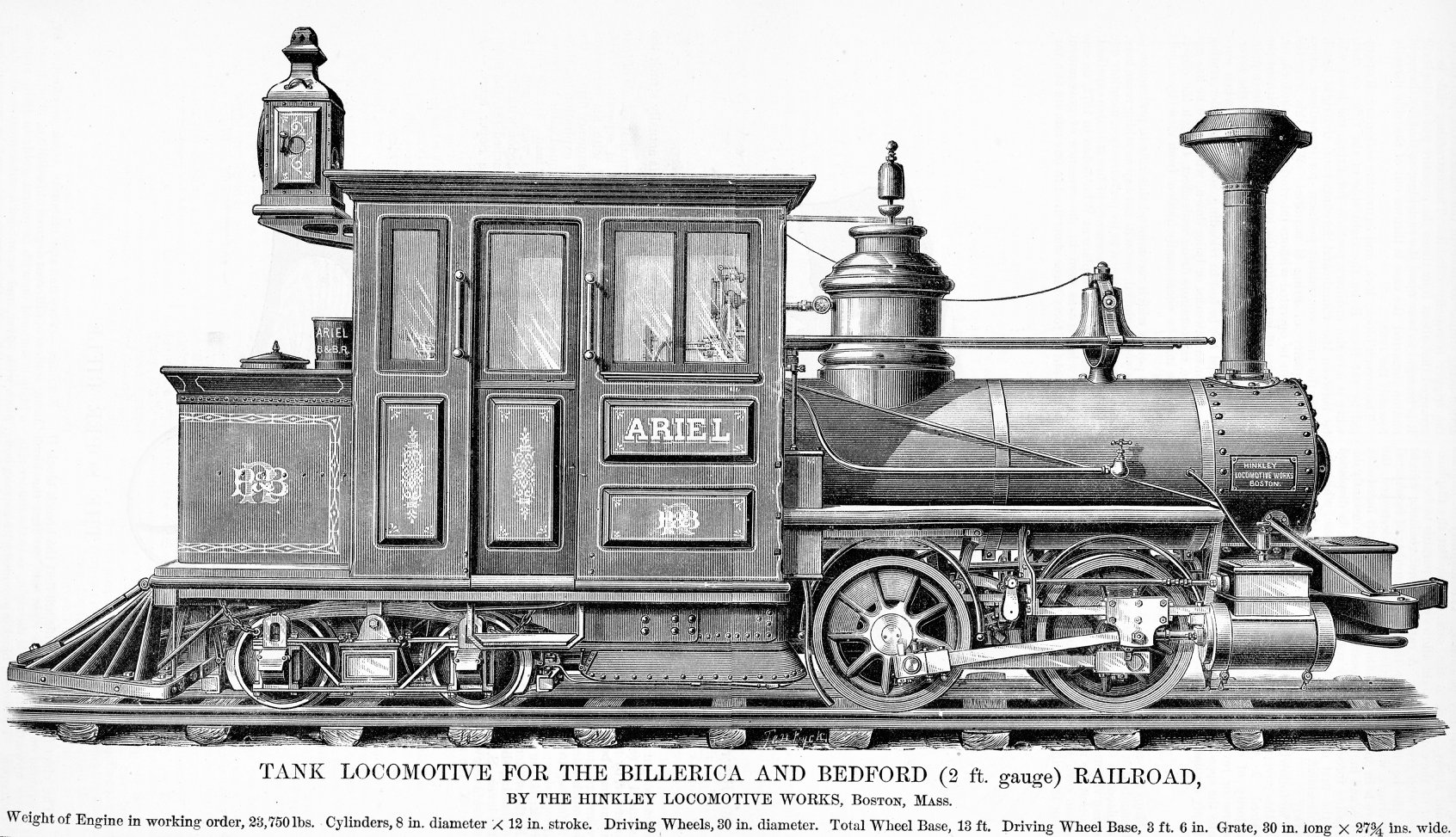
- Steam locomotive 'Ariel' built by Hinkley Locomotive Works of Boston

Overview
- Locale: Massachusetts
- Dates of operation: 1877–1878
- Successor: Abandoned

Technical
- Track gauge: 2 ft (610 mm)
Route map
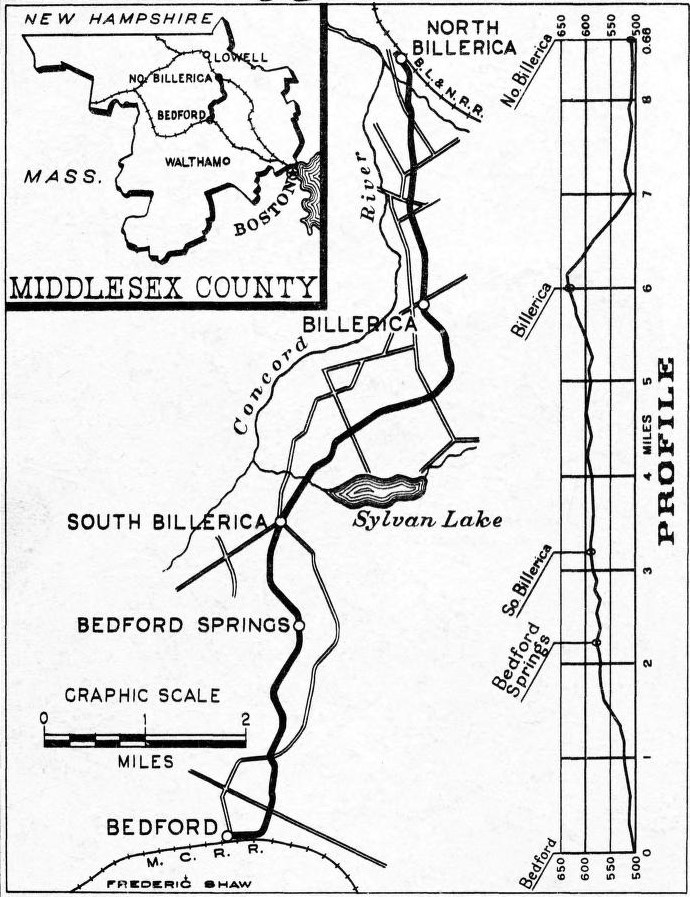
Route of the Billerica and Bedford Railroad
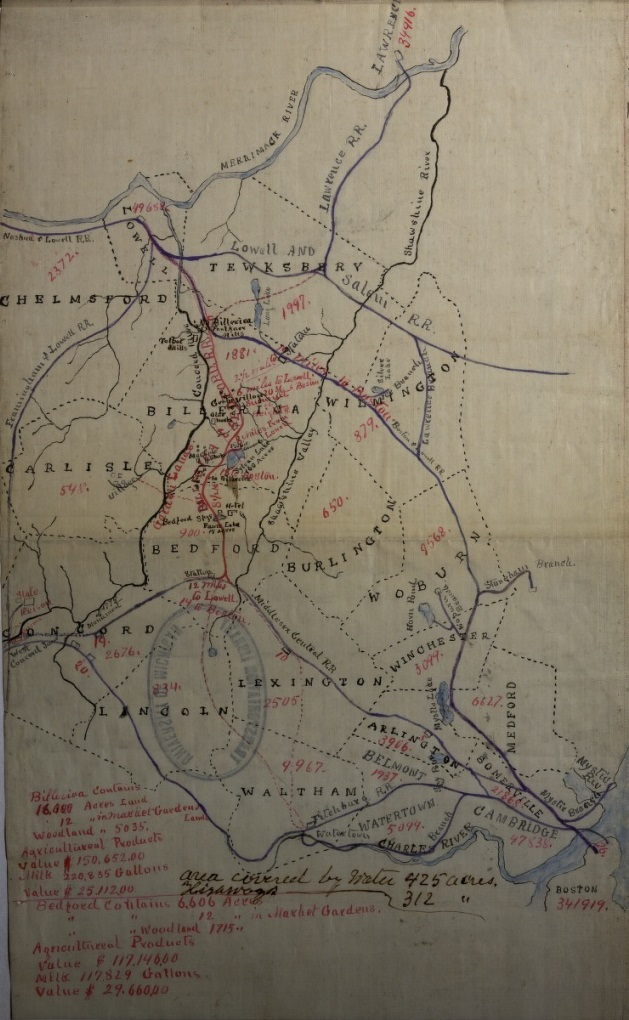
Original drawing of the route

The Billerica and Bedford Railroad was an early narrow gauge railroad in Massachusetts, built to demonstrate the advantages of a 2 ft (610 mm) gauge railroad.

== History ==
George E. Mansfield, of Hazelwood, Massachusetts, allegedly became an early promoter of the two foot gauge after seeing the Ffestiniog Railway in operation in Wales. This has been a popular idea but Mansfield never made the claim of visiting Wales in any of his numerous writings. In an article in the October 24, 1875 Boston Herald, George explained how his idea of a small-gauge railroad was developed based on the needs of small towns followed the railroad depression of that year. He persuaded the citizens of Billerica of the economies of a two-foot line, and became general manager of the Billerica and Bedford when it was chartered in 1876. Construction began in May 1877, and the line was completed between North Billerica and Bedford in August 1877, a distance of 8.63 miles (13.89 km).

The line was built very cheaply in accordance with narrow gauge doctrine, but rapidly found itself financially embarrassed. Turntables were built at each end of the railroad, and a wye and engine-house were built at Bedford, but no stations were ever constructed along the line. The company went bankrupt and was liquidated in June 1878.

Mansfield, undeterred, went on to promote the two foot gauge in Maine, where the largest network of these lines in the United States was ultimately built. The standard-gauge Boston and Lowell Railroad used most of the B&B roadbed to extend its Lexington Branch in May 1885. The Boston and Maine Railroad took over the line in 1887.

Station stops on the line along were Bedford, Springs Road, Bedford Springs, South Billerica, Turnpike (Nuttings Lake), Billerica, Bennett Hall and North Billerica. (Only the Bedford and North Billerica station depot structures still stand.) Passenger service stopped on the last day of 1931 and the line was used as a freight line until it was abandoned from Bedford Depot to Billerica Depot in 1962. The line was further abandoned from Billerica Depot to Bennett Hall about 1980.

The two locomotives were named after William Shakespeare's sprites, Ariel and Puck.

== Rolling stock ==
Name	Photo	Builder	Type	Date	Works number	Notes
Ariel		Hinkley Locomotive Works	0-4-4RT Forney locomotive	1877	1251	Became Sandy River Railroad #1
Puck		Hinkley Locomotive Works	0-4-4RT Forney locomotive	1877	1261	Became Sandy River Railroad #2
Fawn		Ranlet Manufacturing Company	combine car	1877		Became Sandy River Railroad #4
Sylvan		Ranlet Manufacturing Company	coach	1877		Became Sandy River Railroad #3
A		Ranlet Manufacturing Company	boxcar	1877		Became Sandy River Railroad #2
B & C		Ranlet Manufacturing Company	excursion cars	1877		Rebuilt as Sandy River Railroad baggage cars #1 & #3
D thru I		Ranlet Manufacturing Company	flatcars	1877		Sold to Sandy River Railroad several later rebuilt as boxcars

== See also ==
- Lexington and West Cambridge Railroad for later history of the right-of-way, including use as a rail trail
- Sandy River Railroad for later history of the rolling stock
- Sumner Heights and Hazelwood Valley Railroad for the experimental railway through George E. Mansfield's backyard
