= Hyde Park, Boston =

Neighborhood of Boston in Suffolk County, Massachusetts, United States

Coordinates: 42°15′20″N 71°07′28″W

Hyde Park
- Neighborhood of Boston
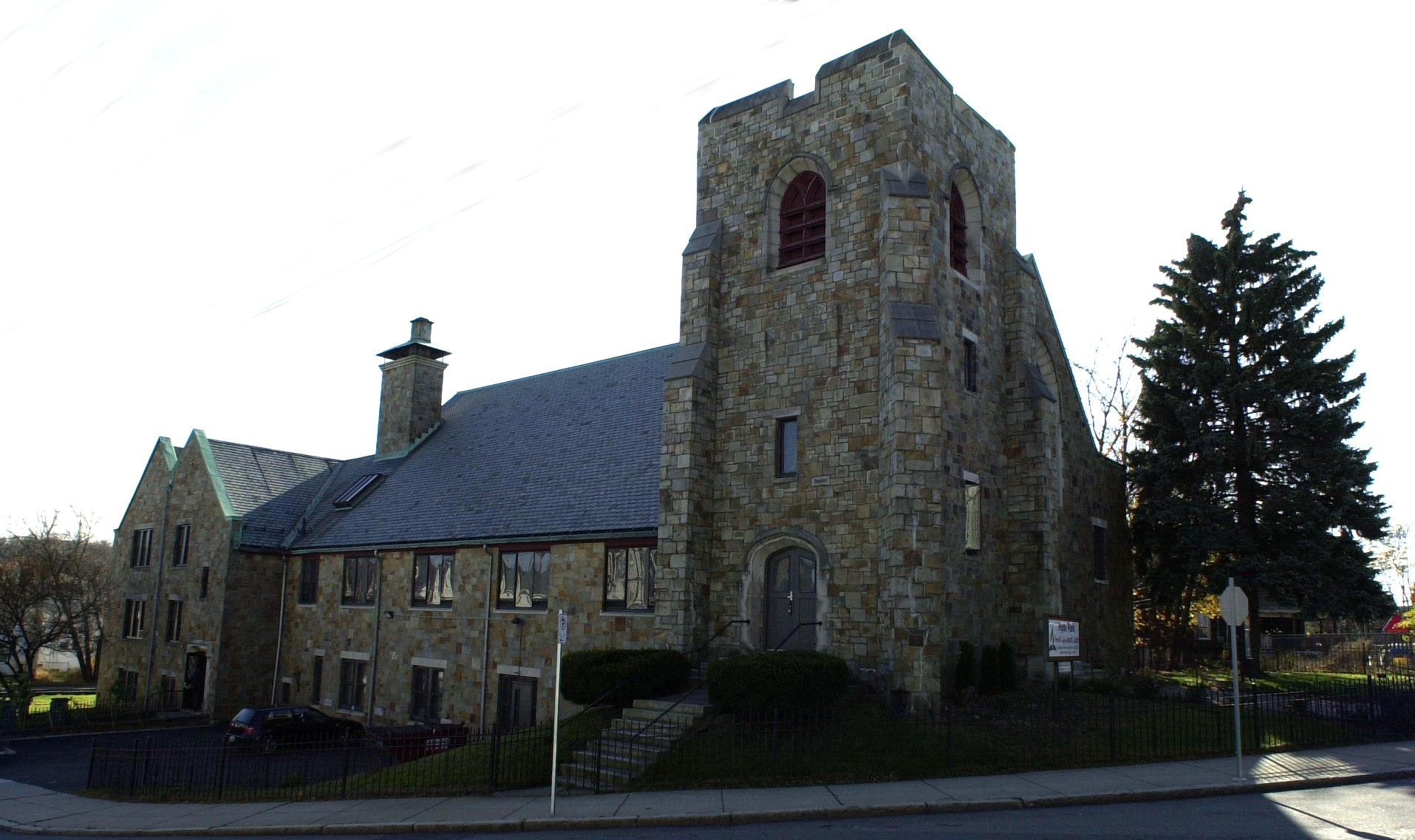
- The First Congregational Church of Hyde Park, now the Hyde Park Seventh-day Adventist Church

- Seal
- Nickname: A Small Town in the City
- Motto: Si Tentas Perfice (Latin) "If you begin, finish"
- Interactive map of Hyde Park
- Country: United States
- State: Massachusetts
- County: Suffolk
- Neighborhood of: Boston
- Incorporated: April 22, 1868
- Annexed by Boston: January 1, 1912
- Time zone: UTC−5 (Eastern)
- ZIP Code: 02136
- Area code: 617/857
- Website: Official website

Hyde Park is the southernmost neighborhood of Boston, Massachusetts, United States. Situated 7.9 miles south of downtown Boston, it is home to a diverse range of people, housing types and social groups. It is an urban location with suburban characteristics.

Hyde Park is covered by Boston Police Department District E-18 located in Cleary Square, and the Boston Fire Department station on Fairmount Avenue is the quarters of Ladder Company 28 & Engine Company 48. Boston EMS Ambulance Station 18 is located on Dana Avenue. Hyde Park also has a branch of the Boston Public Library.

The George Wright Golf Course, named for Baseball Hall of Fame and Boston Red Stockings shortstop George Wright, is in Hyde Park and Roslindale. It is a Donald Ross–designed course and is considered one of his finest designs.

Hyde Park has taken the motto "A Small Town in the City" because of its suburban feel. The area was established in the 1660s and grew into a hub of paper and cotton manufacturing in the eighteenth century. The extension of rail lines from Boston in the 1850s spurred the area's residential development. The Readville section of Hyde Park contained a large manufacturing base housing the massive operations of the B. F. Sturtevant Company and the New York, New Haven & Hartford Railroad Locomotive and Car Shops.

Hyde Park and some of its residents have been an important part of societal change in the United States. It was once home to the first all African-American army unit, the 54th Massachusetts Infantry Regiment. The regiment was made famous in the movie Glory. Hyde Park was home to the prominent abolitionists the Grimké sisters, Sarah and Angelina, as well as Theodore Dwight Weld, for whom Weld Hall in Hyde Park is named.

== Name ==
Hyde Park is named after the park in London, England, which opened to the public in 1637.

== History ==
In 1845, retired businessman Henry Grew took his family on vacation to an area south of Boston, in what was then the western section of Dorchester, and came to a spot in the Neponset River valley with an unexpectedly pleasant view of the nearby Blue Hills. He purchased several hundred acres of land there (which later became known as "Grew's Woods", partially preserved today as the Stony Brook Reservation and the George Wright Golf Course) and moved to the area in 1847. (Grew later served as chairman of the Town of Hyde Park's first board of selectmen and was one of its most prominent citizens.) During the next few years, a group called the Hyde Park Land Company bought about 200 acres of land in the area and began building houses around a small and unofficial passenger stop on the Boston and Providence Railroad that had developed at Kenny's Bridge, located on the road from Dedham to Milton Lower Mills (the road was River Street, and the station today is Hyde Park Station). At that time, the closest actual station was in the manufacturing district of Readville (formerly Low Plains) in Dedham.

Alpheus Perley Blake is considered the founder of Hyde Park. In 1856, he was the organizer of the Fairmount Land Company and the Twenty Associates, which developed the Fairmount Hill on the western side of Brush Hill Road in Milton. This led to the establishment of a bridge over the Neponset River and a new station on the New York and New England Railroad, which is today's Fairmount Station. In addition to Blake, The Twenty Associates included William E. Abbot, Amos Angell, Ira L. Benton, Enoch Blake, John Newton Brown, George W. Currier, Hypolitus Fisk, John C. French, David Higgins, John S. Hobbs, Samuel Salmon Mooney, William Nightingale, J. Wentworth Payson, Dwight B. Rich, Alphonso Robinson, William H. Seavey, Daniel Warren, and John Williams. Within a few years, the two land companies had merged and growth in the area accelerated. By 1867, the settlements had grown to the point where there were 6 railroad stations in the area. A formal petition was made to the General Court of the Commonwealth and, after settling land and boundary disputes with Dedham and Milton, the Town of Hyde Park was incorporated on April 22, 1868, in Norfolk County from the settled land in Dorchester (Grew's Woods and the Hyde Park Land Company development), Milton (Fairmount) and Dedham (Readville). Dedham opposed the taking of its land to create the new town.

It remained a part of Norfolk County until 1912, when the town voted in favor of annexation to the City of Boston in Suffolk County.

The 54th Massachusetts Volunteer Infantry, one of the first official African-American units in the United States Army and which was commanded by Col. Robert G. Shaw and served during the Civil War, was assembled and trained at Camp Meigs in Readville.

In the 1960s, Hyde Park threatened to secede from Boston over plans to build a Southwest Expressway (Interstate 95) through the town along the route of the New York, New Haven and Hartford Railroad, which would bifurcate the neighborhood and displace many residents, as had happened in Roxbury and Jamaica Plain. Hyde Park has also faced other challenges along with its fellow Boston neighborhoods, such as the busing crisis of the 1970s.

Hyde Park has had an active industrial history. For over 100 years, it was the main base of the Westinghouse Sturtevant Corporation. The Readville area was home to the Stop & Shop warehouse, until it was moved to Assonet in the early 2000s.

Hyde Park is home to many churches, most notably the Most Precious Blood, Saint Adalbert's and Saint Anne's Roman Catholic churches, and the Episcopal Parish of Christ Church (the oldest parish in Hyde Park, now Iglesia de San Juan), the latter of which was designed by the architectural form of Cram Wentworth & Goodhue and is listed on the National Register of Historic Places.

Hyde Park is also the original home of the Boston Crusaders, a world class drum and bugle corps founded in 1940 at the Most Precious Blood Parish.

== Community activism ==
Two important Hyde Park residents committed to social change and activism were sisters Sarah Moore Grimké and Angelina Emily Grimké. They played important public roles throughout their lives in ending slavery and promoting women's suffrage.

In the 1970s, desegregation busing of the Boston Public Schools caused an explosion in public activism. Public meetings and protests from concerned parents of affected children continued for years. The issue united Hyde Park with surrounding areas in an attempt to form a new school district for the purpose of avoiding desegregation. Public tension over busing lasted for more than a decade.

Hyde Park is home to a large Haitian community that arrived from the island during the 1980s and on into the 1990s. Immigrants from rural areas of Haiti had limited education beyond early elementary school years. As a result of a Federal lawsuit by parents from Hyde Park and other areas of the city, Boston Public Schools were mandated to provide a comprehensive literacy program. The Haitian Literacy Program has been housed at Hyde Park High School since 1989.

Hyde Park is currently under a major redevelopment effort by the Boston Redevelopment Authority. The Hyde Park Neighborhood Strategic Plan was adopted by BRA. As of yet, the plan has not met notable public resistance. Its aim is to change the zoning regulations in Hyde Park, with an emphasis on public transit and pedestrian use. There is a proposal by non Hyde Park residents to create an urban farm that is receiving public resistance.

== Urban development and policies ==
By the time Hyde Park was incorporated into the City of Boston, B.F. Sturtevant Co had a 20-acre industrial park in the Readville area. It became one of the largest fan manufacturing plants in the world. The plant employed 1,500 people in Hyde Park.

In the early part of the 20th century, Hyde Park hosted harness racing. The site of the track was redeveloped on the former site of Camp Miegs. The Readville Trotting Park was neighbored by the large B.F.Sturtevant plant, thus prompting the installation of a railway station. The track migrated from horses to auto racing, which was the main attraction at the track until its closure in 1937.

In the late 1940s and early 1950s, the Massachusetts Department of Public Works attempted to implement two separate interstate highway expansion projects. Both plans would have created a highway that would have passed through land in Hyde Park. The projects were started but, because of public opposition, were never finished. Interstate 695 and the Southwest Corridor would have run right though Hyde Park, effectively cutting it in half. Hyde Park residents considered seceding from the City of Boston. Residents from Hyde Park and other surrounding communities affected by the proposed project banded together and held a large protest on Boston Common, during what was called "People Before Highways Day". This rally proved to be crucial in having the plan stopped.

Because of the presence of the Stony Brook Reservation, a large part of Hyde Park's interior is effectively off-limits to any new development. The Stony Brook Reservation is a part of the Massachusetts Department of Conservation and Recreation.

In April 2008, the Boston Redevelopment Authority Board, along with Mayor Menino, voted to remap and rezone Hyde Park. Mayor Menino appointed an advisory group of 13 residents to assist the BRA in creating a comprehensive rezoning plan. After two years, with input from city agencies and the community at large, BRA adopted the Hyde Park Neighborhood Strategic Plan. BRA then went on to hire a team of consultants from the urban architecture and design firm of Crosby Schlessinger Smallridge. Articles and a new zoning map were prepared and presented to the Boston Redevelopment Authority Board, which accepted it. The Boston Zoning Commission subsequently agreed to the plan in February 2012.

== Demographics ==
Hyde Park has a significant number of individuals who are foreign-born. Non-citizens make up approximately 10% of the population, consisting primarily of Caribbean-born individuals. 38% of the total population speaks a language other than English. The latest census reports the current demographics breakdown to be as follows: African American 49.49%, Hispanic 19.7%, Non-Hispanic White 33.39%, Other Race 11.34%, Two or More Races 3.46, Asian 1.7%, American Indian or Alaskan Native 0.5%, Native Hawaiian or Other Pacific Islander 0.1%. These two specific demographics, race and nationality, have remained largely unchanged over the last 20 years. A comparison of 2000 and 2010 census shows a 1% difference. The largest age demographic is individuals aged 39–54, who comprise 29% of the population. Hyde Park's elderly population has remained relatively unchanged over the last 20 years, with the count hovering around 4,000, or 6.5% of the total. Hyde Park is home to roughly 7,000 school-aged children and has experienced one of the fastest growth rates in the city in the number of children. 39% of Hyde Park residents are married. Hyde Park's per capita income of appr. $32,224 is roughly average for the US ($33,706). Conversely, the average household income of approximately $89,815 is higher than the US average ($48,150). The poverty rate for Hyde Park, reported as being 10%, is also below the national average (14%). These figures include 586 families.

== Historic architecture ==
Hyde Park's central business district, located between Cleary and Logan Squares, features a variety of historic buildings, including the neighborhood's municipal building, which was built by the City of Boston after the 1912 annexation. The Hyde Park YMCA was built in 1902; a major renovation of the original facility was completed in 2010. The Roman Catholic Most Precious Blood Church, built in the English Gothic style, was completed in 1885 (its spire was removed in 1954). The Parish of Christ Church, designed by the firm of Cram Wentworth & Goodhue in the late Gothic Revival style, was completed in 1895. The neighborhood library, a branch of the Boston Public Library since 1912, was built in 1899. In 2000, a contemporary addition by Schwartz/Silver Architects doubled the library's size. An opera house, built by Leroy J. French in 1897, stands on Fairmount Avenue and currently serves as the home of Hyde Park's Riverside Theatre Works.

Hyde Park has a large number of warehouses and factory buildings from the nineteenth and early twentieth centuries in the Readville neighborhood, along the Neponset River and Mother Brook. The Fairmount Hill neighborhood has many houses built in a variety of late 19th and early 20th Century architectural styles, including Italianate, Gothic Revival and Victorian.

== Government and infrastructure ==
The United States Postal Service operates the Hyde Park Post Office in Cleary Square, as well as the Readville Post Office in Wolcott Square.

Hyde Park is represented in the Boston City Council by Enrique Pepén, who was elected in 2023.

In the Massachusetts General Court, Hyde Park is represented by Representative Robert Consalvo and Senator Mike Rush.

Nationally, Ayanna Pressley represents Hyde Park in the US House of Representatives.

== Community resources ==
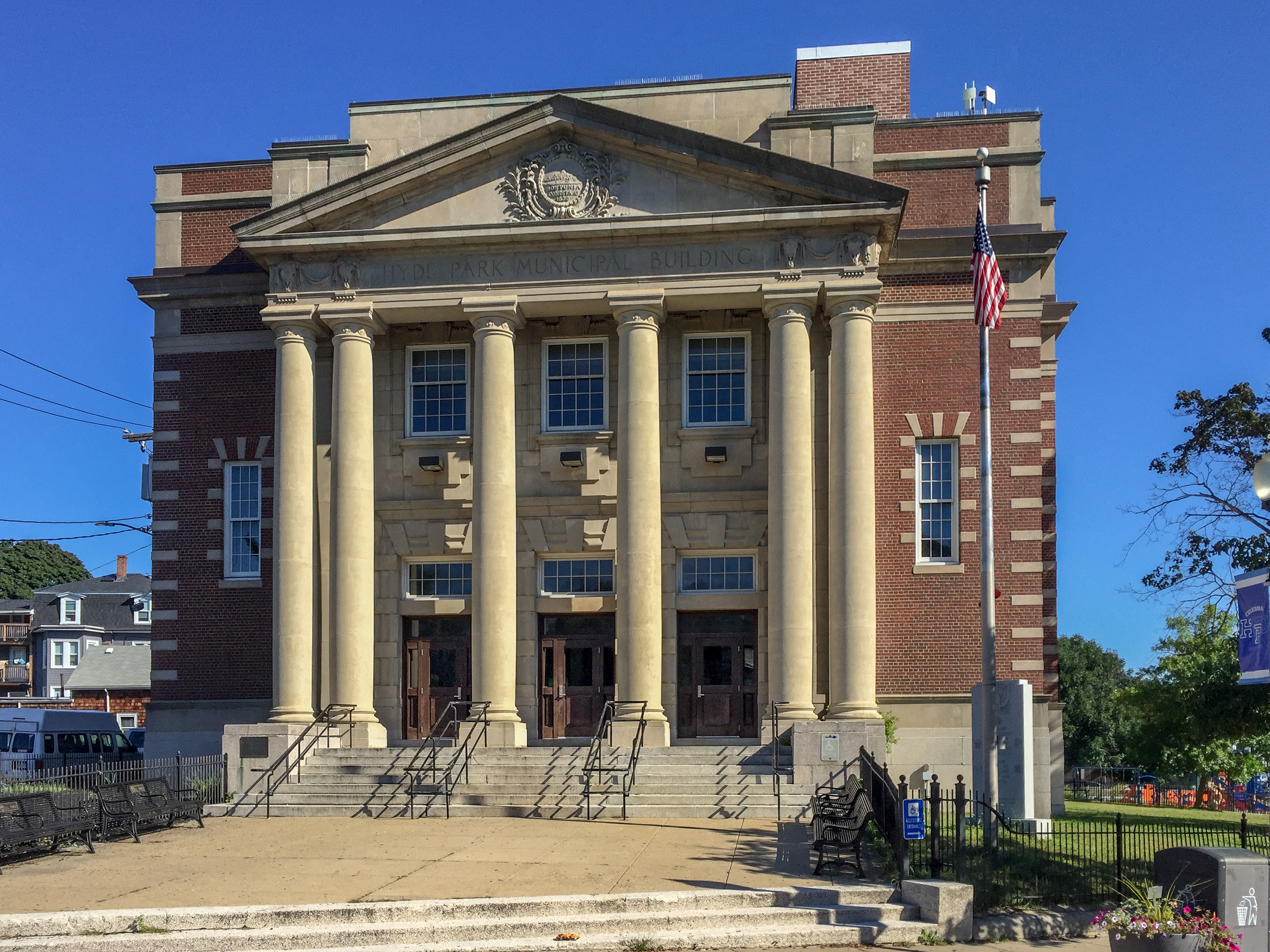
The former Hyde Park Municipal Building, 1179 River Street

A primary community resource is the BCYF Hyde Park Community Center. The community has been served for over 100 years by the center. It is housed in the former Hyde Park Municipal Building. The building was renovated in 2007 in order to accommodate more services and people. The Community Center provides diverse activities including adult education classes, senior citizen computer training and youth sports.

Hyde Park is also home to one of Boston's two municipal golf courses. George Wright Golf Course is named after former Hyde Park resident and hall of fame baseball player George Wright.

11 parks and playgrounds are spread across Hyde Park as well as numerous open spaces. The Stony Brook Reservation is the largest, containing over 400 acres of managed land and 10 miles of hiking paths. Other public parks and playgrounds include Lacono Playground and Reservation Road Park.

The Hyde Park plaques decorate the area across the street from the Hyde Park Library. The bronze plaques commemorate special people and events of Hyde Park. They were created by Gregg Lefevre and installed in 2000 as part of an effort to provide glimpses of Hyde Park's history and culture.

Riverside Theater Works was originally created by Hyde Park resident and music teacher, Marietta Phinney. The live theater is located in 14,000-square-foot facility and features a 156-seat opera house. Riverside Theater Works offers musical theater classes and serves the community by hosting recitals, meetings, fundraisers, and community gatherings.

== Housing ==
Of the roughly 12,000 housing units in Hyde Park, 60% are owner-occupied. The number of rental units grew by 3% between 2000 and 2010. Six percent of housing units are vacant, the vast majority of which are apartments.

During the 2008 financial crisis, Hyde Park experienced a large increase in the number of financially distressed properties. Some sections of Hyde Park experienced foreclosures at twice the rate of the rest of Boston, and triple what the rate had been in 2006. Comparing 2011 and 2012, foreclosures dropped by 75% year over year.

The Boston Housing Authority maintains one public housing complex called Fairmont. Consisting of a total of 202 housing units, the Fairmont complex was built more than 40 years ago. The units are condo-styled and are offered primarily to low-income and elderly residents.

== Liveability ==
Hyde Park is significantly more suburban in nature than other Boston neighborhoods, and does not have many common amenities. It has fewer sit down restaurants than any neighborhood other than Mattapan, low walkability, fewer than 10 liquor licenses, and limited public transit, with only three primary bus lines connecting to the MBTA subway system. Much of the neighborhood is also only serviced by commuter rail trains in higher cost zones than the rest of the city. The cost of living is very reasonable, especially for the amount of resources it has. The total crime rate is 1,896/100k, 1% lower than Boston and 31% lower than the national average; violent crimes are 481/100k; the high school graduation rate is 83%; employment median household income is $71,112, 7% percent higher than Boston's; and median housing cost is $524,668, 3% percent lower than Boston as a whole.

== Education ==
=== Primary and secondary schools ===
The Boston Public School system operates the public schools in Hyde Park. Public elementary and middle schools include the Henry S. Grew, the William E. Channing and the Franklin D. Roosevelt K-8 School. The Elihu Greenwood School & the William Barton Rogers Middle School were closed in 2015. Another Course to College high school now occupies the former Greenwood building.

Local public charter schools include Academy of the Pacific Rim, Boston Preparatory Charter Public School, and the Boston Renaissance Charter School.

=== Hyde Park High School ===
Hyde Park has had a public high school since the early days of its township, housed in various locations, but the first proper building for Hyde Park High School was completed in 1902 at Harvard Avenue and Everett Street; the building was expanded and held the now closed Rogers Middle School. The high school became part of the Boston Public School system following the town's annexation, and a new building was built in the 1920s at Central and Metropolitan Avenues. In 2005 the high school was re-designated the Hyde Park Education Complex, which housed three smaller high schools: the Community Academy of Science and Health (CASH), The Engineering School, and the Social Justice Academy. The complex was shut down in 2011; both the Engineering School and the Social Justice Academy closed, and CASH was relocated to Dorchester. As of the 2012–13 school year, the complex is occupied by Boston Community Leadership Academy (BCLA) and New Mission High School (NMHS).

=== Private schools ===
Hyde Park is home to the private school Boston Trinity Academy and New Beginnings Academy.

=== Higher education ===
Hyde Park is home to the private Boston Baptist College, located on Fairmount Hill.

=== Former schools ===
- The Engineering School
- Elihu Greenwood Elementary School
- Fairmount School (building now houses Boston Police Academy)
- Lt. Joseph P. Kennedy Jr. Memorial School (building now houses Boston Trinity Academy)
- Most Precious Blood Elementary School (building now houses Boston Preparatory Charter Public School)
- Social Justice Academy
- St. Anne's School (closed)
- St. Pius X School (closed)
- William Barton Rogers Middle School (closed)
- Hyde Park High School (building now known as Hyde Park Education Complex)
- Hyde Park Academy (closed)

== Public libraries ==
Boston Public Library operates the Hyde Park Branch Library, which won an AIA architectural prize. Groundbreaking for the Hyde Park Town Library occurred in December 1898; construction was completed and the building opened in September 1899. In 1912, the library became part of the Boston Public Library after Hyde Park was annexed by Boston. In 1997, ground was broken for an addition and renovation of the original portion of the facility. A grand reopening ceremony, attended by Mayor of Boston Thomas M. Menino, was held in January 2000. The library received the 2006 Best Accessible Design Award in May of that year.

== Transportation ==
Hyde Park is served by the MBTA Commuter Rail system at three stations: Hyde Park (Providence/Stoughton Line and Franklin/Foxboro Line), Fairmount (Fairmount Line), and Readville (Franklin/Foxboro Line and Fairmount Line). MBTA bus routes 24, 32, 33, 40 and 50 operate through Hyde Park; they connect to MBTA subway service at Forest Hills and Mattapan.

The privately owned Sumner Heights and Hazelwood Valley Railroad was operated experimentally around 1875 with a gauge of only 10 in (254 mm).

== Notable people ==
- Ricardo Arroyo, Boston City Councilor District 5, the first Puerto Rican to hold the position in the history of Boston.
- Oliver F. Atkins, photographer who worked for the Saturday Evening Post and as personal photographer to President Richard Nixon.
- Ella F. Boyd, teacher and geologist, elected to the Hyde Park school board five times, served from 1895 to 1910
- Henry Beebee Carrington, Union general during the Civil War, one of the founders of the Republican party
- Rebecca Lee Crumpler, first black female doctor in the United States
- Arthur Vining Davis, important figure in the development of Alcoa and its chairman of the board from 1928 to 1958
- Manny Delcarmen, relief pitcher for the Washington Nationals
- Ted Donato, selected by the Boston Bruins in the fifth round (98th overall) of the 1987 NHL Draft; hockey head coach at Harvard University
- Robert Frederick Drinan, Roman Catholic Jesuit priest, lawyer, human rights activist, dean of Boston College law school and Democratic U.S. Representative from Massachusetts
- John Joseph Enneking, American Impressionist painter (1841–1911)
- Arthur Fiedler, long time conductor of the Boston Pops.
- Steven F. Gaughan, police officer killed in the line of duty in Prince George's County; born and raised in Hyde Park
- Angelina Emily Grimké, abolitionist and suffragist
- Archibald Grimké, African-American lawyer, intellectual, journalist, diplomat and community leader.
- Childe Hassam, artist, lived in Hyde Park in his early years
- Charles Wilson Killam, architect, engineer, and professor at Harvard University
- Thomas Menino, former mayor of the City of Boston
- Stephen J. Murphy, Suffolk Register of Deeds, former Boston City Council President and Councilor-at-Large
- Elizabeth Short, waitress and murder victim in 1947, who came to be known as "the Black Dahlia"; born in Hyde Park
- Joseph M. Tierney, politician, served on the Boston City Council for 15 years
- Maura Tierney, actress, famous for her roles in NewsRadio and ER
- William Monroe Trotter, African American activist, newspaper editor, founder of the Boston Guardian, early foundational member of NAACP, early foundational member of the Boston Literary and Historical Association, and founder of the National Equal Rights League.
- Theodore Dwight Weld, Abolitionist author and lecturer, instrumental to the founding of the Hyde Park library

== Works cited ==
- Neiswander, Judith (2024). Mother Brook and the Mills of East Dedham. Damianos Publishing. ISBN 978-1-941573-66-2.
