= Sumner Heights and Hazelwood Valley Railroad =

Minimum-gauge railway near Boston

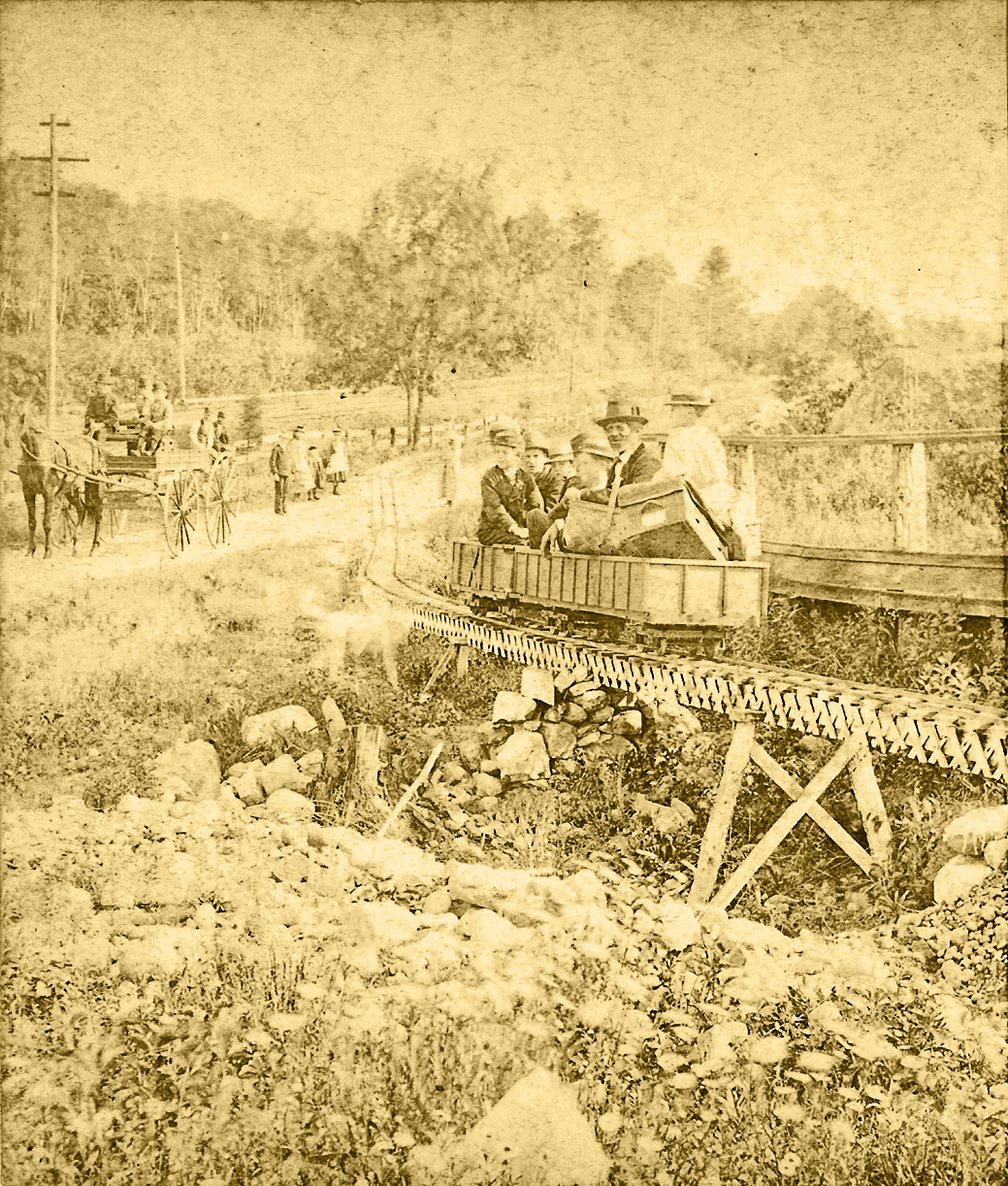
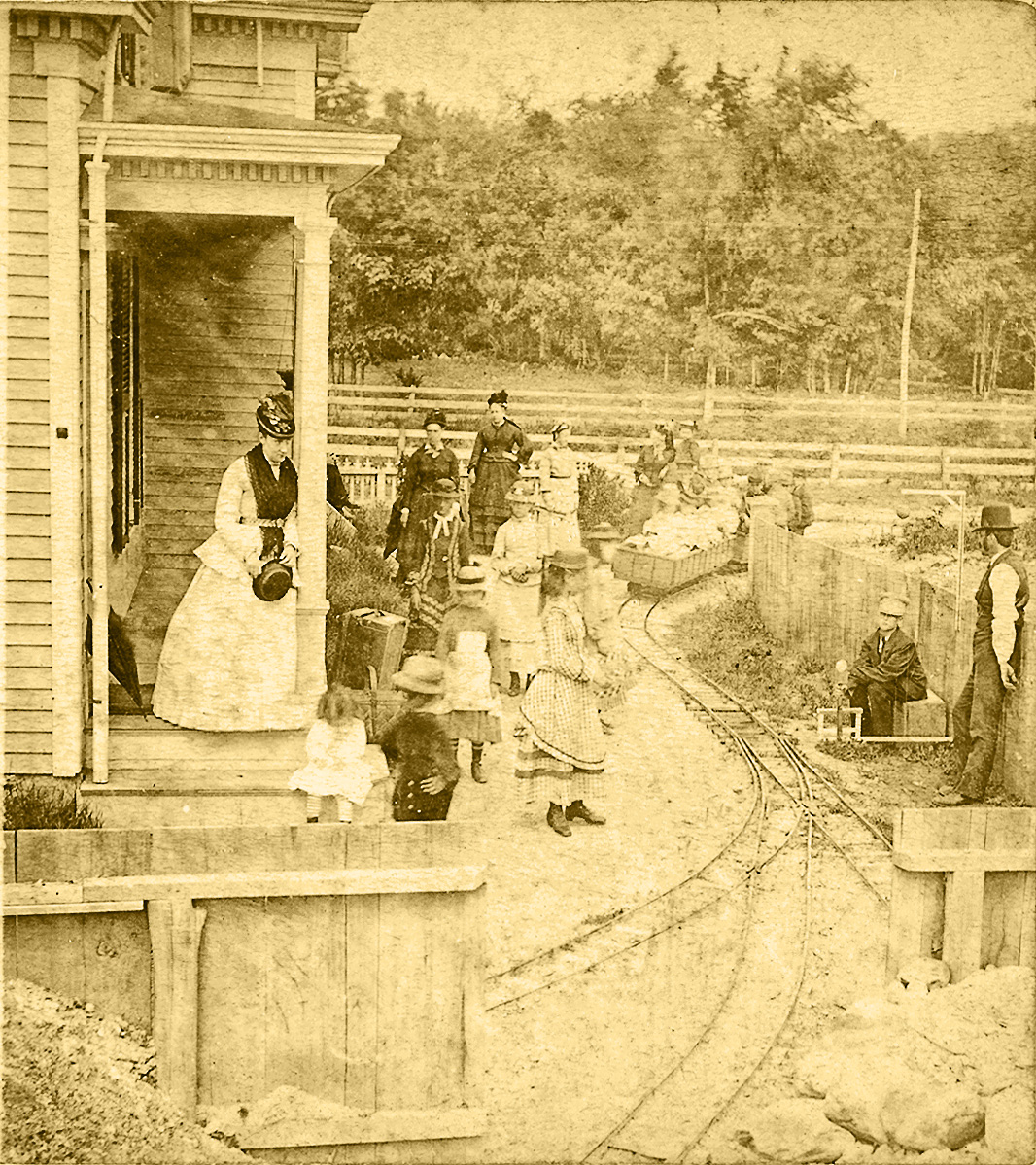
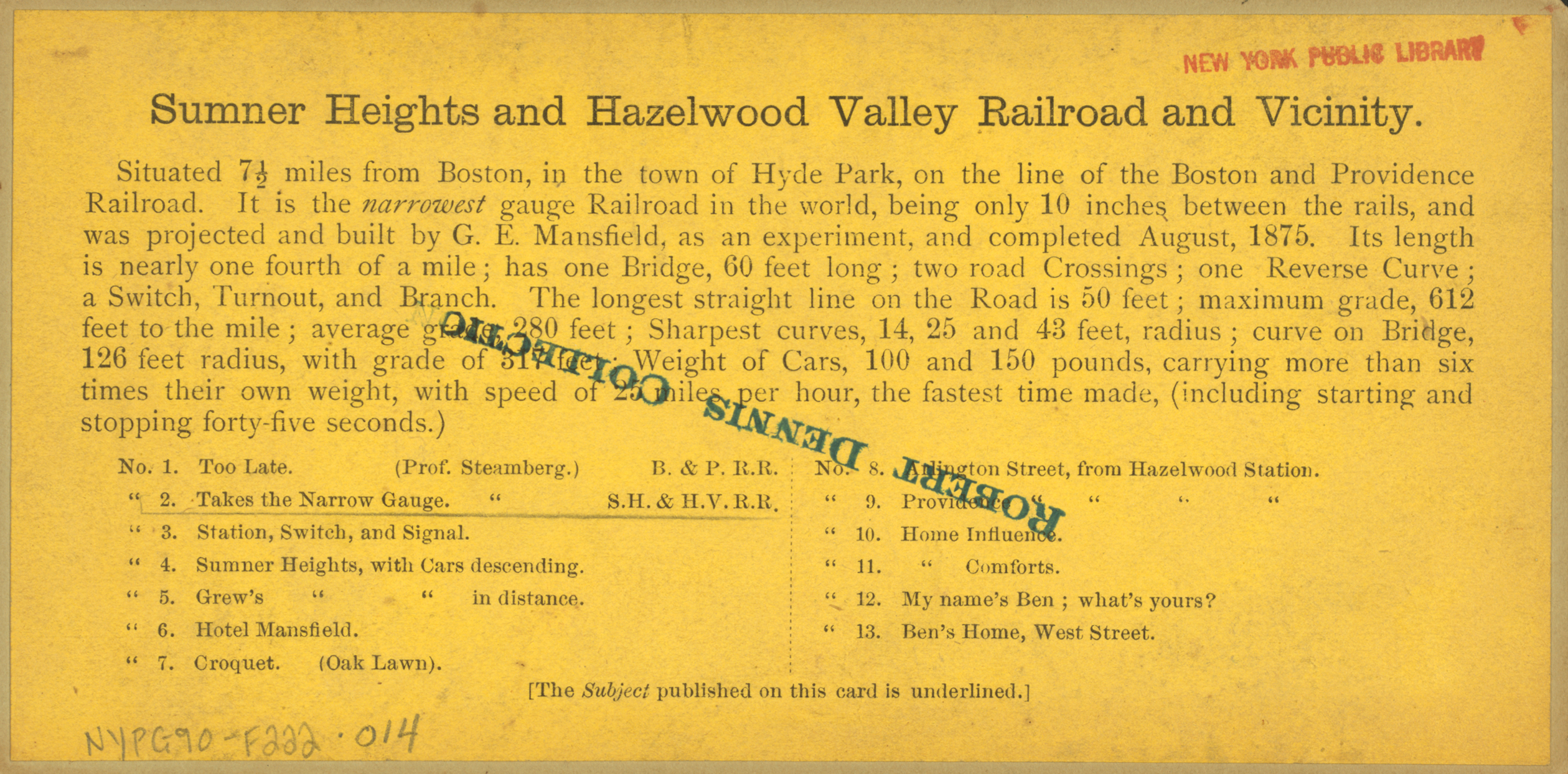
- Joy ride on the railroad Station switch and signal Historic description of the railroad and its use

Technical
- Line length: Nearly 1/4 mile (0.4 km)
- Track gauge: 10 in (254 mm)

The Sumner Heights and Hazelwood Valley Railroad was built as an experimental minimum-gauge railway near Boston in 1875.

== Route and its construction ==
The Sumner Heights and Hazelwood Valley Railroad and Vicinity. It was situated in the town of Hyde Park, 7 1/2 miles (12.1 km) from Boston, on the line of the Boston and Providence Railroad. It was projected and built by George E. Mansfield as an experiment, and completed August 1875. It claimed to have been the narrowest-gauge railroad in the world with a gauge of only 10 in (254 mm) between the rails.

The line started from the summit of a small hill just back of the Hazelwood station, on the Providence Railroad, and after winding round the hill by sharp curves, came down through Mr. Mansfield's back yard, and shot by an apparently very dangerous curve obliquely across a street, closely shaving a street corner, where it ran over a small bridge, and then across another street to the side near the railroad, and thence for a short distance parallel with the latter.

Its length was nearly 1/4 mile (0.4 km). It had one 60-foot-long (18 m) bridge, two level road crossings, one reverse curve as well as a switch, turnout and branch. The longest straight line on the Road was 50 feet (15 m). The maximum grade was 612 feet to the mile (116 ‰). The average grade was 280 feet to the mile (53 ‰). The sharpest curves had radii of 14, 25 and 43 feet (4.3, 7.6 and 13.1 m). The curve on the bridge had a radius of 126 feet (38 m), with grade of 317 feet to the mile (60 ‰).

The ties or sleepers were composed of narrow strips of 1-inch-thick (25 mm) board about 15 inches (380 mm) long, upon which were nailed (with small finish nails) rails made of soft wood, about 1 inch (25 mm) square and 10 inches (250 mm) apart. On these were nailed narrow strips of thin hoop iron, to complete the whole affair.

== Rolling stock and its operation ==
One of the cars used on this road was a platform, about 2 feet (0.61 m) wide and 5 feet (1.5 m) long, and the diameter of the wheels was 5 inches (130 mm). The weights of the cars were 100 and 150 pounds (45 and 68 kg), carrying more than six times their own weight, at a speed of 25 miles per hour (40 km/h). The fastest time made was 45 seconds, including starting and stopping.

It would seem, at first sight, that the whole affair was a mere boy’s plaything, and a dangerous one at that; but a test of its capacity undeceived the proprietor of such hasty judgment. It would appear, to begin with, that the wheels of the car, with their small flanges, would be sure to jump the track at every curve, but by a peculiarity in the way of connecting them with the car (an invention of Mr. Mansfield) they follow the track in every wind and curve as surely as if they were much larger in diameter and had a corresponding depth of flange. Four heavy men could ride in the car, which descended by gravitation, and was under complete brake control. Those who have ridden upon it were surprised at the absence of oscillation.

== Aftermath ==
George Mansfield subsequently promoted the two-foot gauge. He persuaded the citizens of Billerica in eastern Massachusetts of the economies of a two-foot line, and became general manager of the Billerica and Bedford Railroad when it was chartered in 1876 and built beginning in May 1877. George Mansfield w as obsessed with narrow gauge and reducing what he called "oscillation," a phenomenon which is colloquially called harmonic rock or rock and roll. He did this by placing rail joints parallel to one another. A few years later Mansfield lifted the rails of the Billerica and Bedford Railroad and moved them and the rolling stock to Maine, where it became the Sandy River Railroad and later merged into the Sandy River and Rangeley Lakes Railroad. Mansfield's influence caused the construction of nearly a dozen two-foot–gauge railroads in the state of Maine.
