= Ella F. Boyd =

American educator and geologist

- Born: Ella Frances Neale; July 6, 1855; Boston, Massachusetts
- Died: December 29, 1923 (aged 68); Hyde Park, Massachusetts
- Occupations: educator, geologist
- Years active: 1880s-1910s
- Known for: Five terms on the Hyde Park, Boston school board, from 1895 to 1910
- Notable work: New England geological studies

Ella Frances Neale Boyd (born about 1855, died after March 1910) was an American educator and geologist. She was an elected member of the school board in Hyde Park, Massachusetts from 1895 to 1910.

== Early life ==
Ella Frances Neale was born in Boston, Massachusetts, on July 6, 1855, the daughter of John B. Neale and Mary A. Neale. Her father was a constable who was active in Democratic Party politics in Boston.

== Career ==
Ella F. Boyd was a science teacher in the Boston area. She was elected to the Hyde Park, Massachusetts school board in 1895, 1898, 1901, 1904, and in 1907. She did not run for re-election in 1910, having served fifteen years.

Boyd was a serious amateur geologist. She studied informally with geologists George Hunt Barton and William Otis Crosby, both professors at the Massachusetts Institute of Technology. She was an officer in the Agassiz Association and the Boston Society of Natural History. She represented the Agassiz Association at the Mechanics' Fair in 1892, and organized the group's geological and mineralogical exhibits for the World's Columbian Exposition the following year. She lectured and wrote about geological formations in Massachusetts, in "Geological Formation of Hyde Park" (1892), which was also read at the National Science Club for Women meeting in 1895. She presented a paper on "Granites of Massachusetts and their Origin" at the Women's Section of the World's Congress on Geology meeting in Chicago in 1893. She was a member of the American Association for the Advancement of Science.

== Personal life ==
Ella F. Neale married Frederick Webster Boyd in 1879. They had three daughters.

She died in Hyde Park, on December 29, 1923, and was buried at the Fairview Cemetery in Boston.
