= Mount Hope station =

Mount Hope
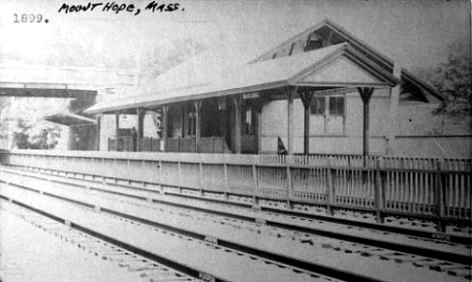
- The inbound station building in 1899

General information
- Location: Blakemore Street; Roslindale, Massachusetts
- Coordinates: 42.2855°N 71.1195°W
- Line: Attleboro Line (Northeast Corridor)
- Platforms: 2 side platforms (former)

History
- Opened: c. 1850s
- Closed: November 3, 1979

Former services
Preceding station	MBTA	Following station
Hyde Park toward Providence or Stoughton	Providence/Stoughton Line	Back Bay toward South Station
Hyde Park toward Franklin	Franklin/Foxboro Line	Back Bay toward South Station
Hyde Park toward Dedham	Dedham Branch Closed 1967	Back Bay toward South Station
Preceding station	New York, New Haven and Hartford Railroad	Following station
Hyde Park toward New Haven	Shore Line	Forest Hills toward Boston
Location

Mount Hope station was a railroad station on the Northeast Corridor in Roslindale, Boston, Massachusetts. The station consisted of two separate depots on opposite sides of the tracks. The brick outbound depot was located just north of the Blakemore Street bridge, while the wooden inbound depot was located south of the overpass.

== History ==
=== Operation ===
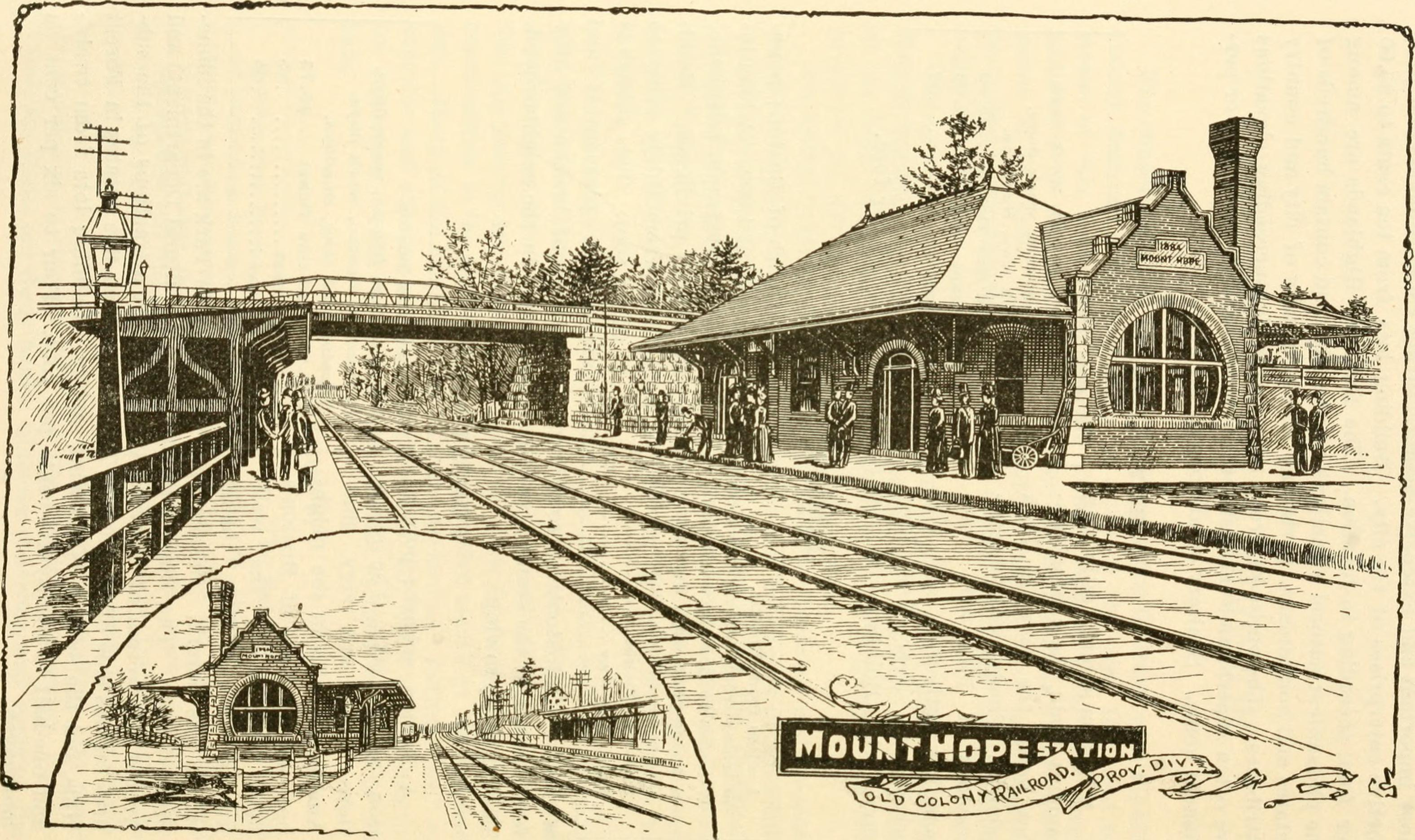
Mount Hope station in an 1889 advertisement for the Old Colony Railroad

The Boston and Providence Railroad opened through West Roxbury (now part of Boston) in 1834. Mount Hope station opened around the 1850s. A small station building was built on the west side of the tracks just south of Blakemore Street in 1869.

Construction of a third track between Mount Hope and Hyde Park took place in 1881–82, completing triple-tracking of the line between Boston and Readville. A bridge was built at that time to carry Blakemore Street over the tracks to eliminate a grade crossing. A stone station building on the west side of the tracks north of Blakemore Street was built in 1884. It was designed by the firm of Sturgis and Brigham. The station was at railroad level below grade; street access was via sets of stairs. The Boston and Providence Railroad was acquired in 1888 by the Old Colony Railroad, which in turn became part of the New York, New Haven and Hartford Railroad in 1893. A wooden station on the east side of the tracks was built around 1898.

The station buildings were closed in 1941 or 1942 after World War II started, but trains still served the station. The inbound building was demolished after a fire and replaced with a small shelter. Ridership declined due to the competing #32 trolley line as well as the general disuse of railroads, but the station was never completely abandoned. The NYNH&H folded into Penn Central in 1969, who sold the line and station to the Massachusetts Bay Transportation Authority in 1973. Conrail took over Penn Central in 1976 and the Boston & Maine Railroad was contracted to operate the southside commuter lines starting in March 1977, thus marking the sixth operator to run trains to Mount Hope.

=== Closure ===
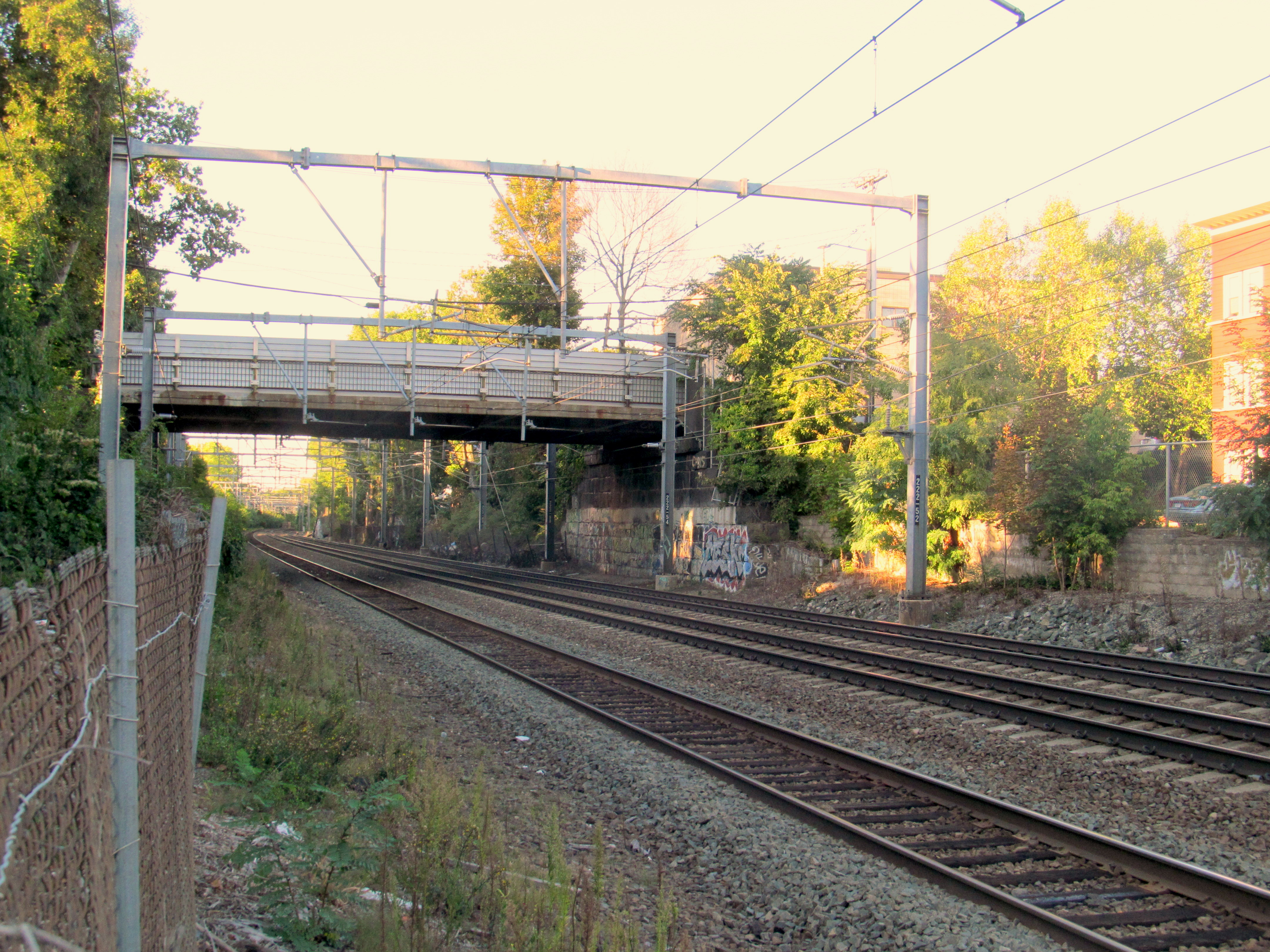
The former station site in 2016

On November 3, 1979, the MBTA closed the tracks from Readville to Back Bay for construction of the Southwest Corridor. Providence and Franklin trains were rerouted via the Fairmount Line, while Mount Hope and Hyde Park were closed. When the corridor reopened to commuter trains in October 1987, only Hyde Park was returned to service. Mount Hope was considered too close to Forest Hills and the Orange Line to be useful. The MBTA offered instead a limited-service stop several hundred yards south at Cummins Highway, but local opinion was against the plan.

Housing units have been erected on the sites of both the inbound and outbound station buildings. The foundation of the outbound building was discovered during construction of a condominium complex. Today, no visible remnants of the station exist.

=== Proposed Orange Line extension ===
Mount Hope is located in a densely populated neighborhood just six miles from downtown Boston, making it a strong candidate for rapid transit service rather than conventional low-frequency commuter rail service. The 1945 Coolidge Commission Report recommended that an extension of the Orange Line south from Forest Hills be built to Dedham via West Roxbury rather than Mount Hope. The 1966 Program for Mass Transportation recommended a bifurcated Orange Line, with one branch to West Roxbury or Hersey and another to Readville or Route 128 via Mount Hope. Various reports over the next two decades continued to recommend various combinations of the extensions; however, due to cost, the 1987 relocation of the Orange Line to the Southwest Corridor was terminated at Forest Hills. Hyde Park, Readville, and the Needham Line instead received limited upgrades, like handicapped accessible platforms.

The extension is still periodically discussed. The 2004 Program for Mass Transportation listed an extension to Route 128 with intermediate stops, including—possibly—Mount Hope, at a cost of $342.8 million. The extension was listed as low priority, due to environmental issues with crossing the wetlands south of Readville, and because the corridor already has commuter rail service.
