= Robert Drinan =

American priest and politician

The Reverend Robert Drinan SJ
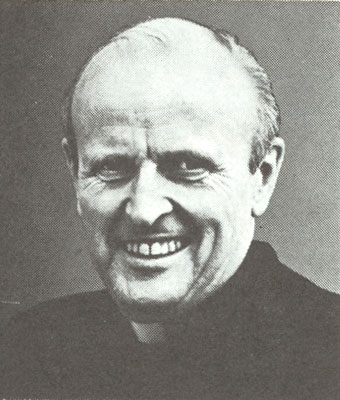

Member of the U.S. House of Representatives from Massachusetts
- In office January 3, 1971 – January 3, 1981
- Preceded by: Philip J. Philbin
- Succeeded by: Barney Frank
- Constituency: 3rd district (1971–73); 4th district (1973–81)

Personal details
- Born: Robert Frederick Drinan; November 15, 1920 Boston, Massachusetts, U.S.
- Died: January 28, 2007 (aged 86) Washington, D.C., U.S.
- Party: Democratic
- Education: Boston College (BA, MA); Georgetown University (LLB, LLM); Pontifical Gregorian University (STD)
- Profession: Priest, legislator, professor

Robert Frederick Drinan SJ (November 15, 1920 – January 28, 2007) was an American Jesuit priest, lawyer, activist, and Democratic U.S. Representative from Massachusetts. He left office in 1981 to obey Pope John Paul II's prohibition on priests holding political office. Drinan was later a professor at Georgetown University Law Center for the last 26 years of his life.

== Education and legal career ==
Drinan grew up in Hyde Park, Massachusetts, the son of Ann Mary (Flanagan) and James John Drinan. He graduated from Hyde Park High School in 1938. He received a B.A. and an M.A. from Boston College finishing in 1942, and joined the Society of Jesus the same year; he was ordained as a Catholic priest in 1953. He received an LL.B. and LL.M. from Georgetown University Law Center in 1950, and a doctorate in theology from Gregorian University in Rome in 1954.

Drinan studied in Florence for two years before returning to Boston, where he was admitted to the bar in 1956. He served as dean of the Boston College Law School from 1956 until 1970, during which time he also taught as a professor of family law and church-state relations. During this period he was a visiting professor at other schools including the University of Texas School of Law. He served on several Massachusetts state commissions convened to study legal issues such as judicial salaries and lawyer conflicts of interest.

== Political career ==
In 1970, Drinan sought a seat in Congress on an anti-Vietnam War platform, narrowly defeating longtime Representative Philip J. Philbin, who was serving on the House Armed Services Committee, in the Democratic primary. Drinan went on to win election to the House of Representatives, and was re-elected four times, serving from 1971 until 1981. He was the first of two Catholic priests (the other being Robert John Cornell of Wisconsin) to serve as a voting member of Congress. (Note: Father Gabriel Richard had served from 1823 to 1825 as a non-voting delegate from the Michigan Territory. Father Robert J. Cornell, a Norbertine priest, became the second Catholic priest to serve as a voting member of Congress as a Representative from Wisconsin, 1975–1979.) Drinan sat on various House committees, and served as the chair of the Subcommittee on Criminal Justice of the House Judiciary Committee. He was also a delegate to the 1972 Democratic National Convention.

Drinan introduced a resolution in July 1973 calling for the impeachment of President Richard Nixon, though not for the Watergate Scandal that ultimately ended Nixon's presidency. Drinan believed that Nixon's secret bombing of Cambodia was illegal, and as such, constituted a "high crime and misdemeanor." House Majority Leader Tip O'Neill ultimately convinced Drinan not to press the articles of impeachment further because it would have made the impeachment process against Richard Nixon emerging from the Senate Watergate Committee's findings much more politically difficult. O'Neill subsequently assigned the house whips John J. McFall and John Brademas to tabling any vote on the resolution and reached an agreement with House Minority Leader Gerald Ford not to bring the motion to a vote. One year later, the Judiciary Committee voted 21 to 12 against including that charge among the articles of impeachment that were eventually approved and reported out to the full House of Representatives.

Throughout Drinan's political career, his overt support of abortion rights drew significant opposition from Church leaders. They had repeatedly requested that he not hold political office. Drinan attempted to reconcile his position with official Church doctrine by stating that while he was personally opposed to abortion, considering it "virtual infanticide," its legality was a separate issue from its morality. This argument failed to satisfy his critics. According to The Wall Street Journal, Drinan played a key role in the pro-choice platform's becoming a common stance of politicians from the Kennedy family.

In 1980, Pope John Paul II unequivocally demanded that all priests withdraw from electoral politics. Drinan complied and did not seek reelection. The Boston Globe quoted Drinan's explanation of why he did not renounce the priesthood to stay in office:

It is just unthinkable. ... I am proud and honored to be a priest and a Jesuit. As a person of faith I must believe that there is work for me to do which somehow will be more important than the work I am required to leave.

Following his death, members of Congress honored Drinan's memory with a moment of silence on the House floor on January 29, 2007.

== Teaching, writing, and later life ==
Drinan taught at the Georgetown University Law Center in Washington, D.C., from 1981 to 2007, where his academic work and classes focused on legal ethics and international human rights. He privately sponsored human rights missions to countries such as Chile, the Philippines, El Salvador, and Vietnam. In 1987 he founded the Georgetown Journal of Legal Ethics. He regularly contributed to law reviews and journals, and authored several books including The Mobilization of Shame: A World View of Human Rights, published by Yale University Press in 2001.

After leaving Congress, in June 1981, Drinan succeeded Patsy Mink as the president of Americans for Democratic Action. He served in the position until June 1984, when he was succeeded by the man who succeeded him in Congress; Barney Frank.

Drinan continued to be a vocal supporter of abortion rights, much to the ire of some of the Catholic hierarchy, and notably spoke out in support of President Bill Clinton's veto of the Partial-Birth Abortion Ban Act in 1996. In his weekly column for the Catholic New York, Cardinal John O'Connor sharply denounced Drinan. "You could have raised your voice for life; you raised it for death," the cardinal wrote, "Hardly the role of a lawyer. Surely not the role of a priest."

Drinan died of pneumonia and congestive heart failure on January 28, 2007, in Washington, D.C.

Upon Drinan's death, the Georgetown University Law Center Dean, T. Alexander Aleinikoff, made the following statement: "Few have accomplished as much as Father Drinan and fewer still have done so much to make the world a better place. His passing is a terrible loss for the community, the country and the world."

John H. Garvey, Dean of the Boston College Law School, said, "It is difficult to say in a few words what Father Drinan means to this institution. It is safe to say that his efforts as Dean forever changed how the Law School does business, taking us from a regional school to a nationally recognized leader in legal education. He did this without diminishing the essential core of what makes BC Law special, maintaining our commitment to educating the whole person—mind, body and spirit—while nourishing a community of learners intent on supporting one another in reaching their common goal. When we say that Boston College Law School educates 'lawyers who lead good lives,' we need look no further than Father Drinan to understand what those words mean. We are forever in his debt."

Following his death, many Georgetown Law School students and faculty shared their reminiscences of Father Drinan, and wrote of his influence on their lives, on Georgetown University's website. Georgetown Law Magazine published a special tribute supplement in Spring 2007.

== Sexual assault allegation ==
In 2012, five years after Drinan's death, Slate writer Emily Yoffe said that he had sexually assaulted her when she was "a teenager of 18 or 19." Drinan's niece responded to the allegations by calling it "odd that anyone would come forward with this allegation decades later when our uncle is in no position to defend himself."

== Associations and awards ==
Drinan served as a member of the American Bar Association House of Delegates until his death and was chair of the ABA Section on Individual Rights and Responsibilities. In 2004, Drinan received the ABA Medal, the organization's highest honor for distinguished service in law. On May 10, 2006, Drinan was presented the Distinguished Service Award by then Speaker Dennis Hastert and then Minority Leader Nancy Pelosi on behalf of the House of Representatives. He received 21 honorary doctorates during his life.

Drinan served on the Board of Directors of People for the American Way, the International League for Human Rights, the Lawyers Committee for Human Rights, the International Labor Rights Fund, Americans for Democratic Action, and the NAACP Legal Defense and Educational Fund. He was elected to the Common Cause National Governing Board in 1981 and 1997. For many years he was Chairman of PeacePAC, a division of Council for a Livable World, and a Director of the Center for Arms Control and Non-Proliferation.

The College Democrats of Boston College annually present an award in honor of Drinan to prominent Catholic Democratic figures. Past awardees include John Kerry, Donna Brazile, and Massachusetts Lt. Gov. Tim Murray.

Georgetown University Law Center awards the Robert F. Drinan, S.J., Public Service Award to alumni "whose careers, like Fr. Drinan's, enhance human dignity and advance justice."

== Sources ==
- Lapomarda, Vincent A. "A Jesuit Runs for Congress: The Rev. Robert F. Drinan, S.J. and His 1970 Campaign." Journal of Church and State 15, no. 2 (1973): 205–22. http://www.jstor.org/stable/23914637.
- LEVENTMAN, PAULA GOLDMAN, and SEYMOUR LEVENTMAN. "Congressman Drinan S.J., and His Jewish Constituents." American Jewish Historical Quarterly 66, no. 2 (1976): 215–48. http://www.jstor.org/stable/23880289.

U.S. House of Representatives
Preceded by Philip J. Philbin	Member of the U.S. House of Representatives from Massachusetts's 3rd congressional district January 3, 1971 – January 3, 1973	Succeeded by Harold Donohue
Preceded by Harold Donohue	Member of the U.S. House of Representatives from Massachusetts's 4th congressional district January 3, 1973 – January 3, 1981	Succeeded by Barney Frank
