= Hyde Park station (MBTA) =

Train station in Boston, Massachusetts, US

Hyde Park
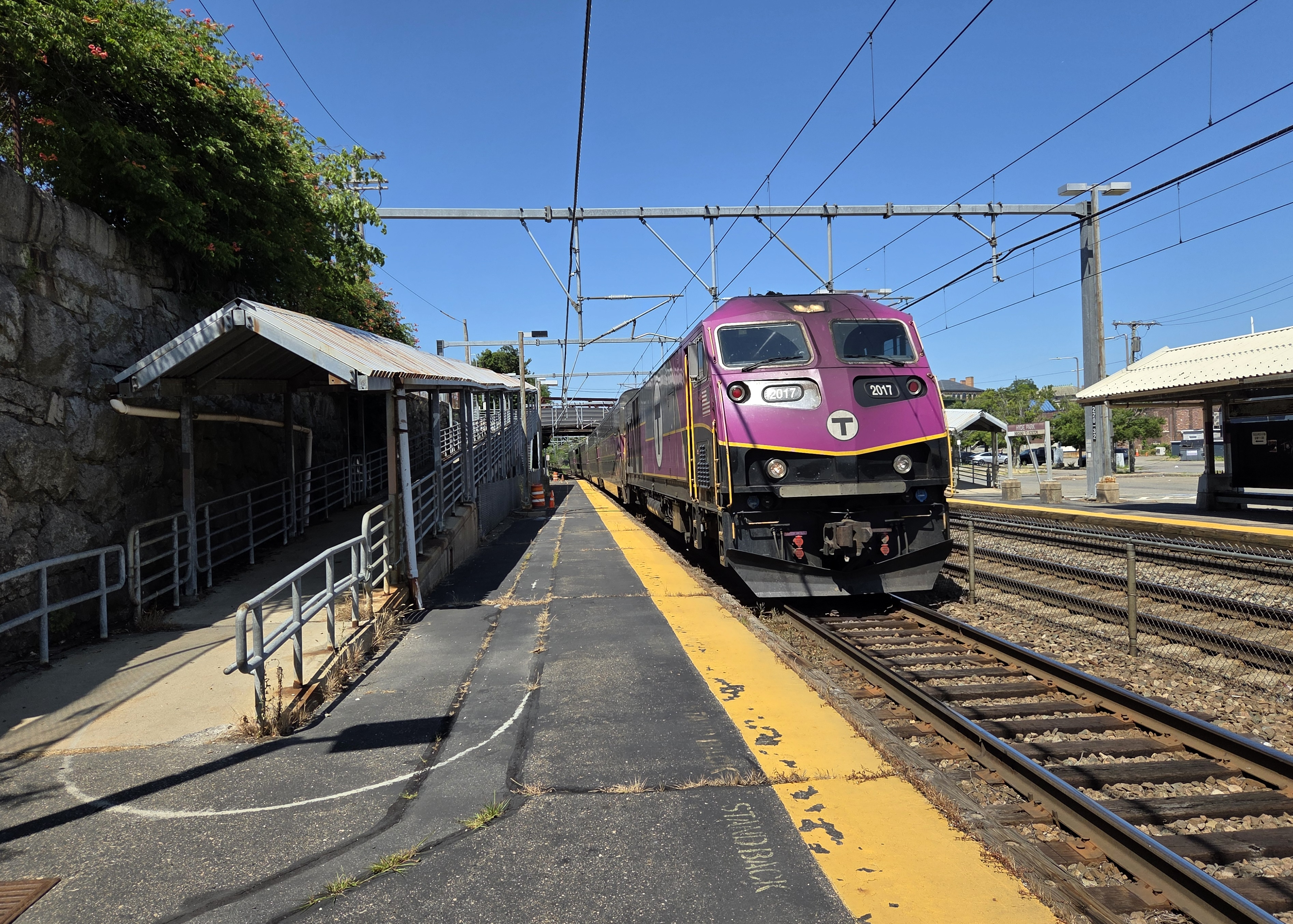
- A Providence-bound train at Hyde Park in 2026

General information
- Location: 1 Pingree Street; Hyde Park, Boston, Massachusetts
- Coordinates: 42.25501°N 71.12557°W
- Line: Attleboro Line (Northeast Corridor)
- Platforms: 2 side platforms
- Tracks: 3
- Connections: MBTA bus: 24, 32, 33, 50

Construction
- Parking: 121 spaces ($4.00 fee)
- Cycle facilities: 10 spaces
- Accessible: Yes

Other information
- Fare zone: 1

History
- Opened: c. 1850
- Closed: November 3, 1979–October 5, 1987
- Former names: Kenny's Bridge

Passengers
- 2024: 435 daily boardings

Services
Preceding station	MBTA	Following station
Readville toward Forge Park/495 or Foxboro	Franklin/Foxboro Line weekdays	Forest Hills limited service toward South Station
Readville toward Wickford Junction or Stoughton	Providence/Stoughton Line	Forest Hills limited service toward South Station
Former services
Preceding station	MBTA	Following station
Readville toward Dedham	Dedham Branch Closed 1967	Mount Hope toward South Station
Preceding station	New York, New Haven and Hartford Railroad	Following station
Readville toward New Haven	Shore Line	Mount Hope toward Boston
Proposed services
Preceding station	MBTA	Following station
Readville toward Battleship Cove or New Bedford	South Coast Rail Phase 2 (2030)	Ruggles toward South Station
Location

Hyde Park station is an MBTA Commuter Rail station in Boston, Massachusetts. It primarily serves the Providence/Stoughton Line, and also serves some weekday outbound Franklin/Foxboro Line trains. It is located on the Northeast Corridor in the Hyde Park neighborhood.

Hyde Park's two platforms serve the outer tracks of the Northeast Corridor, which is three tracks wide through the station; all Amtrak trains to and from Boston pass through the station without stopping. The station is officially located at 1 Pingree Street; however, both platforms are accessible from the River Street bridge via a pair of lengthy ramps. Both platforms are at track level for most of their lengths; however, short high-level platforms provide accessibility on both sides.

== History ==
=== Boston and Providence Railroad ===
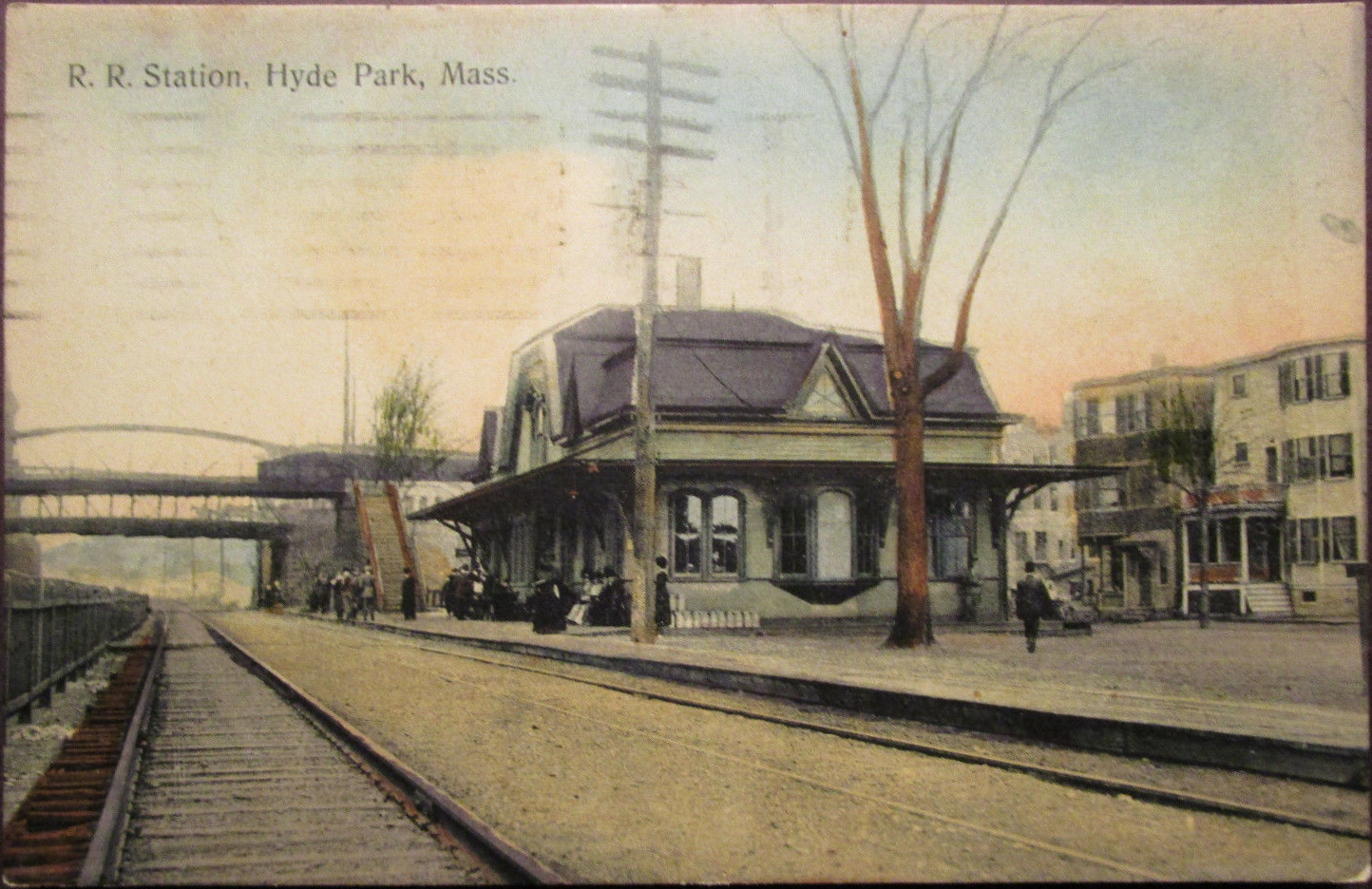
The 1872-built station around 1910

The Boston and Providence Railroad was built through Hyde Park in 1832–34, but a station was not immediately placed in the area, which was still largely unsettled. Henry Grew moved into the area in 1845 and others followed. Within a few years, "Kenny's Bridge" (at today's River Street) was a stop. By 1852, a depot building had been built. It was renamed Hyde Park later that decade.

A new station building, 80 feet (24 m) long and 20 feet (6.1 m) wide, opened on August 5, 1872. Construction of a third track between Mount Hope and Hyde Park took place in 1881–82, completing triple-tracking of the line between Boston and Readville. Hyde Park served as a short turn turnback point for B&P trains from 1880 to 1899; before and after this period, the trains ran to Readville.

The Old Colony Railroad was an early proponent of decorating the grounds of its train stations. Around 1891, the retaining wall at Hyde Park station was covered with Boston ivy, Virginia creeper, and trumpet vine, while the walls of the station building were covered with Boston ivy.

=== New Haven Railroad ===
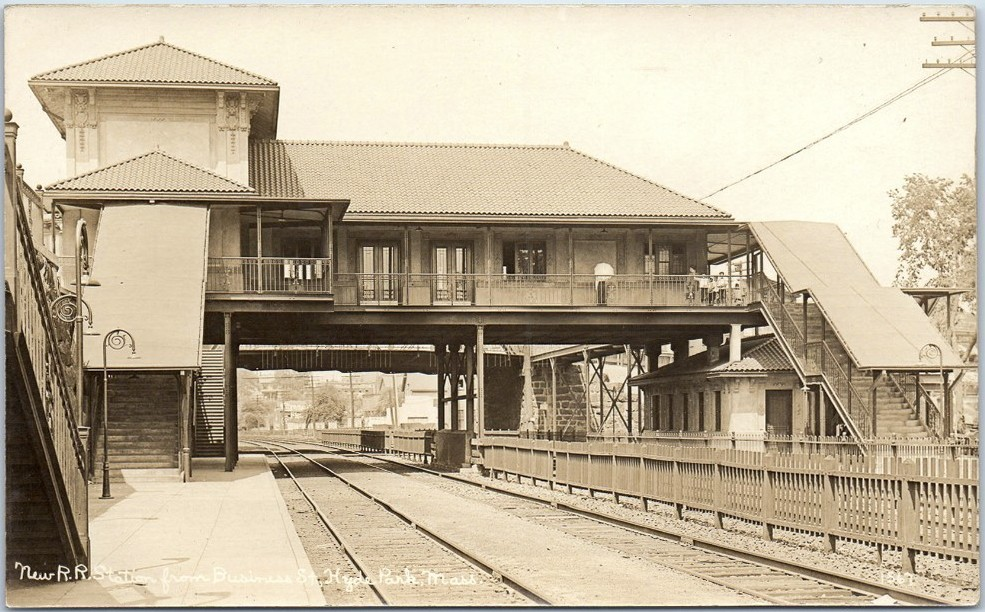
The 1913-built station over the tracks

The Boston & Providence Railroad was acquired by the Old Colony Railroad in 1888, which in turn became part of the New York, New Haven and Hartford Railroad in 1893. On October 24, 1895, the 4:15 pm train from Providence rear-ended the 5:18 pm local train from Sharon at Hyde Park at approximately 5:30 pm. The cause of the wreck was uncertain but may have been faulty signals. The engine of the Providence-originating train was driven halfway through the trailing passenger car of the Sharon train, killing two people and injuring over twenty more. Among the injured were several members of a wedding party.

The New Haven built a large overhead station building adjacent to River Street around 1913, replacing the earlier depot. The station was similar to other stations built by the railroad in and around New York City, rather than to geographically nearer stations. The overhead station structure was demolished during the 1970s, leaving just staircases from River Street leading to bare platforms to serve passengers. The NYNH&H folded into Penn Central in 1969, who sold the line and station to the Massachusetts Bay Transportation Authority (MBTA) in 1973. Conrail took over Penn Central in 1976 and the Boston & Maine Railroad was contracted to operate the southside commuter lines starting in March 1977, thus marking the sixth operator to run trains to Hyde Park.

=== MBTA era ===
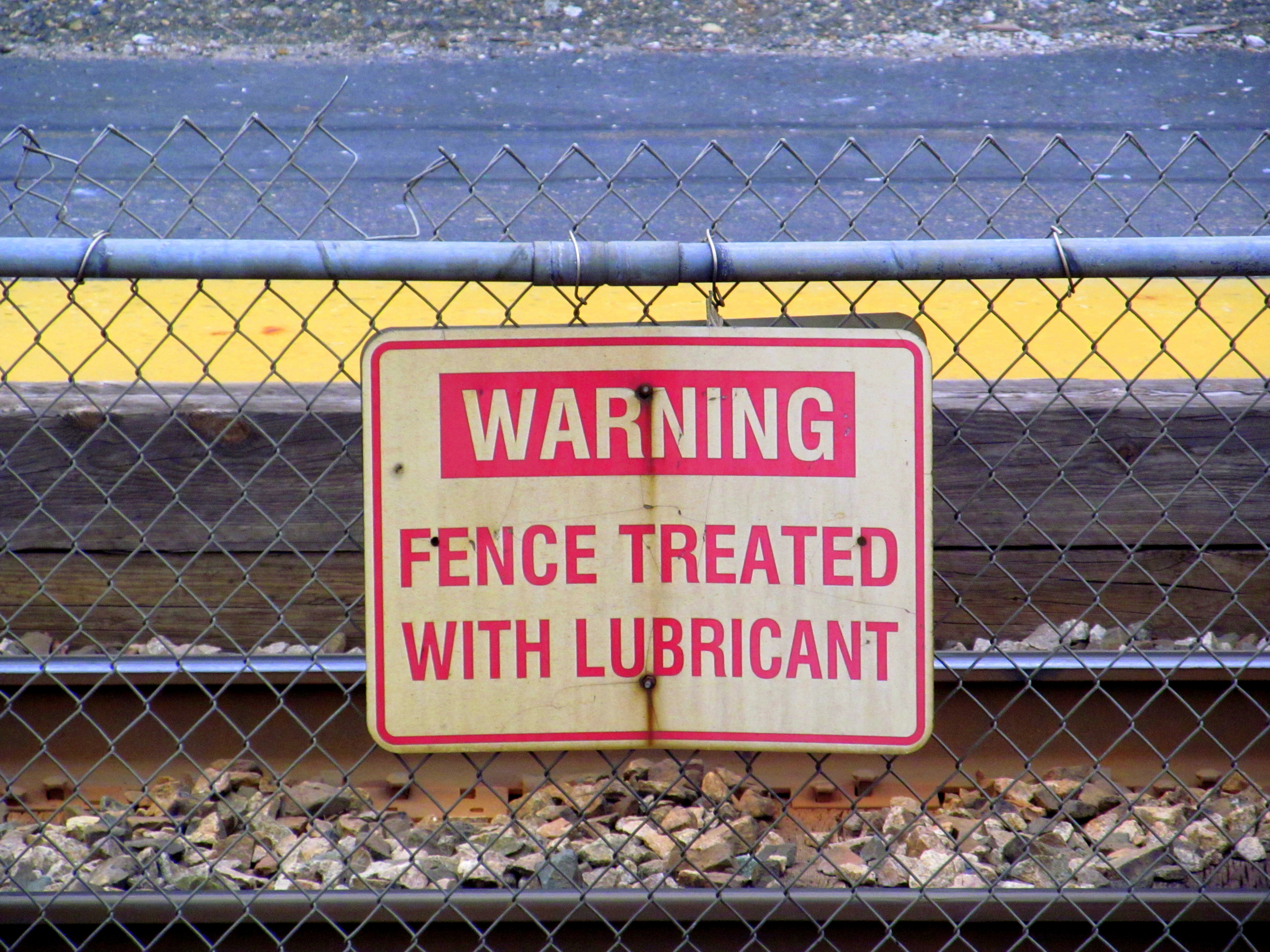
Sign warning about lubricated fence

In November 1979, the station was closed for Southwest Corridor construction, while all Providence and Franklin trains were rerouted over the Fairmount Line. During this time, the MBTA modernized the station with new ramps from River Street and mini-high platforms, making it one of the first MBTA stations to be retrofitted for full handicapped accessibility. The station reopened in October 1987 and has served Providence/Stoughton and Franklin line trains since. When Boston–Foxboro service (for special events at Foxboro Stadium) moved to the Providence/Stoughton Line in 1989, Hyde Park was one of the intermediate stops. However, it was dropped from the special events service in the early 1990s.

Crossing the tracks at Hyde Park is not only illegal but extremely dangerous, because Amtrak trains, as well as almost all Franklin/Foxboro Line trains and some express Providence/Stoughton Line trains, pass through the station without stopping. The blind curve to the north makes it difficult to know if a train is coming; moreover, trains may operate in either direction on any track without warning, and without regard to any normally intuitive current of traffic. (Franklin/Foxboro Line trains in both directions largely use the westernmost track, while most Amtrak trains use the center track.) To discourage trespassers, the fence between tracks is lubricated to make hopping it more difficult. Despite these measures, several trespassers have been struck at Hyde Park, including fatalities in 2011 and 2024.

=== Proposed Orange Line extension ===
Hyde Park is located in a densely populated neighborhood just eight miles from downtown Boston, and has long been reckoned as a strong candidate for rapid transit service rather than conventional low-frequency commuter rail service. As early as 1945, the Coolidge Commission Report recommended that an extension of the Main Line Elevated (now the Orange Line) south from Forest Hills be built to Dedham via West Roxbury rather than Hyde Park. The 1966 Program for Mass Transportation recommended a bifurcated Orange Line, with one branch to West Roxbury or Hersey and another to Readville or Route 128 via Hyde Park. Various reports over the next two decades continued to recommend various combinations of the extensions; however, due to cost, the 1987 relocation of the Orange Line to the Southwest Corridor was terminated at Forest Hills. Hyde Park, Readville, and the Needham Line instead received limited upgrades like accessible platforms.

The extension is still periodically discussed. The 2004 Program for Mass Transportation listed an extension to Route 128 with intermediate stops at Mount Hope, Hyde Park, and Readville at a cost of $342.8 million. The extension was listed as low priority due to environmental issue with crossing the wetlands south of Readville, and because the corridor already had commuter rail service.
