= The Engineering School =

Defunct high school in Boston, Massachusetts, US

Coordinates: 42.2628°N 71.1179°W

The Engineering School was a high school serving grades 9–12 that was located in Boston, Massachusetts, United States. It was founded in 2005 and existed until 2011.
