= Asplund Pavilion =

Church in Italy

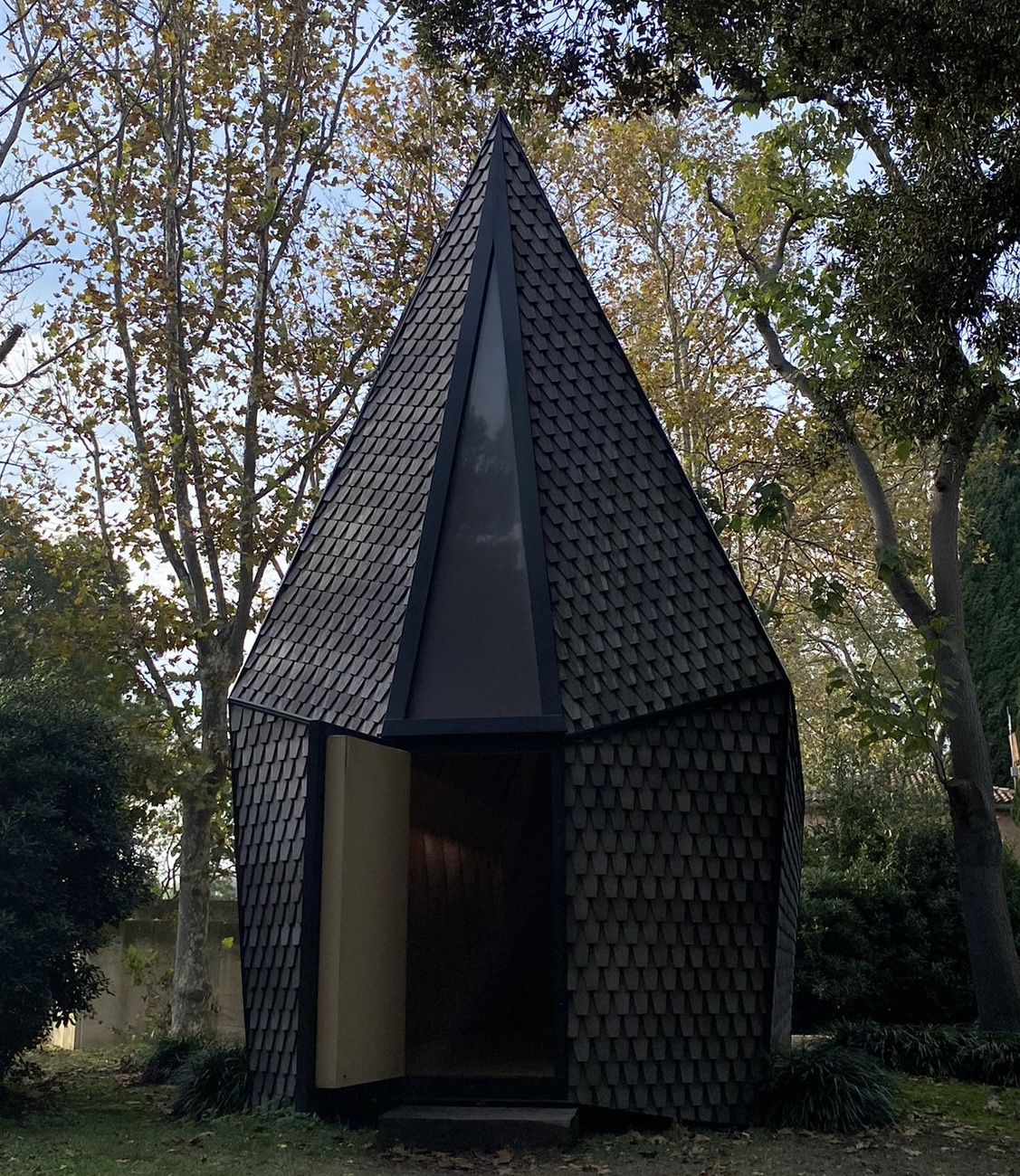
- Asplund Pavilion, San Giorgio Maggiore, 2023.

- Location within Venice

General information
- Location: San Giorgio Maggiore, Venice, Italy
- Coordinates: 45.427145°N 12.343976°E
- Completed: 2018

Height
- Height: 8 metres (26 ft)

Technical details
- Material: Wood

Design and construction
- Architects: Francesco Magnani, Traudy Pelzel

The Asplund Pavilion (Italian: Padiglione Asplund) is an Installation art structure built in 2018 in Venice, Italy. It is located at the Cini Foundation in a forest on the island of San Giorgio Maggiore. It was created for the 16th Venice Biennale art exhibition as one of eleven structures for the "Vatican Chapels" project, which was promoted by the Holy See. The project was the first time the Holy See had sponsored an art project at the exhibition. The Asplund Pavilion is noted for offering insights into contemporary perspectives on worship spaces from architects representing diverse cultural backgrounds.

The project was inspired by the Skogskapellet (English: Woodland Chapel), designed in 1920 by the architect Erik Gunnar Asplund in the Skogskyrkogården (English: Woodland Cemetery) in Stockholm, Sweden. The Pavilion is entirely made of wood and contains an exhibition of original drawings and models by the architect Asplund.

== History ==
The Holy See took part in the 16th International Architecture Exhibition of the Venice Biennale for the first time in 2018. Led by directors Francesco Dal Co and Micol Forti, the project team included eleven international architects, who reimagined Gunnar Asplund's 1920 Forest Chapel in Stockholm's cemetery within the contemporary socio-cultural context. The Asplund Pavilion was the first chapel constructed for the project and it was designed by two Italian architects, Francesco Magnani and Traudy Pelzel. It was built by Alpi, an Italian wood manufacturer.

The participating architects included:

- Andrew Berman (United States)
- Carla Juacaba (Brazil)
- Eduardo Souto de Moura (Portugal)
- Eva Prats and Ricardo Flores (Spain)
- Francesco Cellini (Italy)
- Francesco Magnani and Traudy Pelzel (Italy)
- Javier Corvalan (Paraguay)
- Norman Foster (Great Britain)
- Sean Godsell (Australia)
- Smiljan Radic (Chile)
- Teronobu Fujimori (Japan)

Each design adhered to the requirement of using materials assigned to each team provided by sponsoring commercial partners in the construction sector. The cost of materials was met by the sponsors, not the Vatican. Companies which supplied materials, technology and supported the construction costs included: Alpi; Barth Interni; Gruppofallani; Laboratorio Morselletto; Leucos; LignoAlp; Maeg; Moretti; Panariagroup; Piaggio Group; Sacaim; Saint-Gobain (Italy); Secco Sistemi; Simeon; Tecno; Terna; Zintek.

=== The Vatican Chapels Project ===
The Vatican Chapels project comprises 10 chapels and the Asplund Pavilion, aimed at exploring and reinterpreting the concept of sacred spaces in contemporary society. The Holy See created the project to combine chapels with tourism, based on modern changes in how individuals seek peace, quiet and spiritual space.

The Holy See commissioned eleven international architects for the project to create new chapel designs, providing contemporary interpretation from different cultural backgrounds. The project was created to better understand how people view Catholic places of worship and different styles in the 21st century.

The eleven chapels are categorized into two archetypal groups:

- those aligned with the archetype of the hut, based on the concept of a primary interior protective space
- those following the archetype of the totem, based on an architectural inclination that relinquishes its inherent spatiality, serving as a pre-existing space, transformed through the insertion of an element that alters its proximity in relation to the surrounding space

The Asplund Pavilion conforms to the archetype of the hut and is based on a Forest Chapel. It functions as a transitional space, incorporating elements of both the extroverted hut and the introverted hut within its design. The Pavilion is designed to confine an interior space isolated from its surroundings, and define the space by establishing a direct relationship with the exterior.

The term interior cabin archetype denotes chapels characterized by a precisely defined interior space, that is differentiated from the exterior. This archetype aligns with the Catholic Church's common practice of isolating sacred spaces from their surroundings, such as the interior space of the Forest Chapel.

List of the ten "Vatican Chapels"
Architect	Company	Category	Material	Measurements
Terunobu Fujimori	LignoAlp Barth Interni	Hut	Wood	8.5 metres (28 ft) x 6 metres (20 ft) Entrance door width: 40 centimetres (16 in)
Souto de Moura	Laboratorio Morseletto	Hut	Vicenza stone	Total area: 30 square metres (320 sq ft)
Smiljan Radic	Saint-Gobain Italia	Hut	Reinforced concrete, steel, wood, glass	Height: 5 metres (16 ft) Roof: 3 metres (9.8 ft)x6 metres (20 ft)
Andrew Berman	Moretti Terna	Hut	Traslucid polycarbonate, wood	Triangular plan: 7 metres (23 ft) for each side
Francesco Cellini	Panariagroup	Totem	Steel, porcelain stoneware	
Norman Foster	Tecno Terna Maeg	Hut	Metal, wood	Length: 12 metres (39 ft) Height: 6 metres (20 ft)
Javier Corvalàn	Simeon	Totem	Plywood, steel	/
Ricardo Flores y Eva Prats	Saint-Gobain Italia	Hut	Wood, red brick, "cocciopesto" ( blend of lime and crushed brick)	/
Sean Godsell	Maeg Zintek Nice	Totem	Steel	Structure : 12 metres (39 ft) long Base : 2.5 metres (8 ft 2 in) x 2.5 metres (8 ft 2 in)
Carla Juacaba	Secco Sistemi	Totem	Stainless steel	Length : 8 metres (26 ft) Width : 12 centimetres (4.7 in)

== Architects and designers ==
- Francesco Magnani and Traudy Pelzel are the architects of the Asplund Pavilion. Both graduated from IUAV in Venice, Traudy Pelzel in 1994 and Francesco Magnani in 1999. They represent the team of architects whose collaboration created the MAP Studio (Magnani Pelzel Associated Architects) in 2004, an international office based in Venice, Italy. The studio carries out projects related to architecture, urbanism and design. The two architects have received awards for their work, including the XXXI Premio Torta in October 2011 for the restoration of the Porta Nuova Tower ( link ) and an honourable mention during the Piran Days of Architecture in Slovenia in November 2011, for a project conducted in Venice, they won Italian Architect Award 2018 ( link) and then in the 2023 the first edition of Emilia Romagna Architecture Award( link).

== Building ==
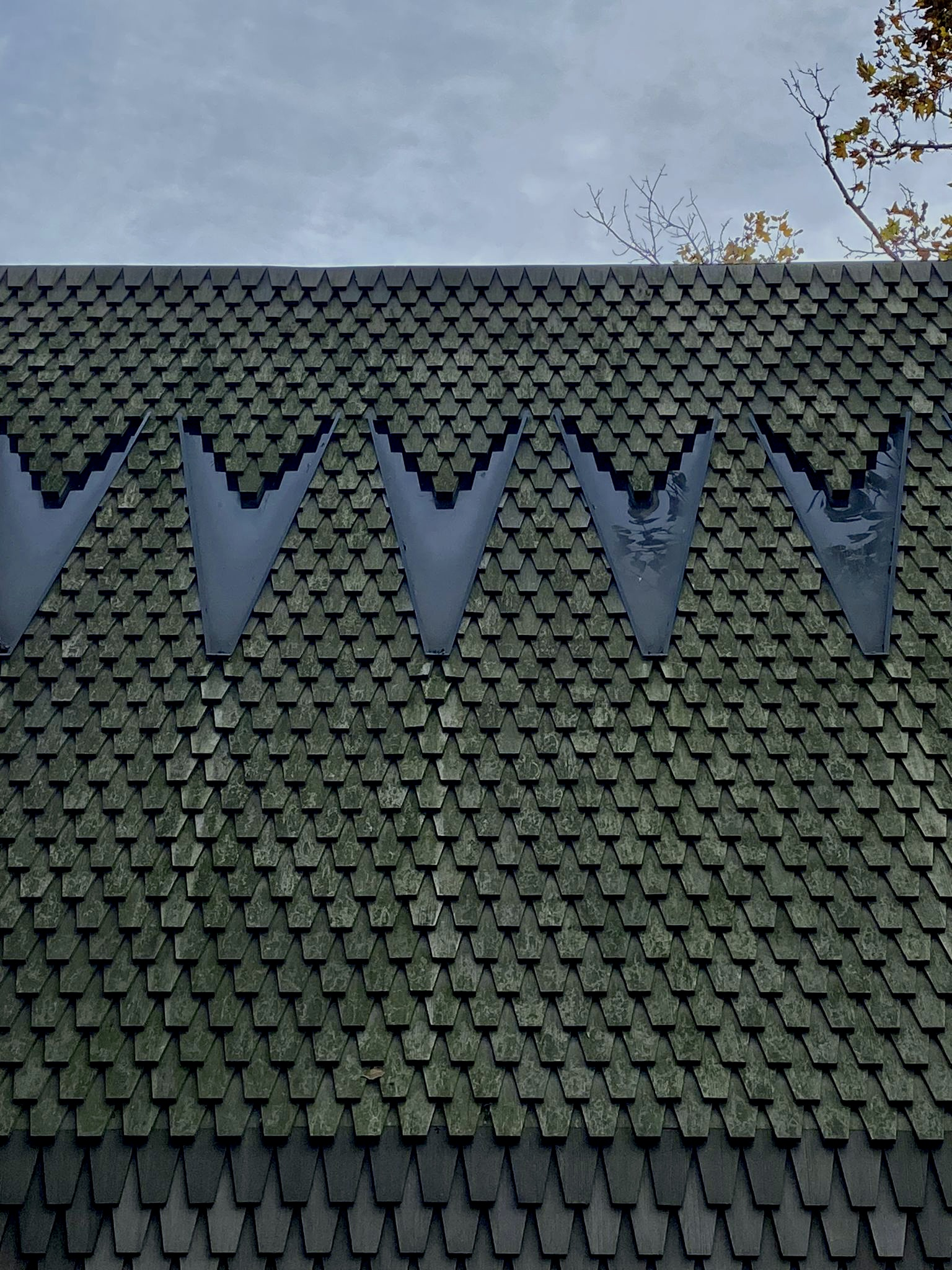
Disposition of the shingles on the Asplund Pavilion, San Giorgio Maggiore, 2023

The architecture of the Asplund Pavilion was inspired by Stavkirken, a medieval wooden Christian church building from Scandinavia. The Asplund Pavilion is approximately 11 meters long and 8 meters high, and it is supported by 11 lamellar wood portals that define 10 bays. It presents a pitched roof which emphasizes its height, characterized by continuous wood cladding made of 9000 wooden shingles, interrupted by the presence of a series of symmetrical triangular skylights placed on both sides.

Shingle Measurements
Object	cm/in
Height	35 centimetres (14 in)
Top length	15 centimetres (5.9 in)
Bottom length	7.5 centimetres (3.0 in)
Top width	0.5 centimetres (0.20 in)
Bottom width	2 centimetres (0.79 in)

=== Materials ===
For this project the company Alpi developed an experimental and unique material for the external part, which had to be waterproof and able to maintain its appearance over time. The exteriors of the building are entirely made of dark gray shingles, positioned like "dragon's skin", featuring the Xilo 2.0 Planked Gray wood pattern. Wood of the Xilo 2.0 Striped White collection was used to cover all internal surfaces.

== Style of the building ==
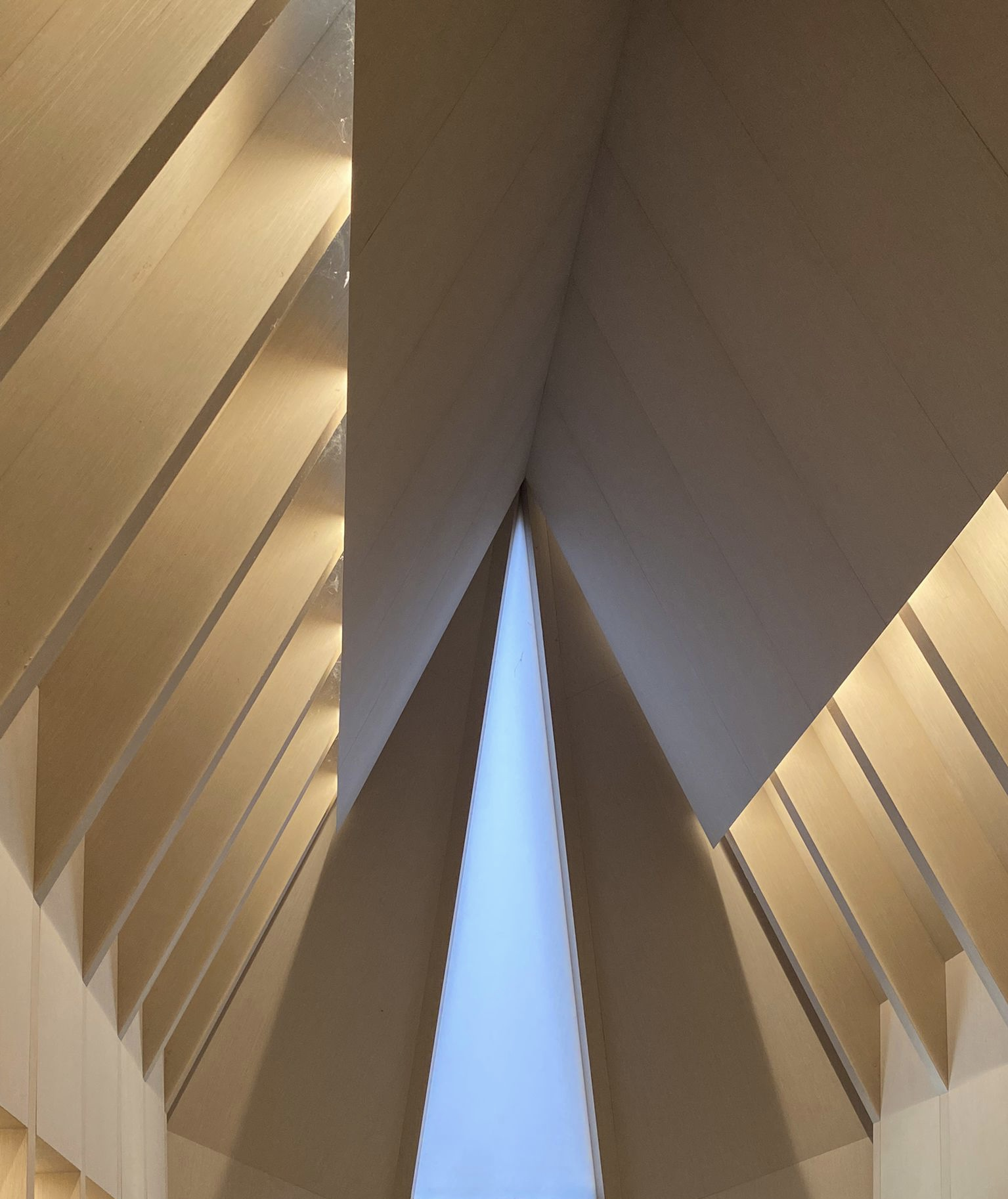
Skylight in the Asplund Pavilion, San Giorgio Maggiore, 2023

The Asplund Pavilion belongs to the archetype of the hut which consists of three main elements: standalone columns, horizontal beams forming the entablature, and a basic pediment marking the triangular end of a pitched roof. The chapel encompasses the stereometry of the supporting structures crafted by Asplund and Lewerntz for the Stockholm cemetery, drawing inspiration from Nordic woodwork.

The design attempts to create a domestic absolute, intertwining themes of shelter in nature and a reinterpreted vernacular architecture. The materials used were chosen to create a natural look to the exterior of the building, based on Asplund's original concept. The interior was designed to create a calm and tranquil atmosphere. The Pavilion incorporates shapes and colors from nature, and design elements incorporated to make a strong visual impression. The external shingles feature a dark wooden material, which creates a contrast with the light wood used for the internal cladding. The external pattern creates an intricate microstructure by playing with the light and shadow contrasts, alluding to the multitude of the Nordic forest.

== Art Collection ==
The internal space of the Pavilion features an exhibition presenting replica drawings, texts, photographs and scale models referring to the original "Woodland Chapel". The exhibits are provided by the Canadian Centre for Architecture in Montreal and the Swedish Centre for Architecture and Design of Stockholm. The display supplies insight of the development behind both the internal and external spaces of the building, with sketches, black and white drawings and photographs. The materials used include graphite, coloured pencils, pen and black ink and were created between 1918 and 1921.

List of artworks in the Asplund Pavilion exhibition
Title	Type	Supplies	Dimensions	Perspective
Interior sketch perspective for Woodland Chapel showing the altar and catafalque	Drawing	Graphite	23.5 centimetres (9.3 in) x 29.5 centimetres (11.6 in)	Internal
Interior perspective for Woodland Chapel showing the altar and catafalque	Drawing	Graphite and coloured pencil	11.6 centimetres (4.6 in) x 16.8 centimetres (6.6 in)	Internal
Exterior perspective for Woodland Chapel showing the loggia and wrought iron gate inside the main entrance	Drawing	Graphite, grey and green coloured pencil	28.6 centimetres (11.3 in) x 32.5 centimetres (12.8 in)	External
Exterior perspective for the wrought iron gate inside the main entrance of Woodland Chapel	Drawing	Graphite, yellow and green coloured pencil	22.5 centimetres (8.9 in) x 20 centimetres (7.9 in)	External
Elevation for a detail showing a skull and crossbones with serpents for the wrought iron gate inside the main entrance of Woodland Chapel	Drawing	Graphite, pen and black ink	44.2 centimetres (17.4 in) x 61.2 centimetres (24.1 in)	External
Interior perspective for Woodland Chapel showing the altar and catafalque	Drawing	Graphite, coloured pencil, pen and black ink	23.7 centimetres (9.3 in) x 32.2 centimetres (12.7 in)	Internal
Interior view of Woodland Chapel showing the altar and chairs	Photograph	Gelatin silver print	16.7 centimetres (6.6 in)x 23 centimetres (9.1 in)	Internal

== See also ==
- Holy See
- San Giorgio Maggiore (Church)
- Wood shingle
- Hut
