= Royal Festival Hall =

Multi-purpose venue in the city of London, England

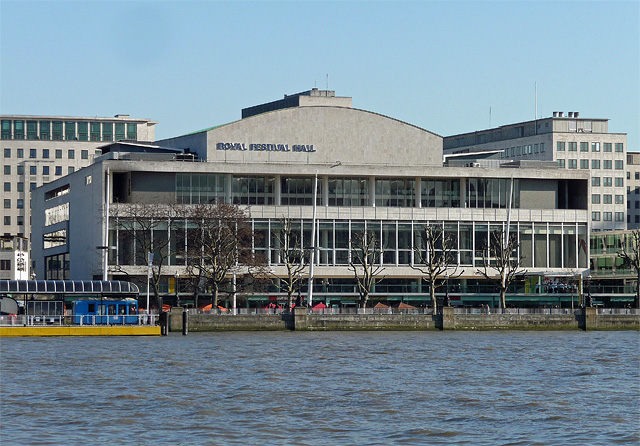
- View from Embankment
- Interactive map of the Royal Festival Hall area

General information
- Type: Concert hall
- Architectural style: Modernist
- Location: Belvedere Road; London, SE1; England
- Coordinates: 51°30′21.01″N 00°07′00.44″W
- Construction started: 1948 (18 months to complete)
- Inaugurated: 3 May 1951
- Renovated: 2005–2007
- Cost: £2 million (1951)
- Renovation cost: £111 million (2007)
- Client: London County Council
- Owner: London County Council (1951–1965); Greater London Council (1965–1986); Arts Council (1986–1988); Southbank Centre Limited (1988–present)

Design and construction
- Architects: Robert Matthew and Leslie Martin
- Other designers: Robin Day (furniture including surviving auditorium seating), Peter Moro, Trevor Dannatt
- Main contractor: Holland, Hannen & Cubitts

Other information
- Seating capacity: 2,700

Website
- southbankcentre.co.uk

The Royal Festival Hall is a 2,700-seat concert, dance and talks venue within Southbank Centre in London, England. It is situated on the South Bank of the River Thames, not far from Hungerford Bridge, in the London Borough of Lambeth. It is a Grade I listed building, the first post-war building to become so protected (in 1981). The London Philharmonic Orchestra, the Philharmonia Orchestra, the Orchestra of the Age of Enlightenment, the London Sinfonietta, Chineke! and Aurora are resident orchestras at Southbank Centre.

The hall was built as part of the Festival of Britain for London County Council, and was officially opened on 3 May 1951. When the LCC's successor, the Greater London Council, was abolished in 1986, the Festival Hall was taken over by the Arts Council, and managed together with the Queen Elizabeth Hall and Purcell Room (opened 1967) and the Hayward Gallery (1968), eventually becoming an independent arts organisation, now known as the Southbank Centre, in April 1998.

The complex includes several reception rooms, bars and restaurants, and the Clore Ballroom, accommodating up to 440 for a seated dinner. A large head and shoulders bust of Nelson Mandela (by Ian Walters, created in 1985) stands on the walkway between the hall and Hungerford Bridge approach viaduct. The sculpture was originally made of fibreglass until re-cast in bronze.

The complex's variety of open spaces and foyers are popular for social or work-related meetings.

The closest tube stations are Waterloo and, across the river via the Jubilee Bridges, Embankment and Charing Cross.

== The original building ==
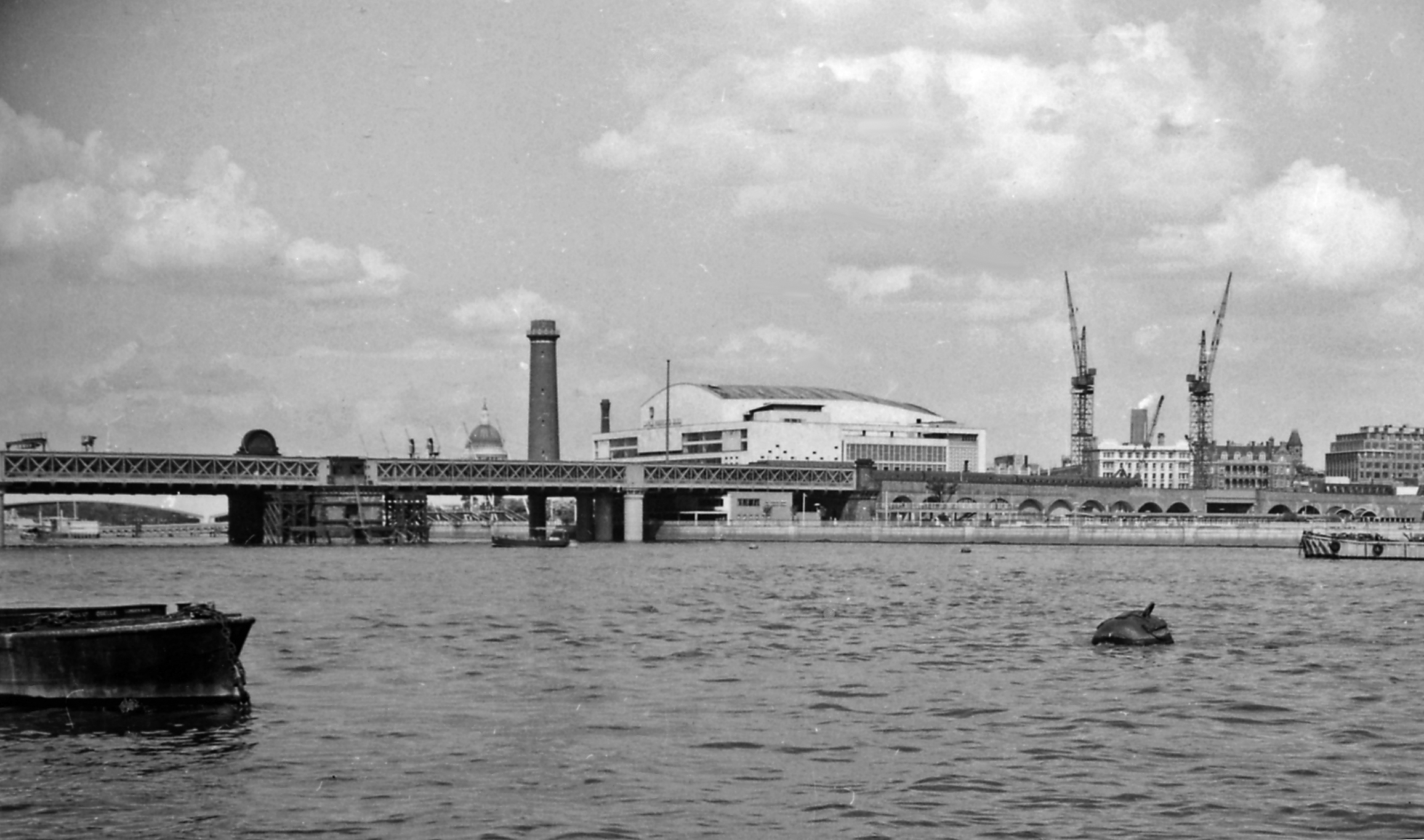
View to the south from Westminster Pier, 1958

The Festival Hall project was led by London County Council's then chief architect, Robert Matthew, who gathered around him a young team of talented designers including Leslie Martin, who was eventually to lead the project with Edwin Williams and Peter Moro, along with the furniture designer Robin Day and his wife, the textile designer Lucienne Day. The acoustical consultant was Hope Bagenal, working with members of the Building Research Station; Henry Humphreys, Peter Parkin and William Allen. Martin was 39 at the time, and very taken with the Nordic activities of Alvar Aalto and Gunnar Asplund.

The figure who really drove the project forward was Herbert Morrison, a Labour Party politician. It was he who had insisted that Matthew had Martin as his deputy architect, treating the Festival Hall as a special project.

=== Architecture ===
A 1948 sketch by Martin shows the design of the concert hall as the egg in a box. But the strength of the design was the arrangement of interior space: the central staircase has a ceremonial feel and moves elegantly through the different levels of light and air.

They were concerned that whilst the scale of the project demanded a monumental building, it should not ape the triumphal classicism of many earlier public buildings. The wide open foyers, with bars and restaurants, were intended to be meeting places for all: there were to be no separate bars for different classes of patron. Because these public spaces were built around the auditorium, they also had the effect of insulating the Hall from the noise of the adjacent railway bridge.

To quote Leslie Martin: "The suspended auditorium provides the building with its major attributes: the great sense of space that is opened out within the building, the flowing circulation from the symmetrically placed staircases and galleries that became known as the 'egg in the box'."

The hall they built used modernism's favourite material, reinforced concrete, alongside more luxurious elements including beautiful woods and Derbyshire fossilised limestone. The exterior of the building was bright white, intended to contrast with the blackened city surrounding it. Large areas of glass on its façade meant that light coursed freely throughout the interior, and at night, the glass let the light from inside flood out onto the river, in contrast to the darkness that befell the rest of London after dusk.

The hall originally seated 2,901. The cantilevered boxes are often described as looking like drawers pulled out in a hurried burglary, but none has a compromised sightline. The ceiling was wilfully sculptural, a conceit at the very edge of building technology and, as it turns out, way beyond the contemporary understanding of acoustics. Robin Day, who designed the furniture for the auditorium, used a clearly articulated structure in his designs of bent plywood and steel.

The original building had lushly planted roof terraces; the Level Two foyer café had been able to spill out onto the terraces looking out on the river, and original entrances were positioned on the sides of the building, enabling visitors to arrive directly at the stairs leading to the auditorium.

The foundation stone was laid in 1949 by Prime Minister Clement Attlee on the site of the former Lion Brewery, built in 1837. The building was constructed by Holland, Hannen & Cubitts at a cost of £2 million and officially opened on 3 May 1951 with a gala concert attended by King George VI and Queen Elizabeth, conducted by Sir Malcolm Sargent and Sir Adrian Boult. The first general manager was T. E. Bean, who had previously managed the Hallé Orchestra.

"I was overwhelmed by a shock of breathless delight at the originality and beauty of the interior. It felt as if I had been instantly transported far into the future and that I was on another planet," said journalist Bernard Levin of his first impressions of the building.

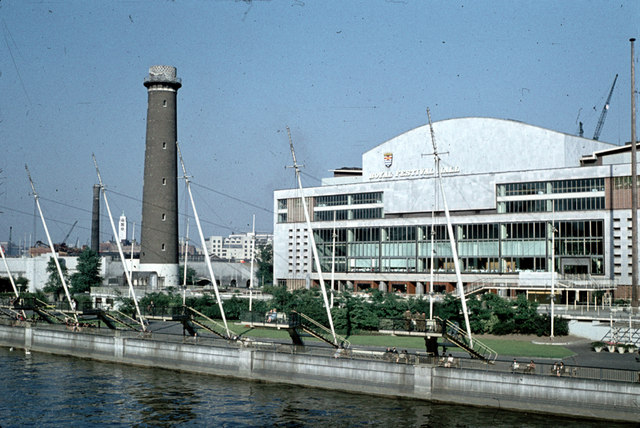
Royal Festival Hall and Shot Tower, 1959

=== Organ ===
The 7,866 pipe organ was built during 1950–1954 by Harrison & Harrison in Durham, to the specification of the London County Council's consultant, Ralph Downes, who also supervised the tonal finishing. It was designed as a well-balanced classical instrument embracing a number of rich and varied ensembles, which alone or in combination could equal the dynamic scale of any orchestra or choral grouping, in addition to coping with the entire solo repertoire.

The design principles enshrined in its construction gave rise to a whole new school of organ building, known as the English Organ Reform Movement, influencing in the UK alone the cathedral organs of Coventry and Blackburn and the concert hall organs of the Fairfield Halls, Croydon, and the Bridgewater Hall, Manchester: there are also innumerable organs in other countries that have been influenced by it.

However, the design of the organ in its housing made maintenance difficult, and by 2000 it had become unusable. It was consequently completely removed before restoration of the Hall itself began in 2005, and after restoration and updating by Harrison & Harrison, a third of the organ was reinstalled. The remainder was reinstalled between 2012 and 2013, and voicing completed in 2014.

=== Acoustics ===
The Festival Hall was one of the first concert halls in the world to be built using the application of scientific principles, both theoretical and experimental. Hope Bagenal and his colleagues from the Building Research Station formed an integral part of the design team. The acoustic behaviour of the seats was measured and tested in a laboratory to enable more exacting design. Careful consideration of external noise problems was undertaken.

Following the opening of the hall, there was some criticism of certain aspects of the acoustics. This was partially attributable to the fact that some of the original specifications for room surfaces determined by the acoustic consultants were ignored in the building process. A specific problem for performers was the difficulty of hearing each other on the platform. Both the angled "blast" side walls and the plywood reflectors projected sound away from the stage.

The general consensus was that the hall was "too dry", not reverberant enough, particularly at low frequencies, and that the bass tone was weak. The definition was "excellent" for chamber and modern music, but the hall was not as effective for music of the late Classical or Romantic period. Sir John Barbirolli commented, "Everything is sharp and clear and there is no impact, no fullness on the climaxes."

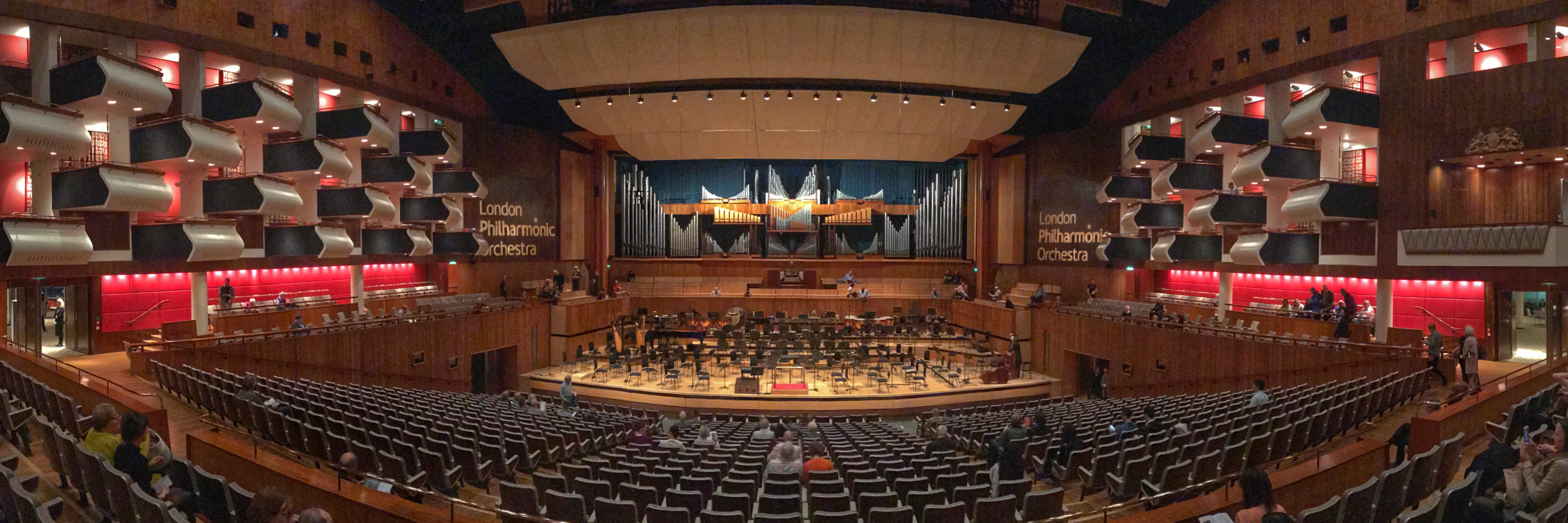
Hall Interior

=== Heating systems ===
A water source heat pump was used to heat the building in the winter and cool the building in the summer. Water was extracted from the River Thames below Hungerford Bridge using a centrifugal pump. Heat was extracted from the river water using a heat pump. The compressors were driven by two Rolls-Royce Merlin engines, adapted to run on town gas. It was highly successful, providing both heating and cooling for the Hall, but over-sized, and was sold off after the Festival of Britain.

== The 1964 alterations ==
As a structure, the new Festival Hall was technically stretched, and maintenance was soon required. The building was substantially altered in 1964 by adding the foyers and terraces to the river side of the building, extending the footprint by 30 ft, and more dressing rooms to the rear. Alterations to the façades overlooking the river removed the decorative tiles, altering the Scandinavian Modernism of the building's primary public face in favour of a plainer and hard-edged style. The building's original entrance sequence was much compromised by these changes and the later additions of raised concrete walkways around the building to serve the neighbouring Queen Elizabeth Hall, Purcell Room and The Hayward, built in 1967/8.

=== Assisted resonance ===
Leo Beranek, an American acoustics engineer who had undertaken measurements of all of the world's leading concert halls, had identified that the interior treatment of the auditorium was absorbing too much sound. By 1962 the authorities, after prolonged experiment, had become convinced that no improvement in the hall's reverberation could be achieved by any further treatment of its surfaces. Longer reverberation would require modification to the main structure, reducing the seating capacity and the provision of a new ceiling. This was considered too costly, particularly as any hypothetical gain in "warmth" or "resonance" might well be by the sacrifice of other positive qualities for which the Hall was generally esteemed, for example, its clarity, its comparative uniformity of acoustic response and its freedom from echo.

It was known that the ancient Greeks had developed the technique of using vases built into their auditoria, which added resonance to strengthen tone or improve its quality, though the effect was very weak. The Building Research Station developed an electronic method of lengthening the reverberation time by a system called "assisted resonance", in which some of the acoustical energy lost to the surfaces of the hall was replaced by acoustical energy supplied by a loudspeaker. Each microphone and its associated loudspeaker was limited to the one frequency by placing the microphone inside a Helmholtz resonator fitted into the ceiling in a range of sizes that resonated over a wide range of the low frequencies, which critics and musicians thought did not adequately reverberate in the hall. 172 channels were used to cover a frequency range of 58 Hz to 700 Hz, increasing reverberation time from 1.4 to 2.5 s in the 125 Hz octave band. However, the system never fully solved the problem, and as it aged it became unreliable, occasionally emitting odd sounds during performances. It was switched off in 1998, which returned the acoustics to their poor state, so bad that they make performers who play in it "lose the will to live", according to Sir Simon Rattle.

== The 2007 renovation ==
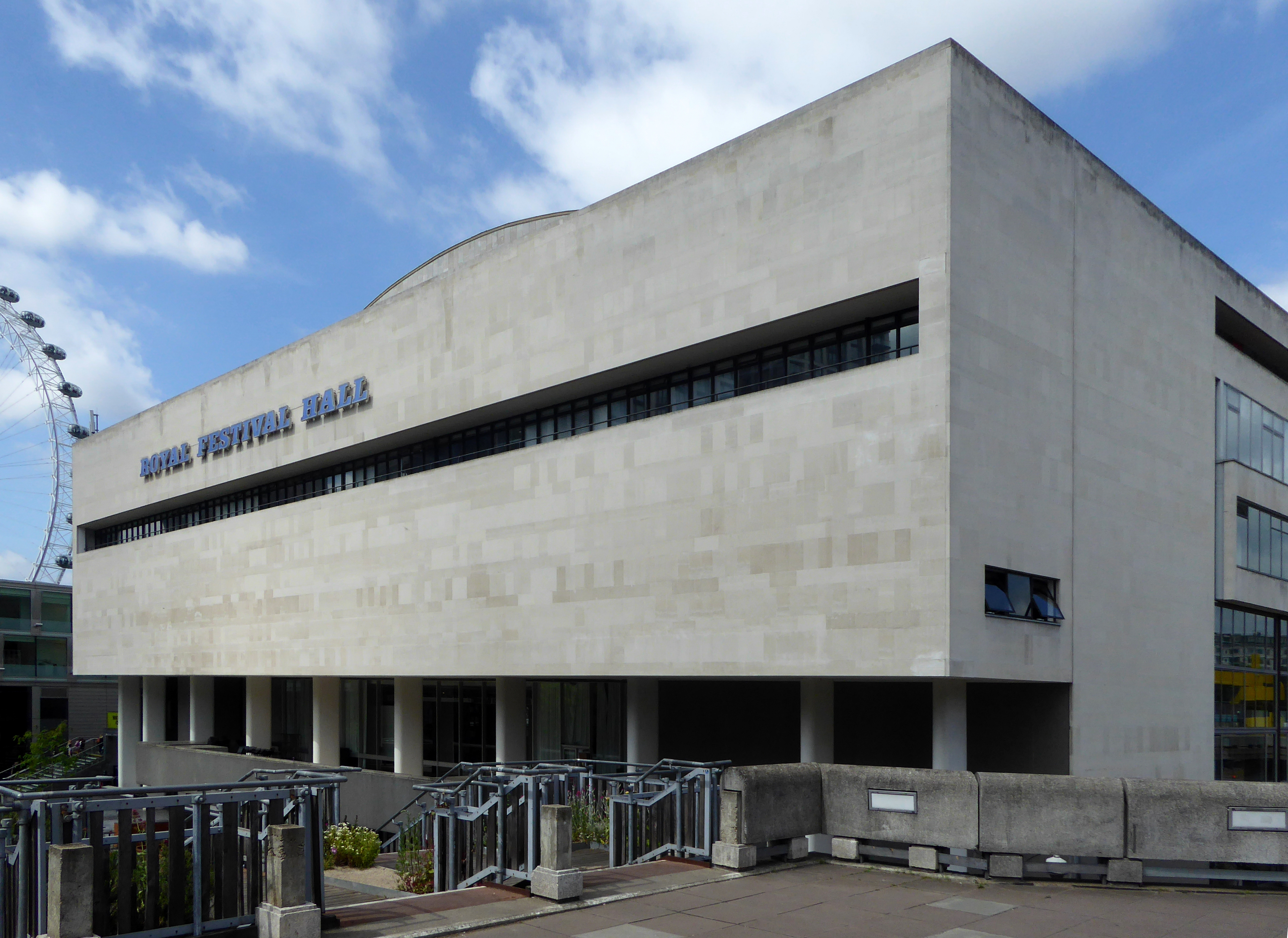
The Hall's southern side

The building underwent a substantial renovation between 2005 and 2007 aimed at improving the poor acoustics and building layout, led by architect Diane Haigh of Allies and Morrison with consulting engineer firms Max Fordham LLP (M&E) and Price & Myers (structural). The interior of the concert hall space was almost entirely intact until this re-modelling, which saw its stage canopy and walls rebuilt in plainer more rectangular forms. Seating was reduced slightly to 2,788, including the choir seating. This was carried out in the face of opposition from conservationists, led by the Twentieth Century Society.

On the advice of acoustics firm, Kirkegaard Associates, the lack of reverberation and the difficult performance conditions for musicians were corrected by changes in the fabric of the auditorium. Surfaces that had previously absorbed sound were transformed to support and sustain that sound. The tapestries on the back walls of the boxes were gathered up to increase reverberation, but can be redeployed, together with additional absorbent blinds above the stage and around the Hall whenever needed. The wooden wall panels of the Hall were relined to change their acoustic qualities and the undulating plaster ceiling panels were completely reconstructed using more robust materials to provide greater warmth of sound and support for bass frequencies.

New adjustable acoustic canopies were placed over the stage's width to allow bass frequencies to resonate in the space above the stage, and for treble frequencies to be reflected back to improve feedback to performers. The stage was reconfigured to provide more space for performers, and the arrangement of walls around the stage was altered significantly. The original Robin Day designed seats were restored and reupholstered to make them more comfortable, and more acoustically appropriate.

The major refurbishment presented an opportunity to add to the infrastructure of the venue to make the process of "get-in" and "get-out" in a single day easier, and to add to the flexibility of the venue. Theatre consultants Carr & Angier worked with ISG Interior Exterior and Stage Technologies to create a new working space over the stage area with four large movable lighting bridges, capable of load sharing to lift large touring productions without the need for custom rigging. Delstar Engineering supplied 11 lifts to form the stage platform. These allow the stage layout to be reconfigured in many ways to suit the nature of the performance taking place. The choir benches can now be wheeled out to provide a level floor for staged and dance performances. The space between seat rows has been extended by 75mm by rebuilding the concrete floor of the stalls, with a loss of only 118 seats. Cooling has been introduced by reversing the airflow in the auditorium.

During the 2000s, a building comprising seven commercial units was erected opposite the western side of the hall, with many of the Southbank administrative offices above. Shops and restaurants were added along the river frontage.

The venue officially reopened to the public in June 2007. The refurbishment was estimated to have cost in the region of £91 million. A film documenting the refurbishment, entitled This Is Tomorrow, was directed by Paul Kelly and produced by Andrew Hinton.

=== Organ refurbishment ===
The organ has been reconfigured to suit the new architectural and acoustic requirements: its depth has been reduced by 110 cm, but the basic principles of the layout have been respected.

Following a successful campaign to raise £2.3 million for a full restoration and reinstallation of the organ, the original organ builders, Harrison & Harrison, finally completed the reinstallation on 29 August 2013. Further work including re-balancing the pipework followed and was completed in time for the re-inauguration of the organ on 18 March 2014, exactly 60 years since it was first inaugurated. The first orchestral and organ concert was on 26 March 2014 and was recorded for the London Philharmonic Orchestra's own live label. The organ remains the third largest organ in Great Britain by number of pipes, with 7,866 pipes and 103 speaking stops. The organ is seldom played, either for recitals or to accompany orchestral concerts.

== Gallery ==
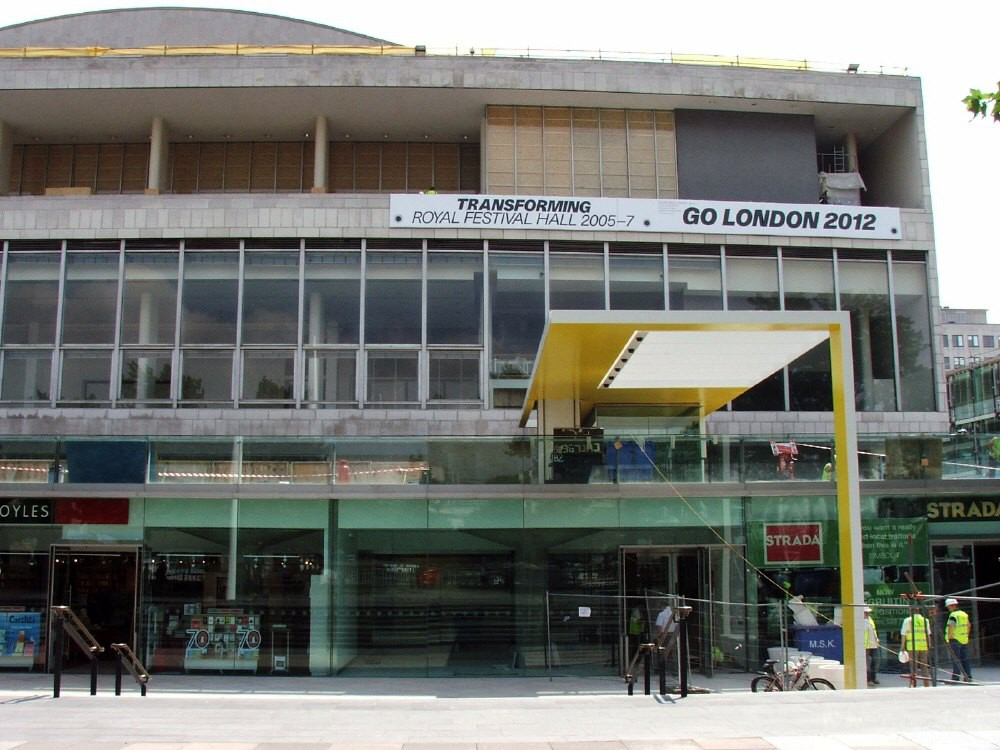
The Royal Festival Hall undergoing restoration work, July 2005

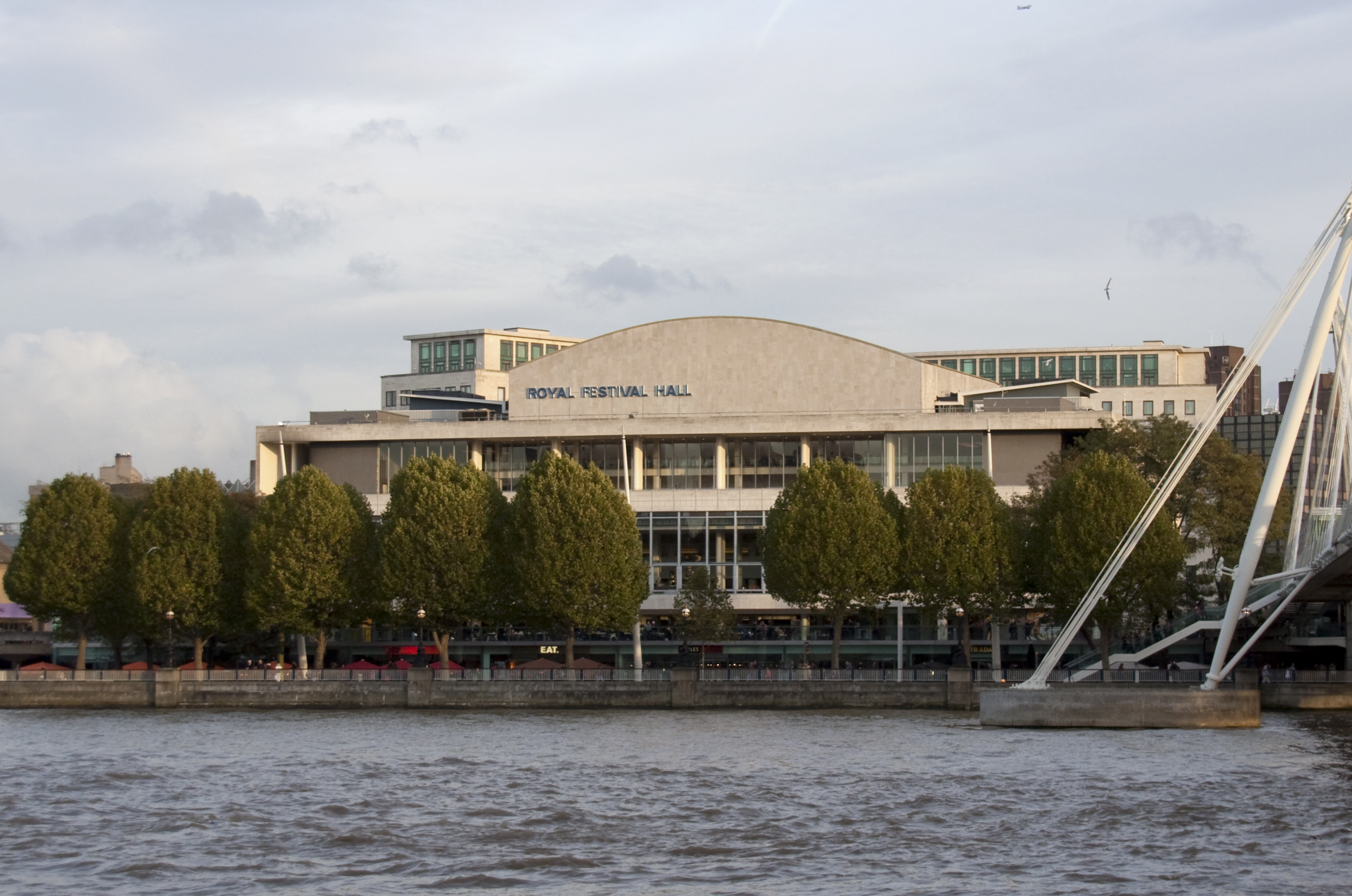
Seen from the River Thames, October 2010

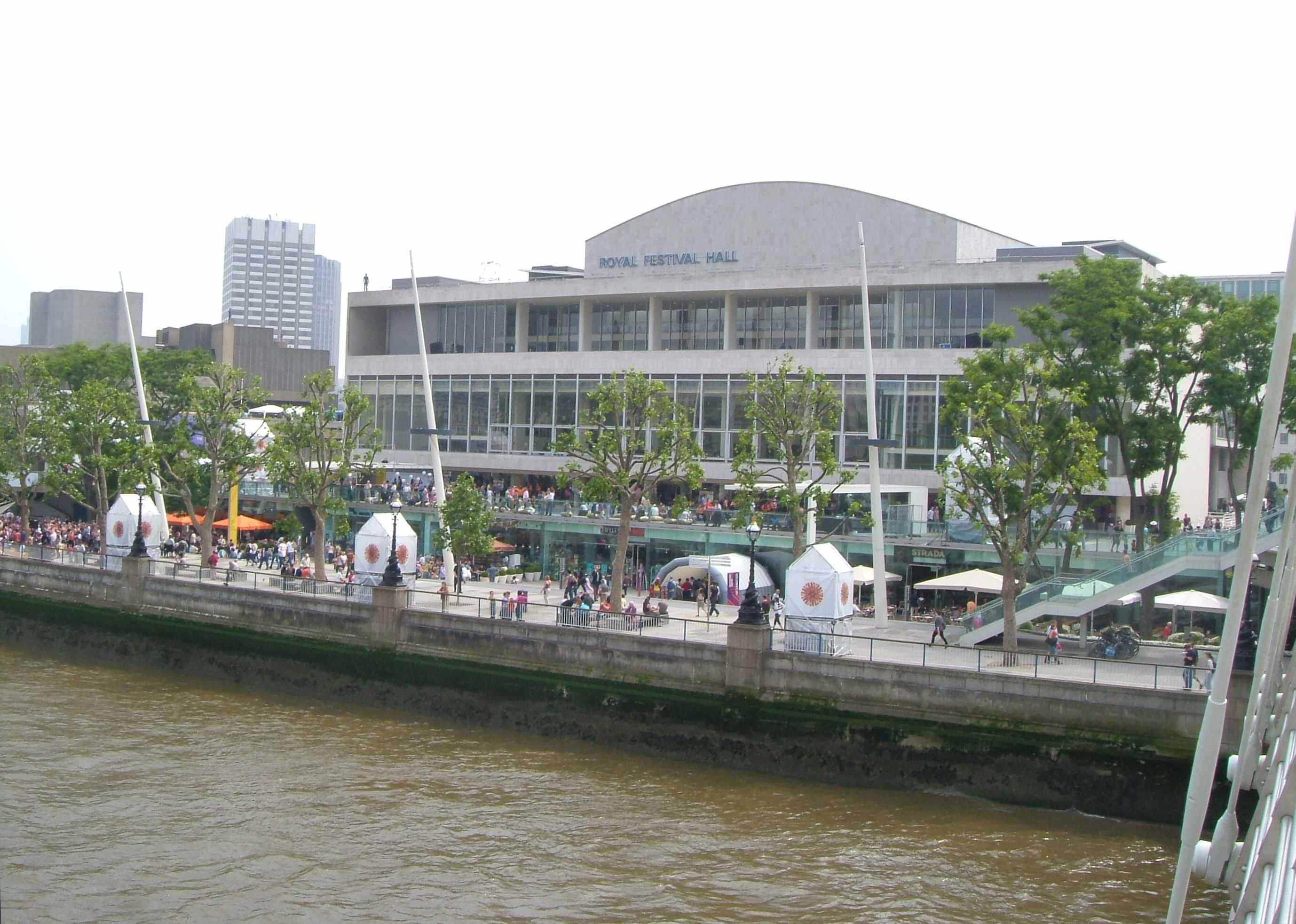
Seen from the Golden Jubilee Bridge, during reopening celebrations in June 2007

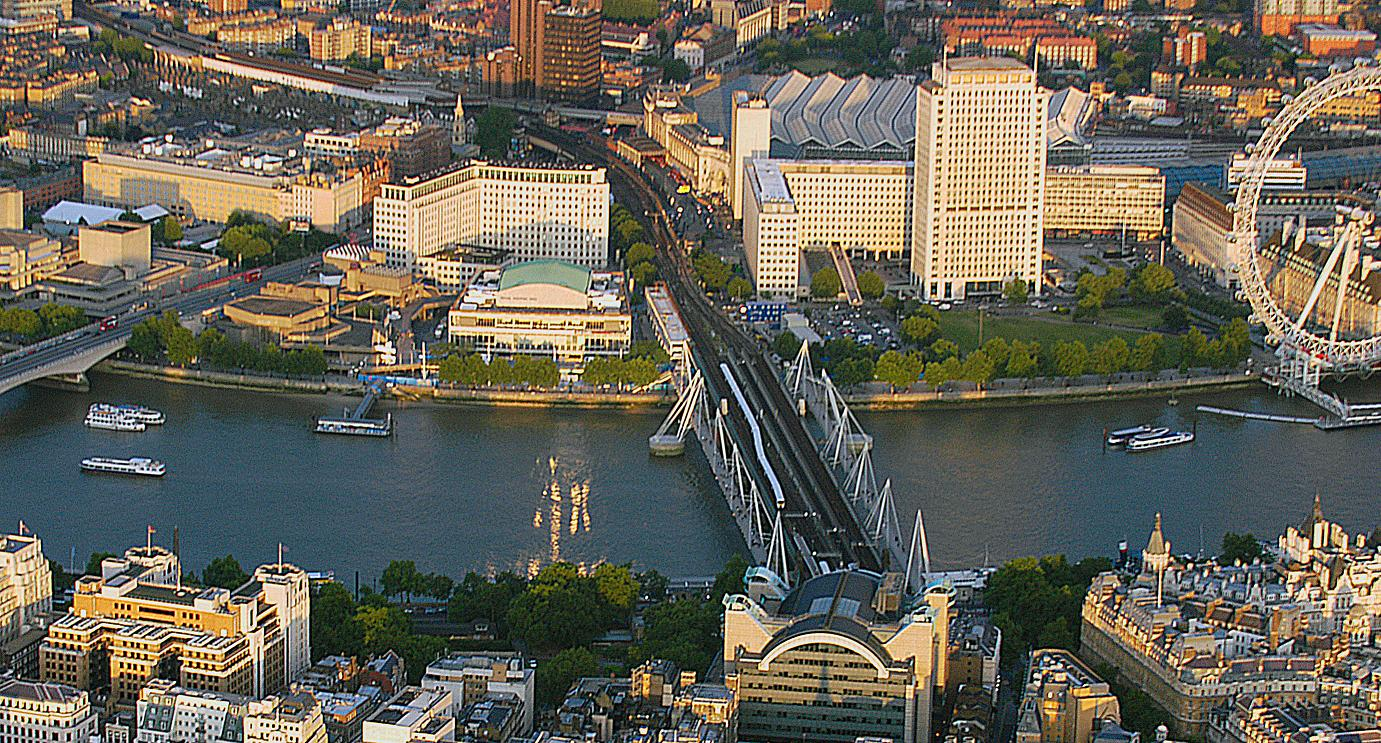
Southbank Centre aerial view (Royal Festival Hall in Centre), July 2007

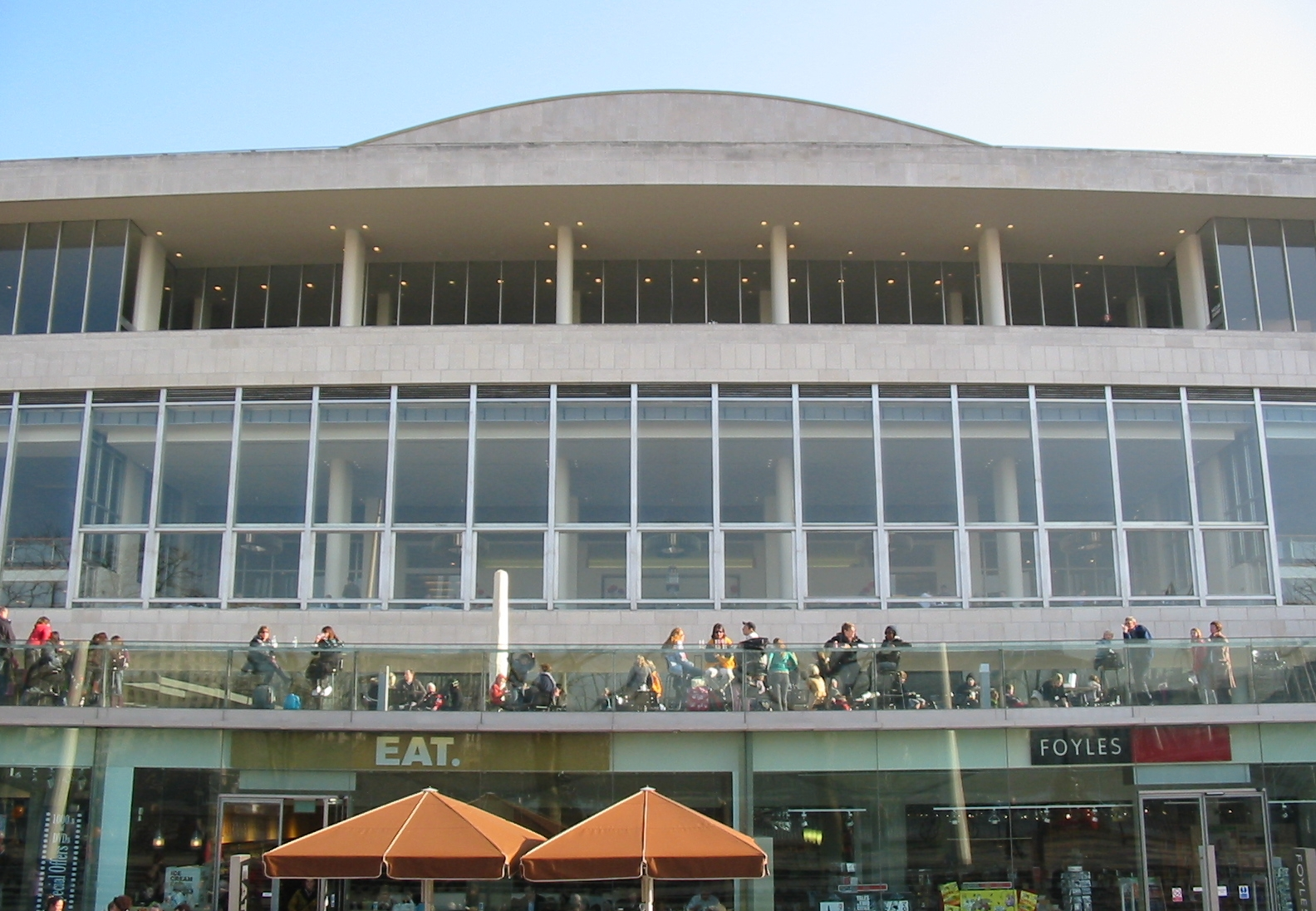
Royal Festival Hall terraces, February 2008

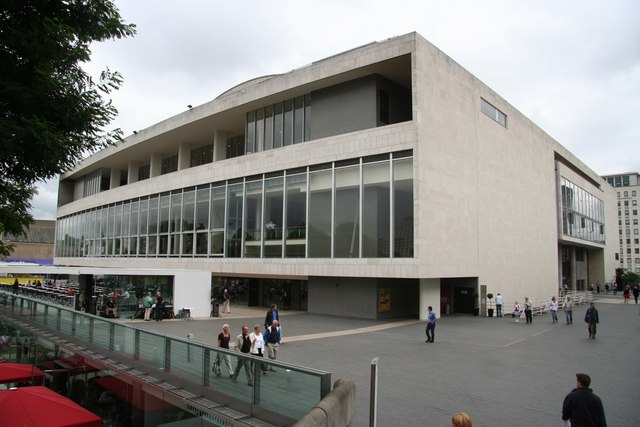
Westerly corner showing riverside facade, August 2008

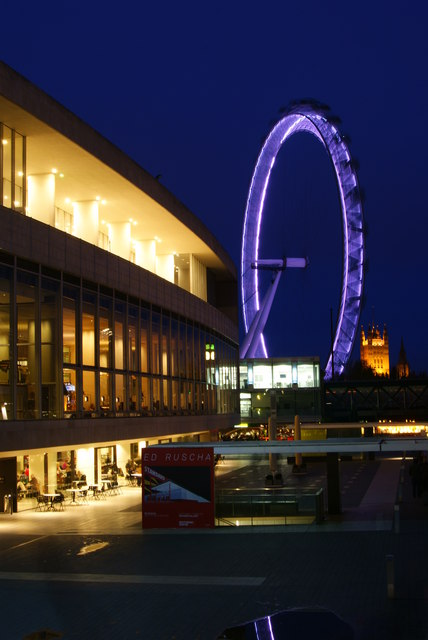
North-western facade at night with the London Eye and Palace of Westminster upriver, November 2009

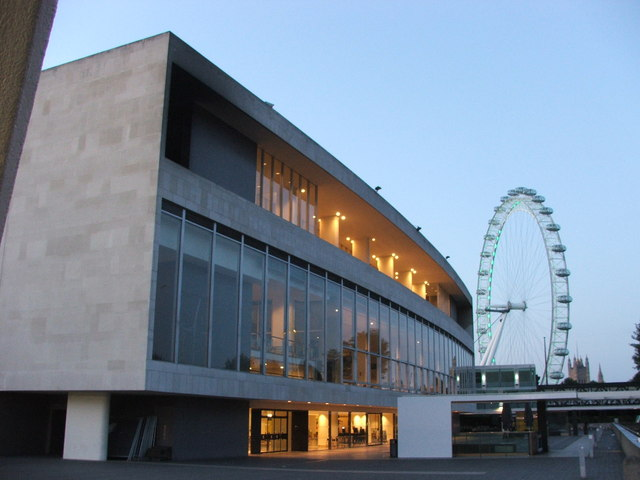
North-western facade at dusk with the London Eye and Palace of Westminster, October 2008

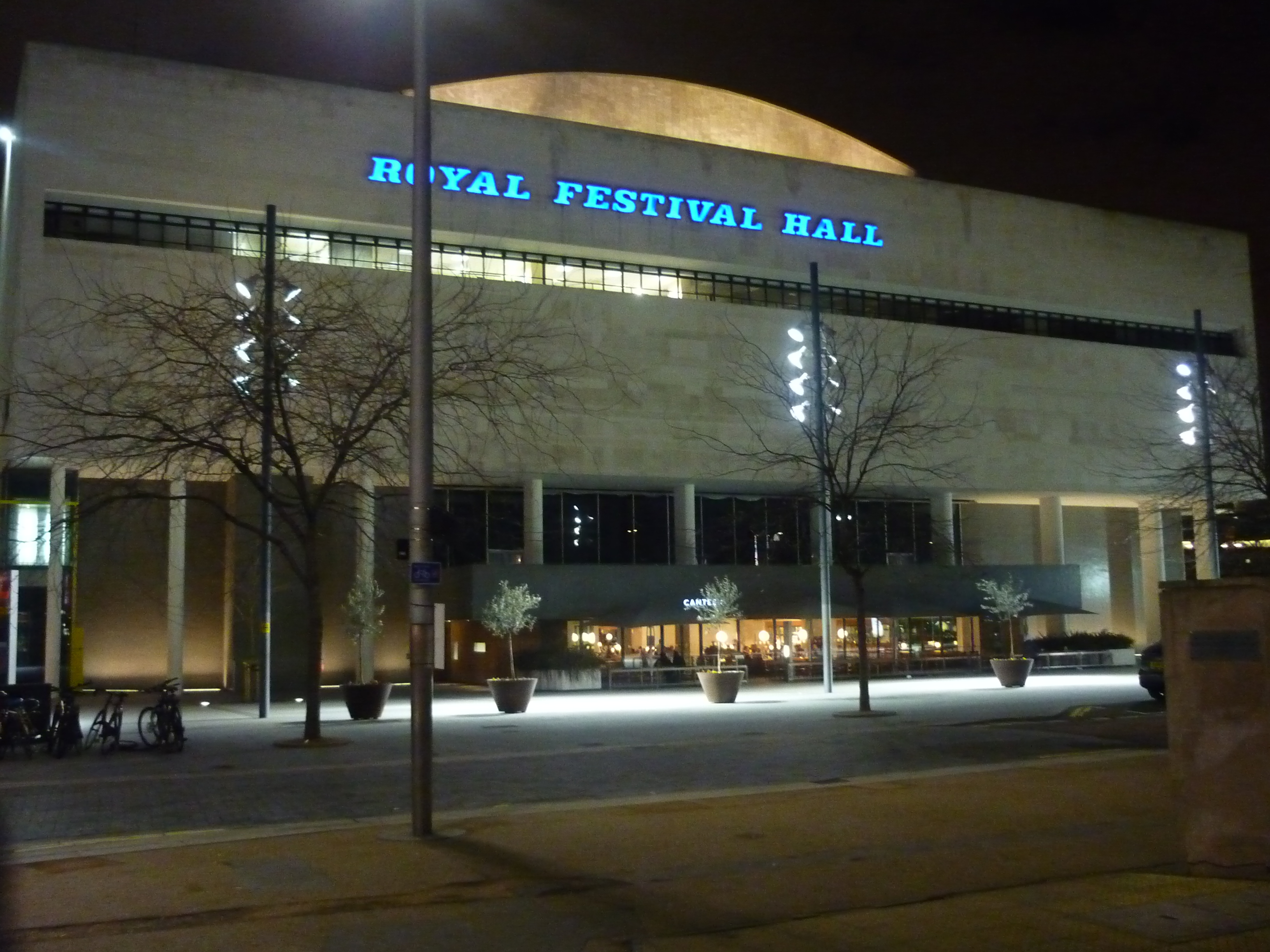
Rear facade at night seen from Concert Hall Approach, March 2010

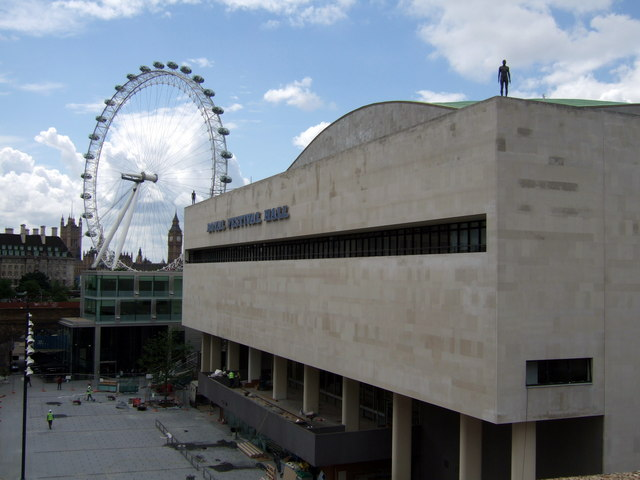
Rear facade from the Hayward Gallery during restoration, May 2007

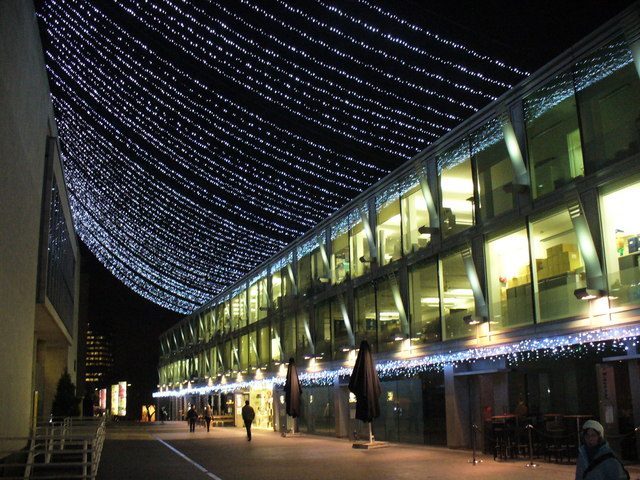
Illuminations over Festival Terrace, January 2010

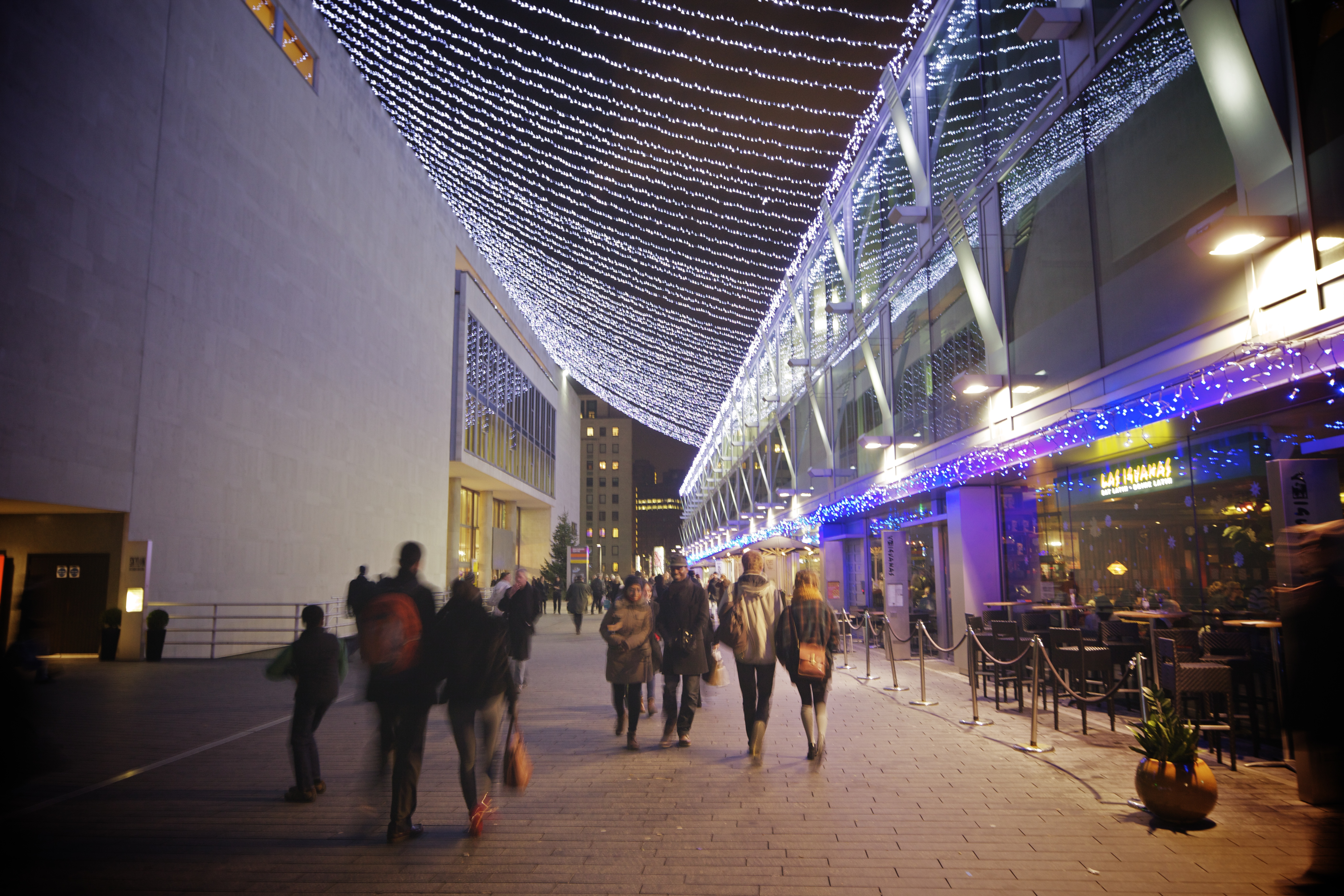
Illuminations over Festival Terrace, December 2010

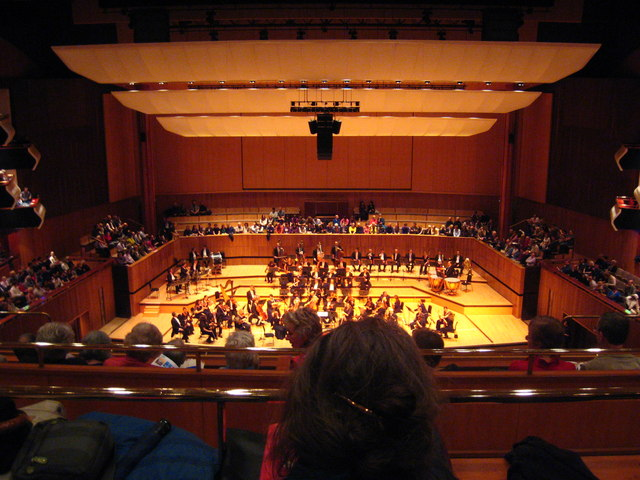
Inside the Concert Hall, November 2009

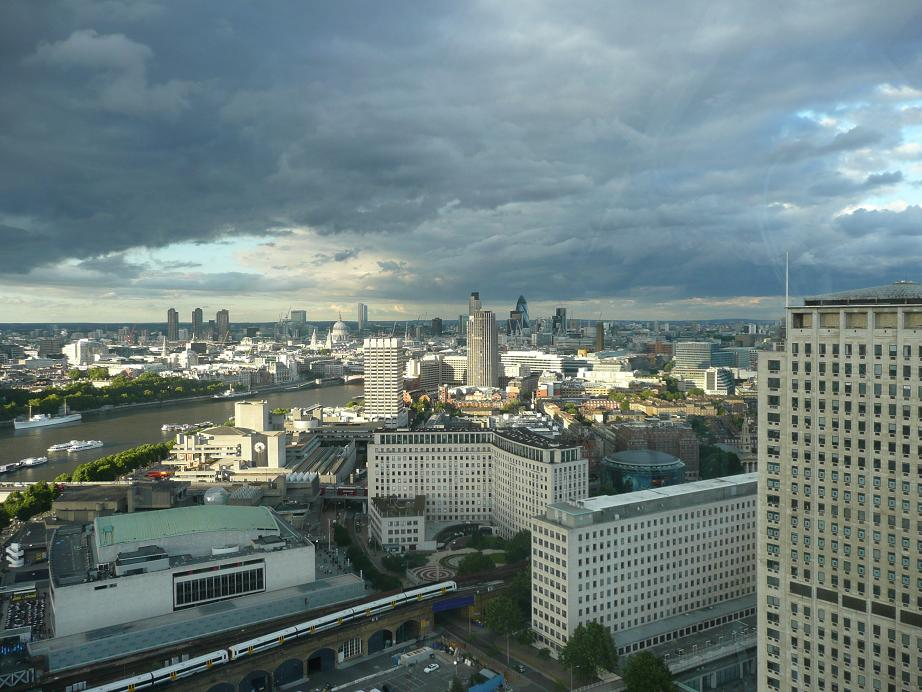
Royal Festival Hall (bottom left) from the London Eye, July 2008

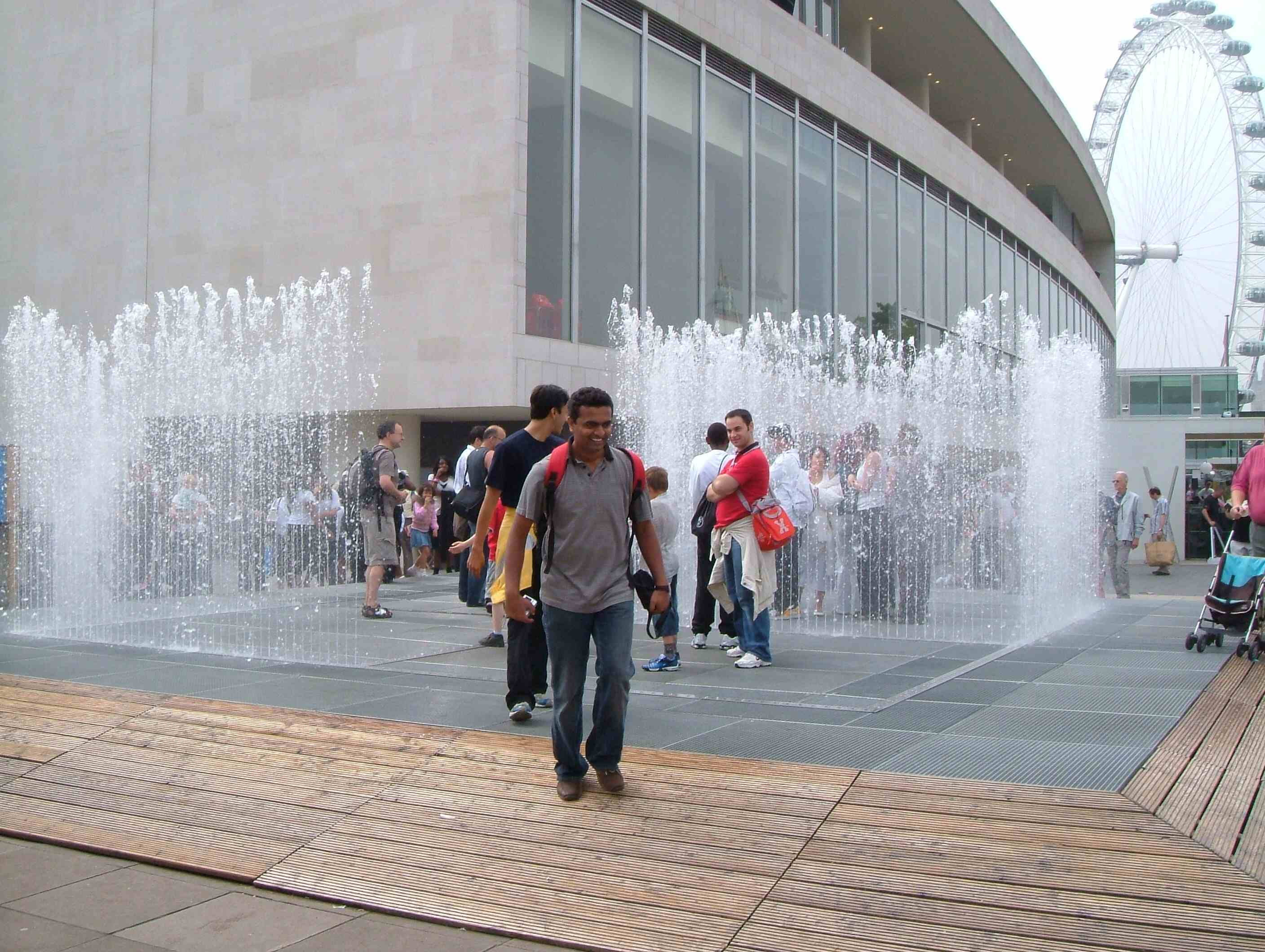
Walking through the Appearing Rooms fountain installation, by Danish artist Jeppe Hein, outside the RFH during reopening celebrations after 2007 refurbishment.

== Footnotes ==
Preceded by Palais des Festivals et des Congrès; Cannes	Eurovision Song Contest; Venue; 1960	Succeeded by Palais des Festivals et des Congrès; Cannes
