= Diane Haigh =

British architect (1949–2022)

- Born: Diane Margaret Haigh; 2 May 1949; Kendal, England
- Died: 31 July 2022 (aged 73); Cambridge, England
- Education: University of Cambridge
- Occupation: Architect
- Years active: 1982–2022
- Spouse: William Fawcett
- Children: 2

Diane Margaret Haigh (2 May 1949 – 31 July 2022) was a British architect and faculty member at the University of Cambridge. She designed the renovation of the Royal Festival Hall in 2007 as well as numerous other refurbishments of historical buildings.

== Early life ==
Haigh was born in 1949 in Kendal. Her father, Donald Haigh, was an architect. She studied architecture at Newnham College at the University of Cambridge, graduating in 1971, and later completed a postgraduate diploma at Cambridge's Darwin College. She married William Fawcett, a fellow architect whom she had met at Cambridge and with whom she often worked.

== Career ==
In 1982, Haigh, Fawcett and their two young children moved to Hong Kong, where Haigh taught at the University of Hong Kong Department of Architecture until 1985. They returned to Cambridge in 1986 and Haigh began working for Freeland Rees Roberts; her work there included the restoration of part of Thorpe Hall in Peterborough for use as a hospice. In the early 1990s, Haigh and Fawcett collaborated on the restoration of five houses designed by Baillie Scott in Cambridge, and published a book titled Baillie Scott: The Artistic House about the houses.

From 1995 to 2016, Haigh was the director of studies at Trinity Hall, Cambridge, and would spend her weekdays working in London and her weekends supervising students in Cambridge. She moved to the architectural firm Allies and Morrison in 1996 as a director and remained at the firm until 2016. At Allies and Morrison, she led projects including the refurbishment of Queen's House to meet modern accessibility standards (1999), the conversion of Baillie Scott's Blackwell house into an art gallery (2001), and refurbishment of the Royal Observatory's Astronomy Centre (2007) and the Royal Festival Hall (2007). Haigh's work on these historic buildings influenced the guidance of English Heritage—which had previously objected to her proposed designs—on the principles of conservation and restoration. She was appointed a director of design review at the Commission for Architecture and the Built Environment in 2007.

== Later life and death ==
Later in life Haigh had impaired mobility. She died from pancreatic cancer in Cambridge, on 31 July 2022, aged 73.
