= Villa Sturegården =

- Villa Sturegården
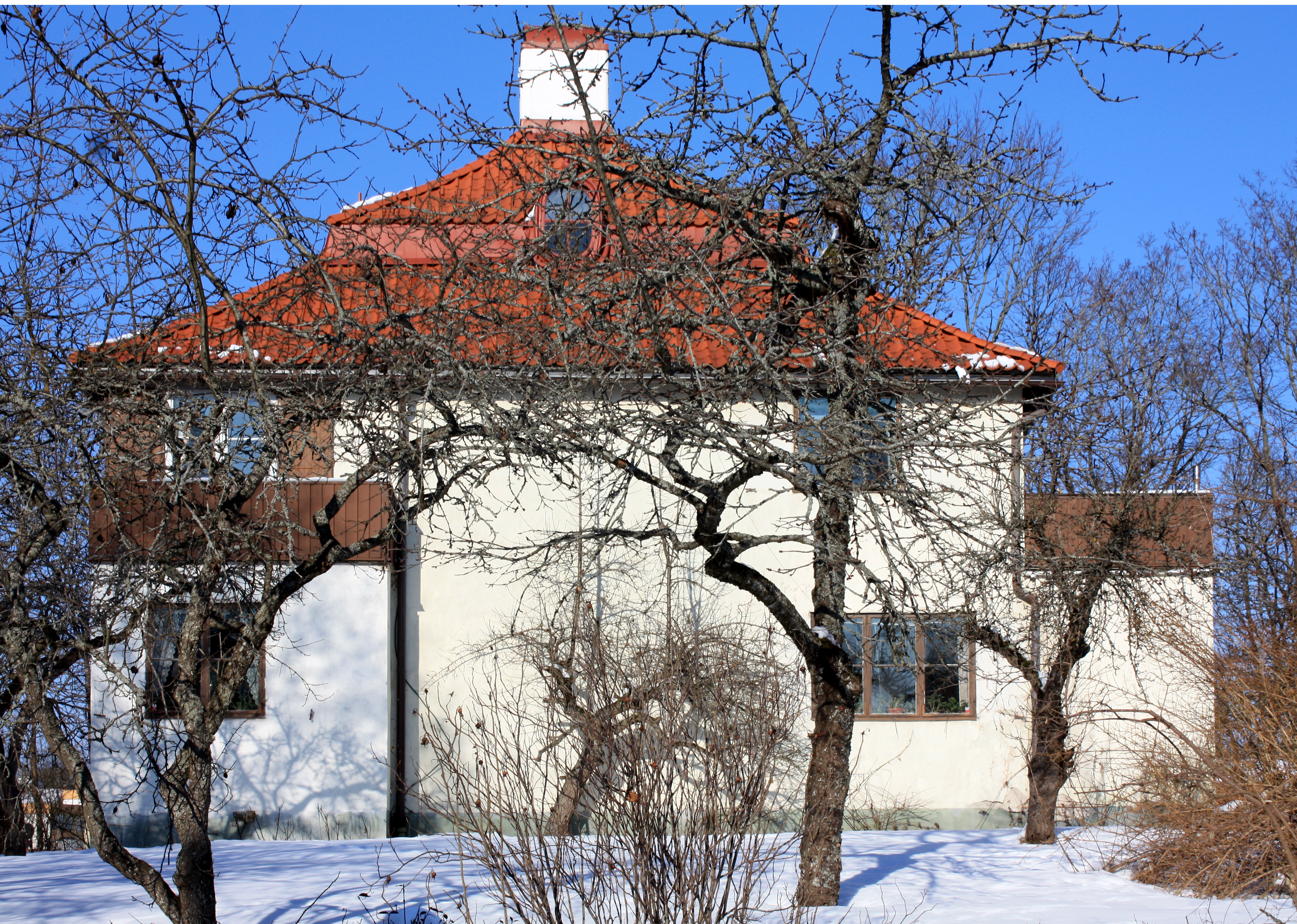
- Sturegarden House, February 2013

- Location within Sweden

General information
- Status: Completed
- Location: Nyköping, Sweden
- Coordinates: 58°45′26″N 17°01′23″E
- Completed: 1913
- Owner: Åstrand family

Design and construction
- Architect: Gunnar Asplund

Villa Sturegården is arguably the first completed project (1913) by architect Gunnar Asplund. It is a residential house located in the city of Nyköping, some 100 km south of Stockholm, Sweden.

The home was built for local bank manager Oscar Wichman. Wichman describes the project in his autobiographic Krönika (Chronicle): “A southward facing plot permitting an omni-directional view, located at the onset of Rosenkällavägen, caught our interest. The town offered it to us at a price of SEK 2:50 per square meter which included water and drainage drawn to the plot limits. The low price was motivated by the fact that I would be the first one to develop the property, acquired by the town from Rosenkälla estate. By recommendations from professor Ivar Tengbom I was put in contact with architect E G Asplund of Stockholm … He designed our new home and construction commenced at a rapid pace, so that we were able to move into Sturegarden House the Christmas week of 1913, the ground floor still lacking some work.“

The free-standing two story house is designed in a neoclassic style. The ground floor has the main entrance, entrance hall and main living and social areas as well as the kitchen with entrance and facilities. The first floor has the rooms for the parents, children, servant's rooms and appropriate facilities.

The interior, including masonry heaters, built-in cabinets and other woodworking, has been preserved in close to original condition.

This early work by Gunnar Asplund already reflects his renowned sense of detail. Numerous interior details bear his personal mark. He designed a number of original items for the house, including tables, chairs, a sofa, a bookcase and a weather vane.

The district of Södermanland features a number of other works by Gunnar Asplund, including

- the Callin estate in Ålberga (1915),
- the State Granary in Eskilstuna (1917-1918),
- Oxelösund Cemetery (1924-1929),
- Oxelösund Chapel (1935-1937).

The Wichman family was soon to move to Stockholm, in 1915. Sturegarden House was then acquired by bank manager Lars Otto Hessner and wife Emy. Around 1950 the house was sold to bank manager Folke Rizell and family. Since 1968 it is owned by dentist Rune Åstrand (deceased) and wife Kristina and family.

The property has recently been put up for sale.

== Images ==
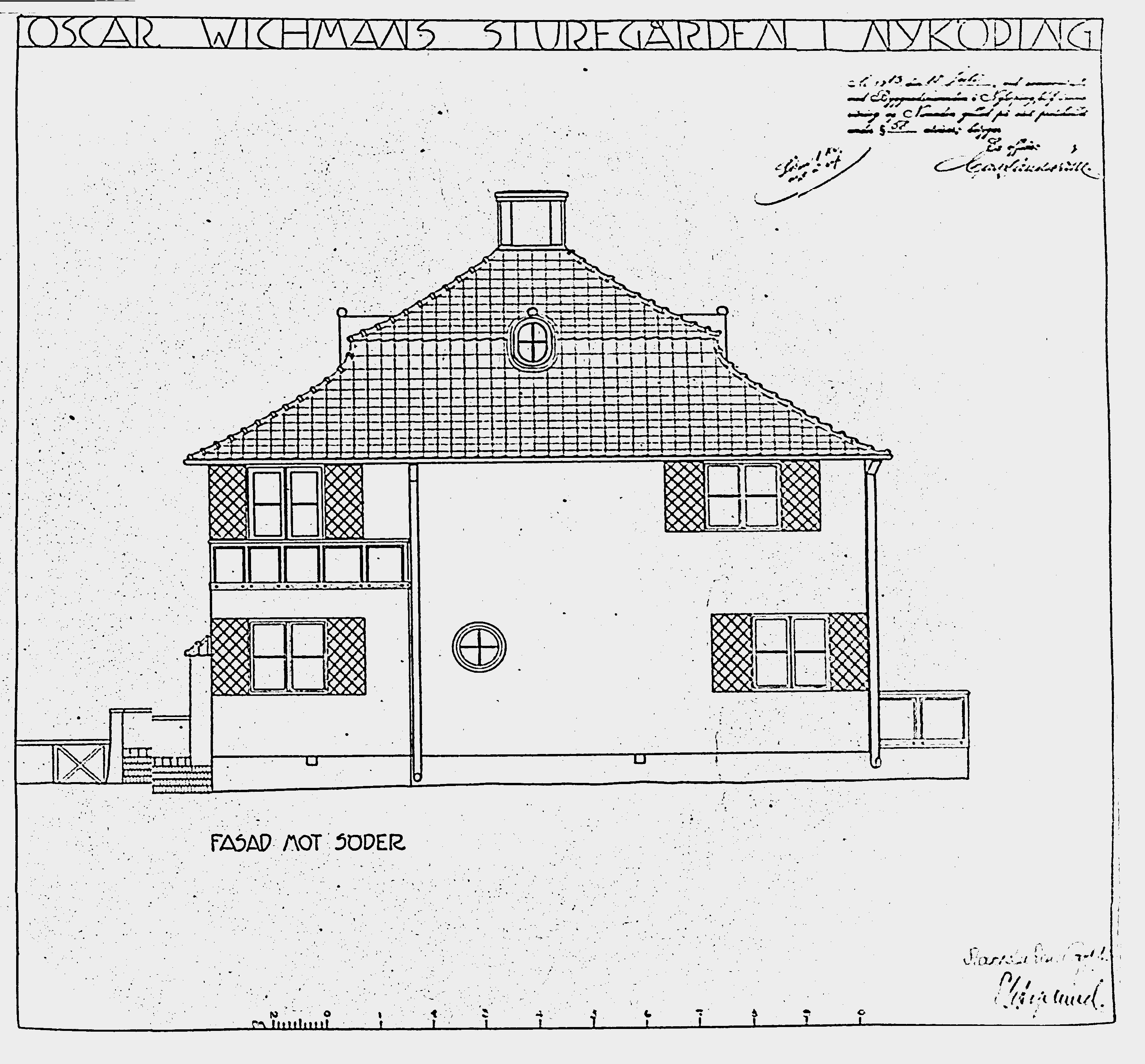
Sturegarden House, south facade, architect Gunnar Asplund 1913.

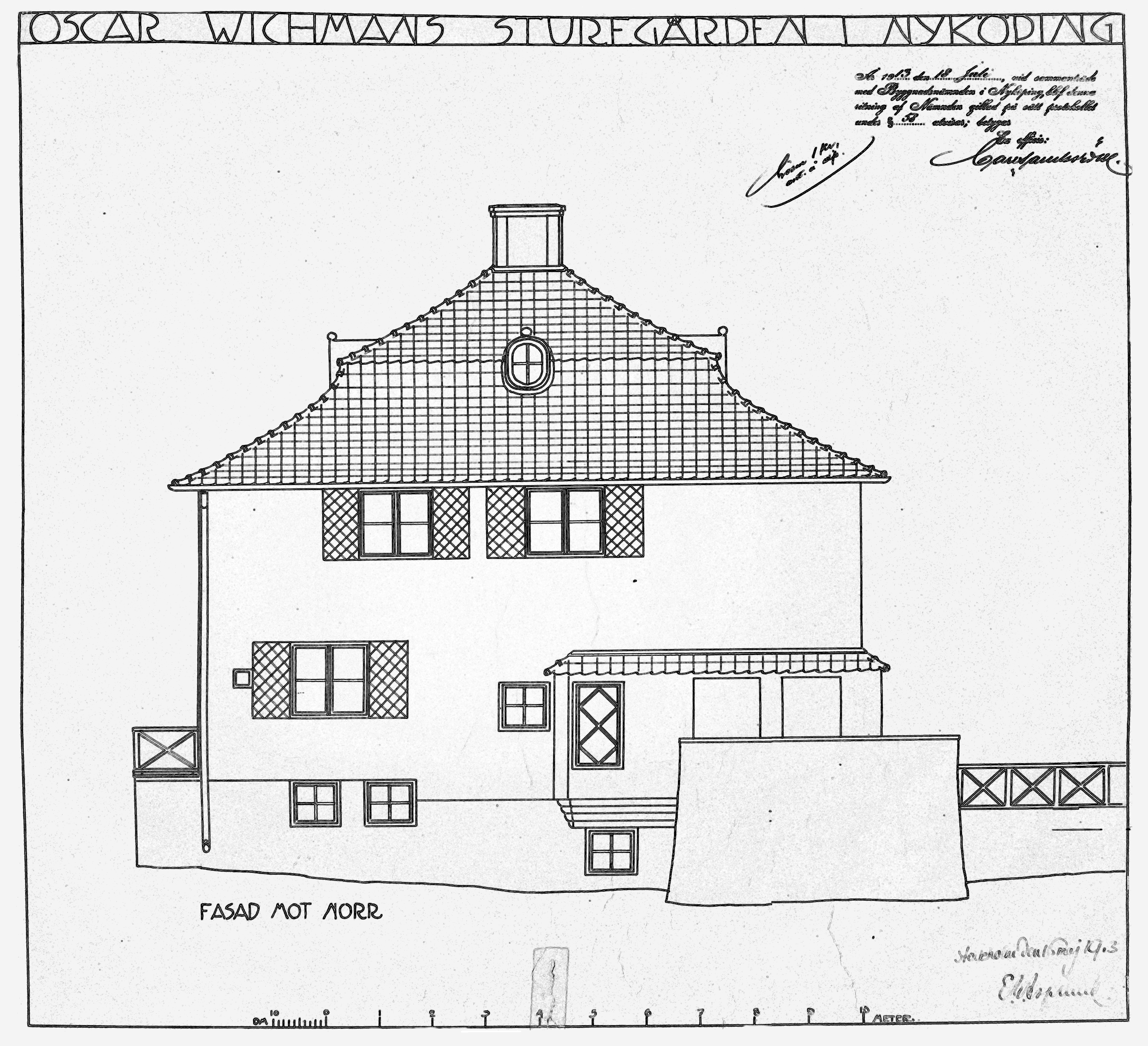
Sturegarden House, north facade, architect Gunnar Asplund 1913.

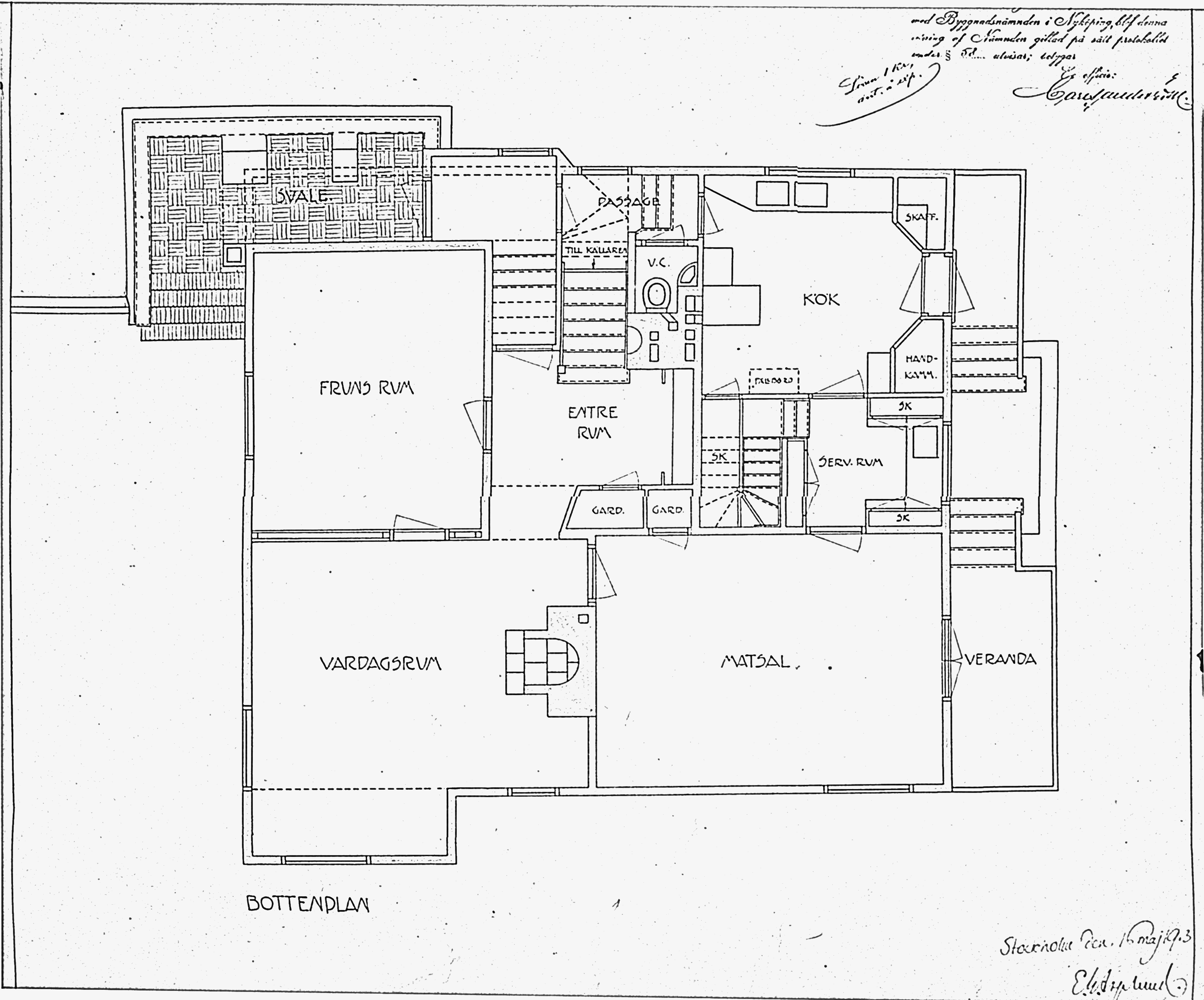
Sturegarden House, floor plan, ground floor, architect Gunnar Asplund 1913.

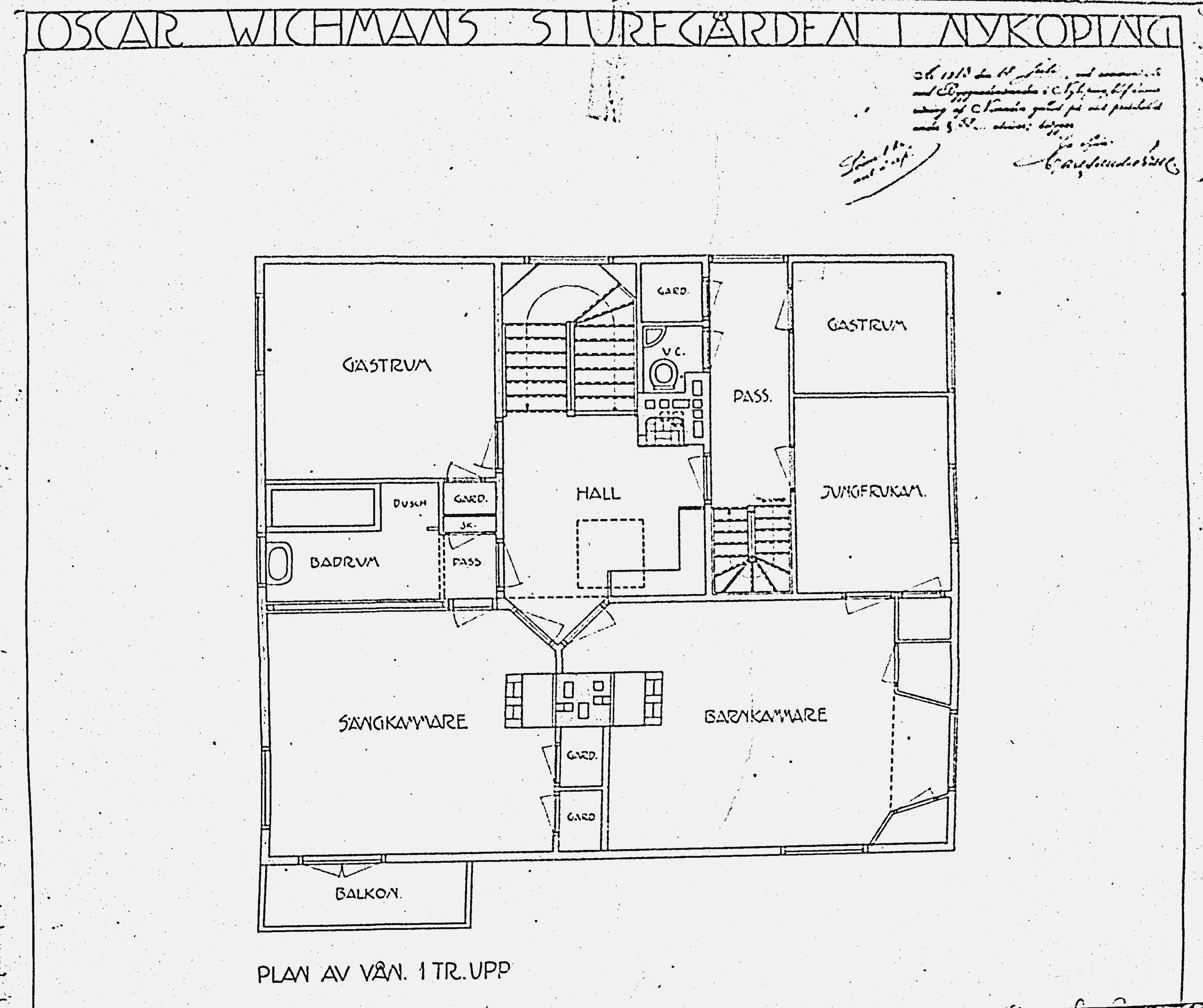
Sturegarden House, floor plan, first floor, architect Gunnar Asplund 1913.
