= Secco Sistemi =

Italian joint-stock company

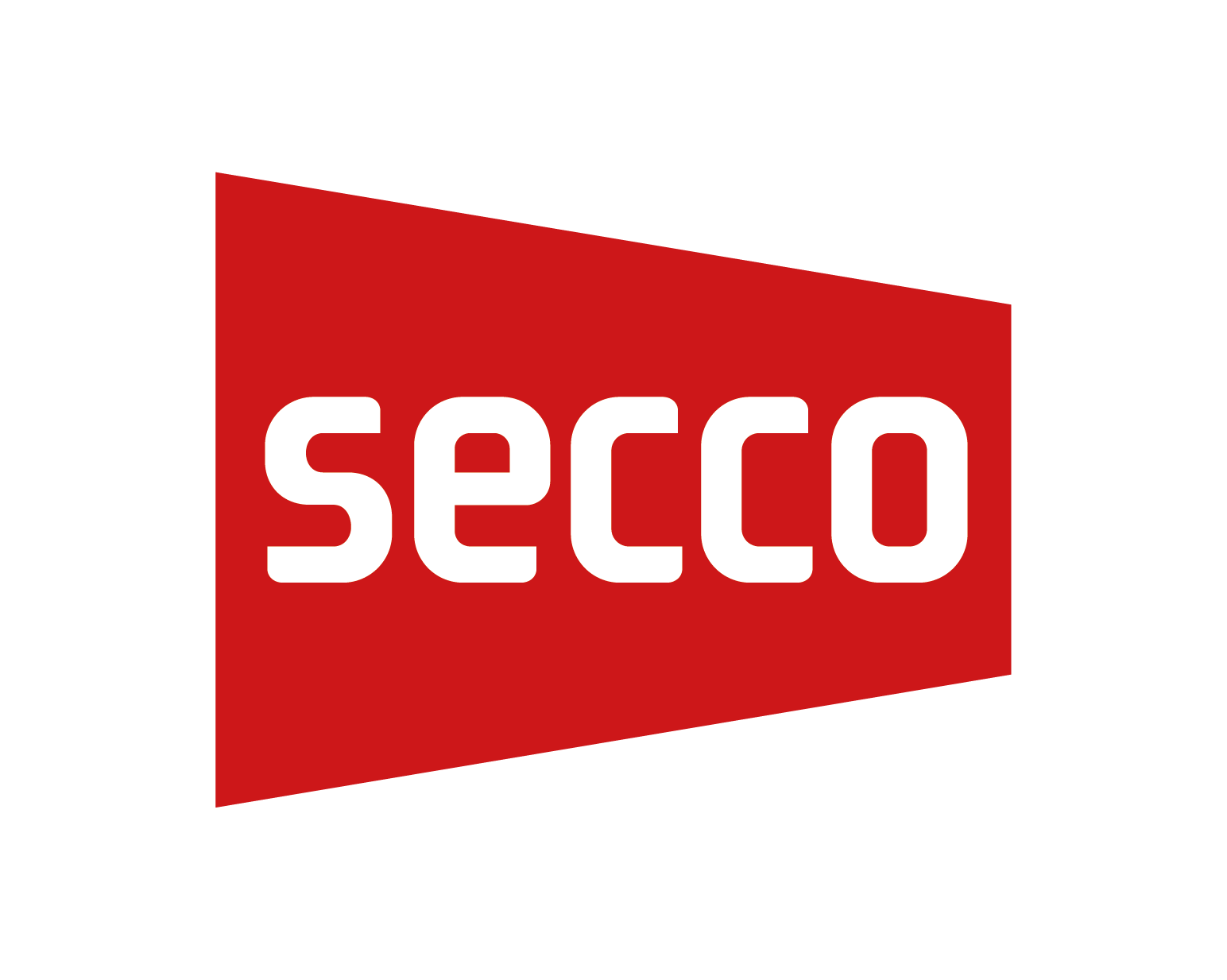
- Company type: Joint-stock company
- Industry: Engineering (Systems for windows, doors and façades)
- Founded: 1947
- Founder: Aldo Secco
- Headquarters: Preganziol, Treviso, Italy
- Key people: Luciano Gusmaroli (President); Alberto Agostini (CEO)
- Website: http://www.seccosistemi.com

Secco Sistemi is an Italian joint-stock company founded in 1947 in Treviso by Aldo Secco, in a building owned by his family. The company's brand name is derived from the founder's surname.

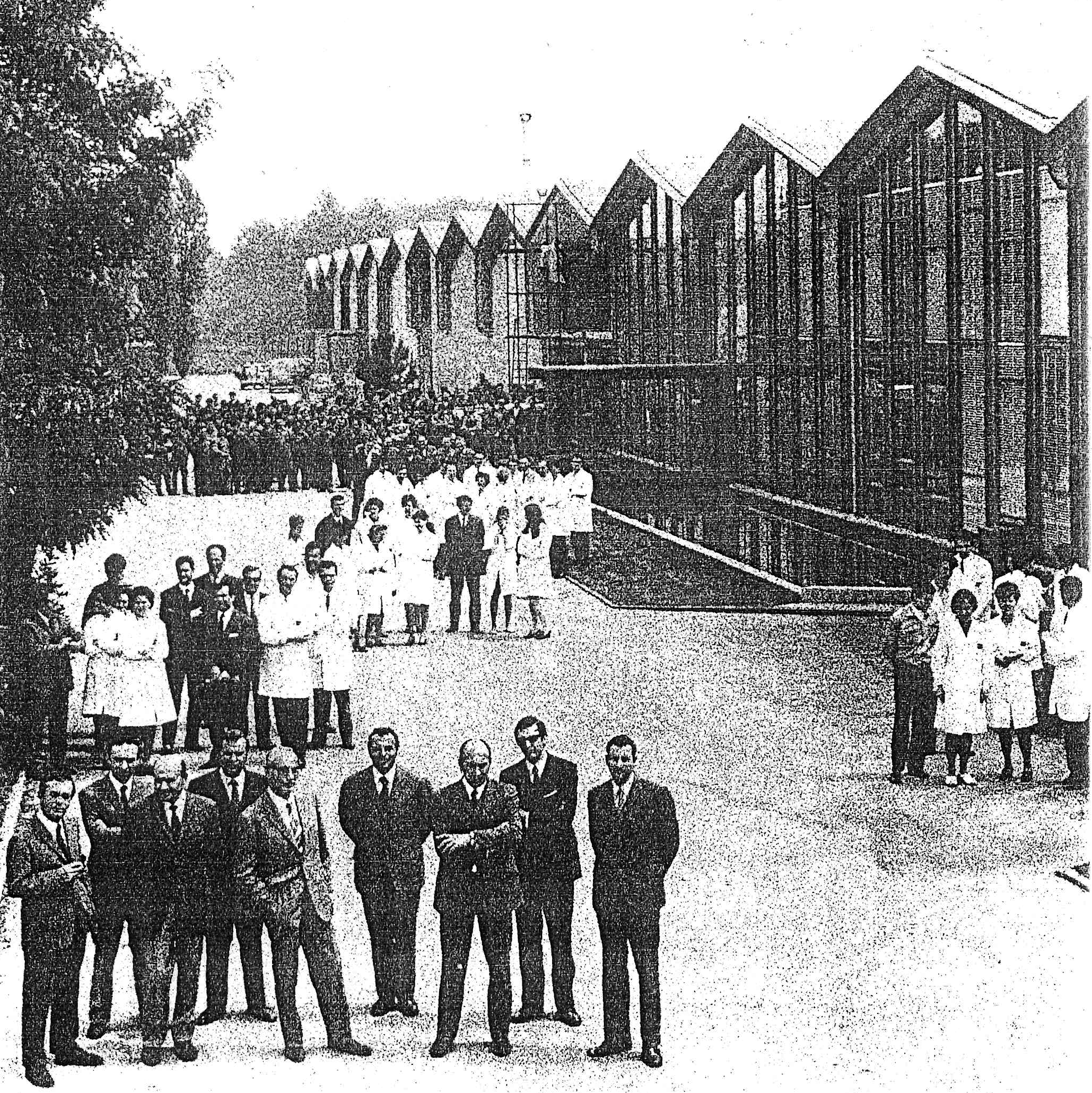
Aldo Secco with his employees in the first factory of Secco Sistemi in Preganziol (Treviso).

== History ==
Aldo Secco revolutionised the direction followed by his father in his old workshop, researching and experimenting with new technologies and machinery for the production of windows and doors in an industrial perspective. He designed a new machine for the production of profiles for windows and doors, called “Alda”, which had a profound effect on the company and the world of windows and doors.

The first successes were achieved with the product Seccolor, an innovative window and door frame offered in bright colours that, in 1981, won the Compasso d’Oro award, attracting orders from important clients all over the world, exporting not only the product, but also the technology required to produce it. The company had over 500 employees and in 1982 transformed from a simple company into a joint-stock company under the name “Industrie Secco S.p.A.”, and in 1986 it was listed on the stock exchange.

Later, however, a period of decline began, and in 1995 the company was forced to close. In the same year, however, entrepreneur Luciano Gusmeroli and engineer Alberto Agostini (former technical director ofIndustrie Secco) decided to recover what was left of the old company with the desire to restore it to its former glory as a leader in the window and door industry both in Italy and around the world, reorganising it and transforming the product intended for construction into a product dedicated to architecture, seeking out new and valuable materials for production and investing in product design.

Today, the company has about 80 employees, and its market is divided between 47% Italy and 53% abroad – the latter market is in continuous growth, given the great demand for luxury Italian products.

In 2018, with the new OS2 product dedicated to architecture and the world of restoration, it won the Compasso d'Oro.

Secco Sistemi now works with the big names in international architecture, promoting the culture of architecture and Made in Italy around the world through exhibitions and publications; Le Grandi Gallerie dell'Accademia – Electa, Adolf Loos – Galleria Marciana, Stanze – Triennale Milano, Vatican Chapels – Biennale di Architettura Venezia.

== Products ==
Below is a list of the main systems produced by the company:

XT – iron-type thermal break window frame - Architektur Bauwesen prize 2019

OS2 – minimal window frame - premio Compasso d’Oro 2018

EBE – traditional window frame made of precious metals – Architektur Bauwesen prize 2013 SA – tube-profiled window frames

4F – façade in precious metals

== Bibliography ==
1. XII edition Premio Compasso d’Oro, adi-design.org.

2. Industrie Secco 70% on sale for 50 billion, ricerca.repubblica.it, 23 December 1987.

3. Managers-entrepreneurs and research, ricerca.gelocal.it/tribunatreviso, 24 March 2005.

4. Secco, from Preganziol to the conquest of the United States, ricerca.gelocal.it/tribunatreviso, 3 October 2015.

5. Secco wins the Compasso d’Oro 2018, tribunatreviso.gelocal.it, 21 June 2018.

6. Venice: the great Academy, electa.it .

7. Adolf Loos, Our Contemporary, marciana.venezia.sbn.it .

8. Stanze. Other philosophies of living, artscore.it, 28 August 2016.

9. The pavilion of the Holy See debuts at the biennale architettura, elledecor.com, 1 June 2018.

10. The XT profiles by Secco awarded at BAU, arketipomagazine.it, 13 February 2019.

11. Secco receives the special Architektur und Bauwesen prize, serramentinews.it, 20 January 2013.
