= Gunnar Asplund =

Swedish architect (1885–1940)

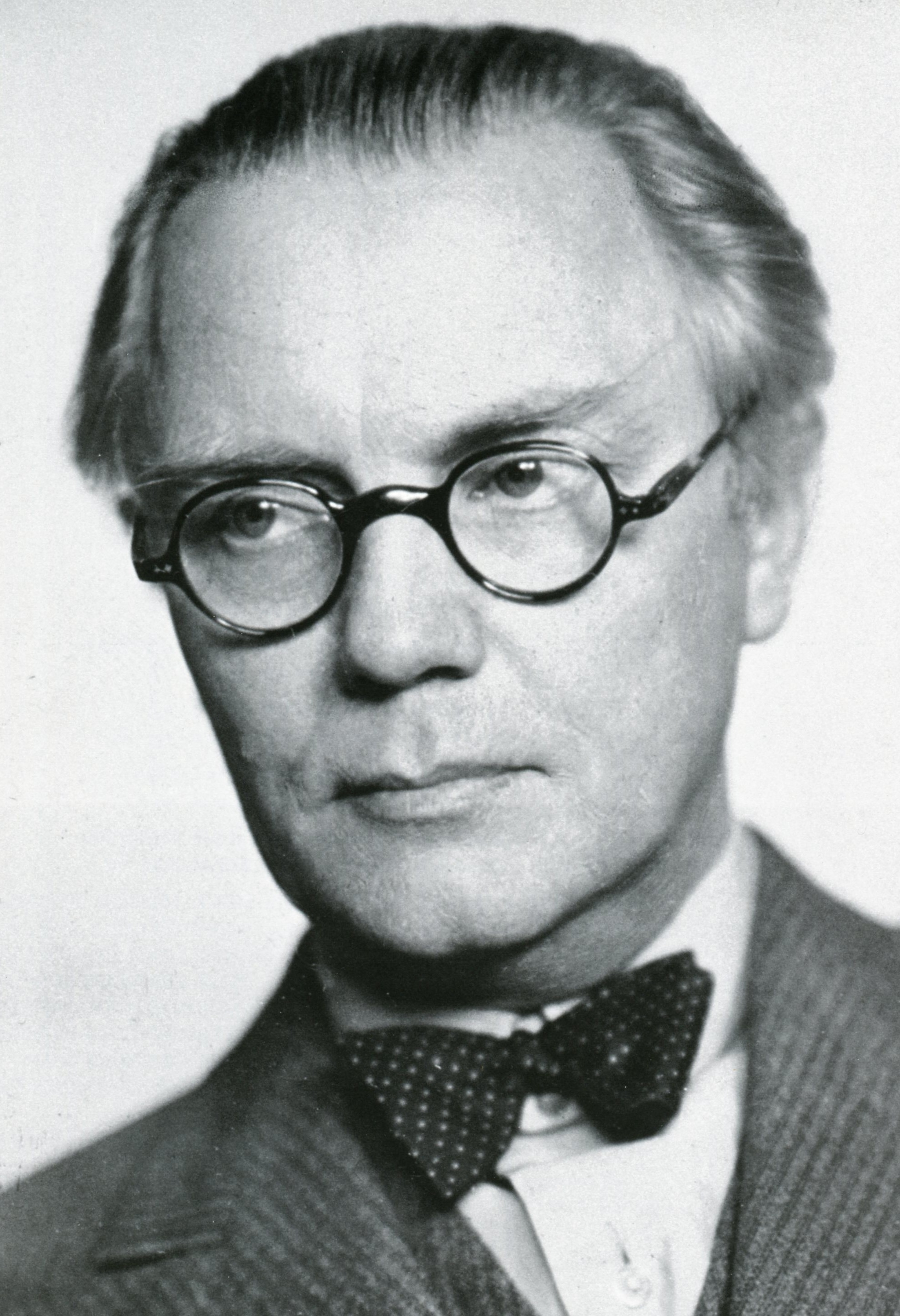
- Asplund in 1940
- Born: 22 September 1885; Stockholm, Sweden
- Died: 20 October 1940 (aged 55); Stockholm, Sweden
- Occupation: Architect
- Buildings: Villa Sturegården, Nyköping, (1913), The Snellman House, Djursholm, (1918), Stockholm (1920) The Listers County Court House, Sölvesborg, (1921), The Skandia Cinema, Stockholm (1923), Stockholm Public Library, (1928),
- Projects: Skogskyrkogården (1914–1940), Gothenburg Courthouse Extension (1913–1937)

Erik Gunnar Asplund (22 September 1885 – 20 October 1940) was a Swedish architect, mostly known as a key representative of Nordic Classicism of the 1920s during the last decade of his life. At this time, he was a major proponent of the modernist style which made its breakthrough in Sweden at the Stockholm International Exhibition (1930). Asplund was professor of architecture at the Royal Institute of Technology from 1931. His appointment was marked by a lecture, later published under the title "Our architectonic concept of space." The Woodland Crematorium at Stockholm South Cemetery (1935–1940) is considered his finest work and one of the masterpieces of modern architecture.

== Major works ==
Among Asplund's most important works is the Stockholm Public Library, constructed between 1924 and 1928, which stands as the prototypical example of the Nordic Classicism and so-called Swedish Grace movement. It was particularly influential on the proposal submitted for the competition for the design of the Viipuri Library in 1927 by Finnish architect Alvar Aalto, who regarded Asplund as his mentor.

Another important work is the extension of the Gothenburg City Hall Extension building which Asplund started on 1913 and finished 1937 – it shows his transformation from neo-classical to functionalist architect, a transformation in parallel with other European modernists like Erich Mendelsohn.

Asplund collaborated with architect Sigurd Lewerentz in the design of Skogskyrkogården, a cemetery which is a UNESCO world heritage site, created between 1914 and 1940. They were also the main architects for the temporary Stockholm International Exhibition (1930). Although temporary, the modernist, exposed-glass-and-steel-frame Entry Pavilion at the fair was internationally influential. In fact, it was influential already before its completion, having an influence on the much smaller Turku Fair in Finland, designed by Alvar Aalto and Erik Bryggman, who had travelled to Stockholm to see its construction.

Gunnar Asplund is considered perhaps the most important modernist Swedish architect and has had a major influence on later generations of Swedish and Nordic architects.

== Our architectonic concept of space ==
The lecture "Our architectonic concept of space" was delivered in 1931 on the occasion of Asplund being appointed professor of architecture at the Royal Institute of Technology in Stockholm. Asplund published few theoretical texts. The lecture was later regarded as an important contribution to the attitudes of Asplund, as well as others of his generation, towards the architectural problems of the time. The lecture has its background in the then well known 2-volume book by German philosopher Oswald Spengler "The decline of the West" (1918 and 1922).

== Bibliography ==
- López Peláez, José Manuel (2002). La arquitectura de Gunnar Asplund. Barcelona, Fundación Caja de Arquitectos. ISBN 9788493254223.
- Wrede, Stuart (1983). The Architecture of Erik Gunnar Asplund. Cambridge, Mass., MIT Press. ISBN 9780262730686

== Gallery ==
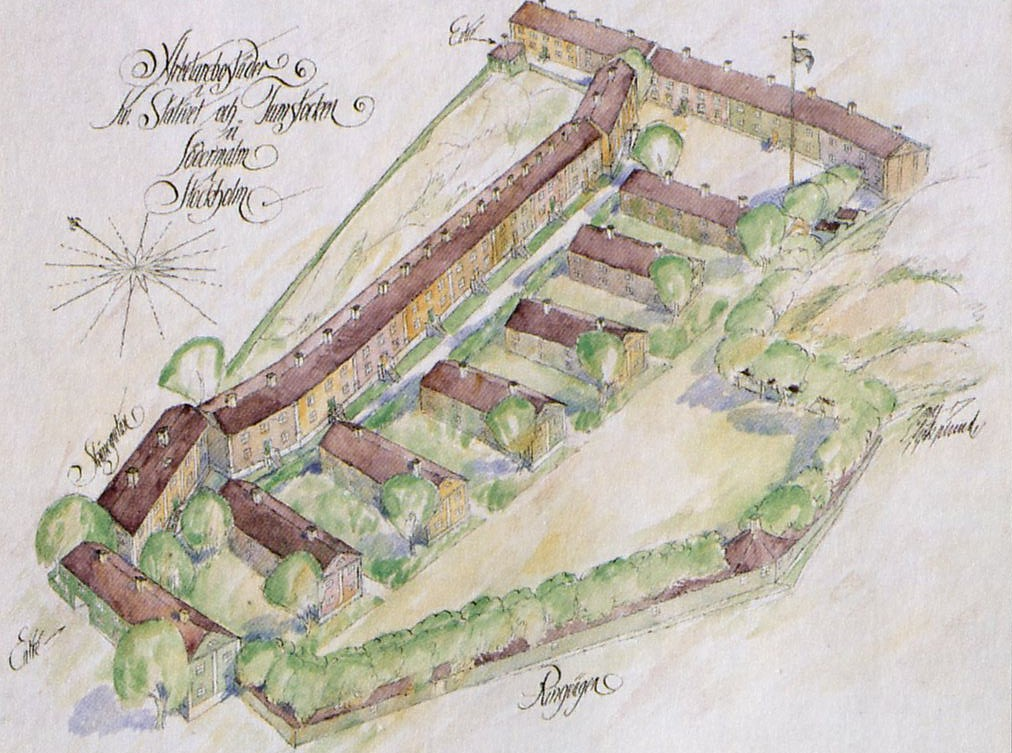
Proposal for emergency housing, Stativet and Tumstocken, Stockholm, 1917

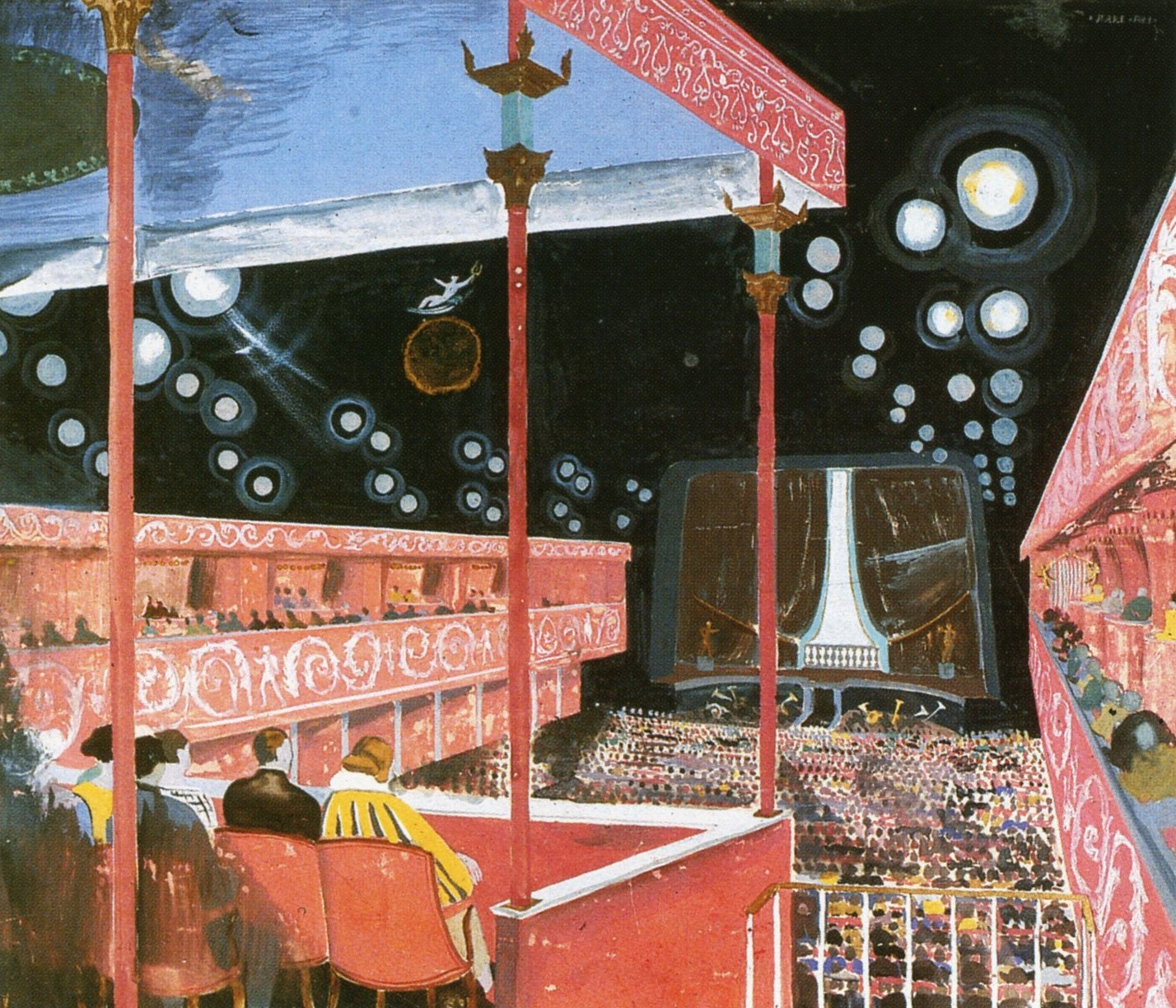
1922 sketch by Gunnar Asplund of the interior of the Skandia cinema, Stockholm

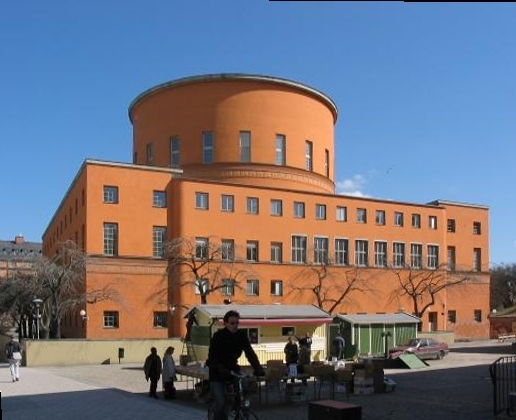
Stockholm Public Library

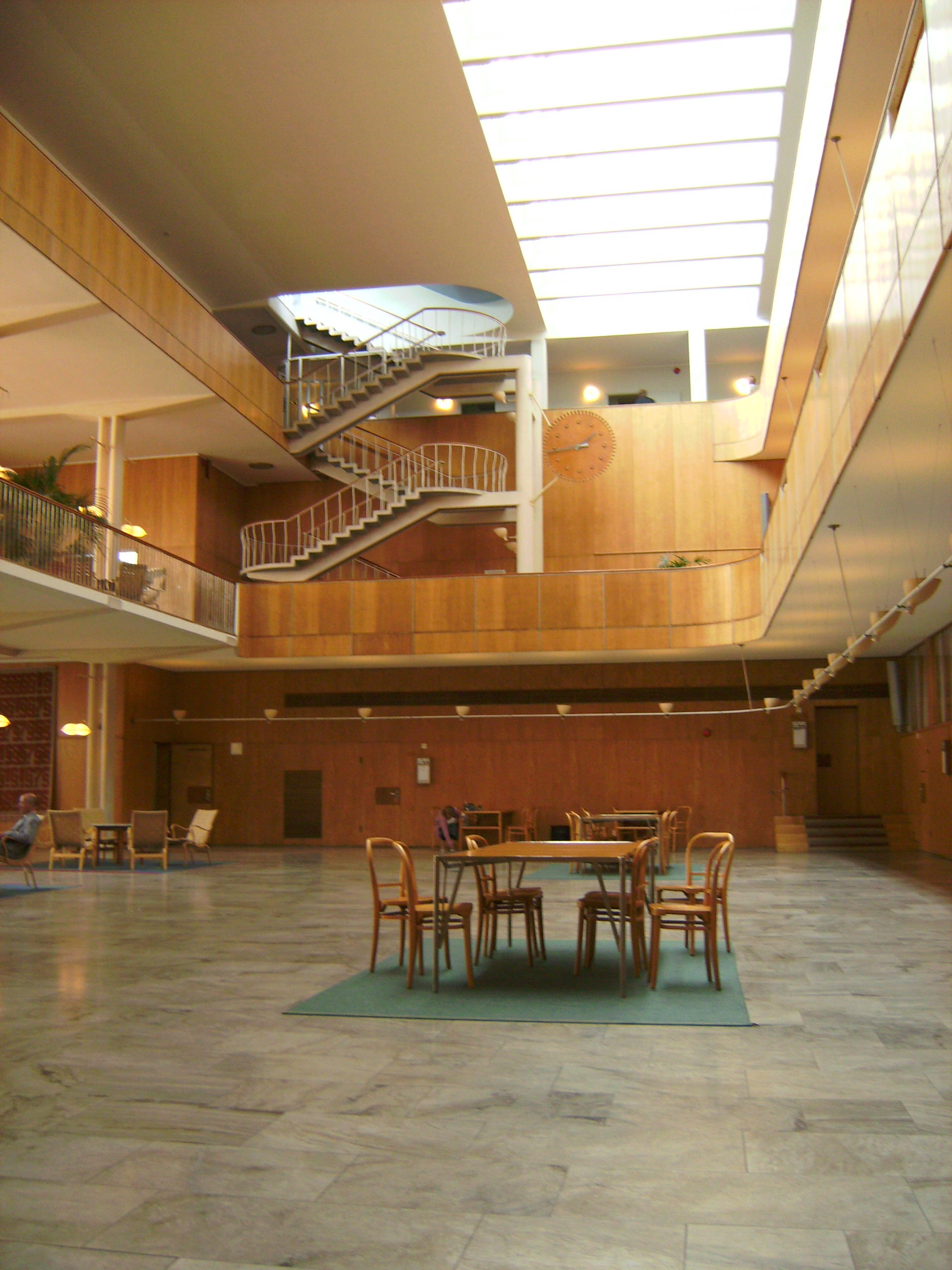
Gothenburg's City Hall Extension, interior

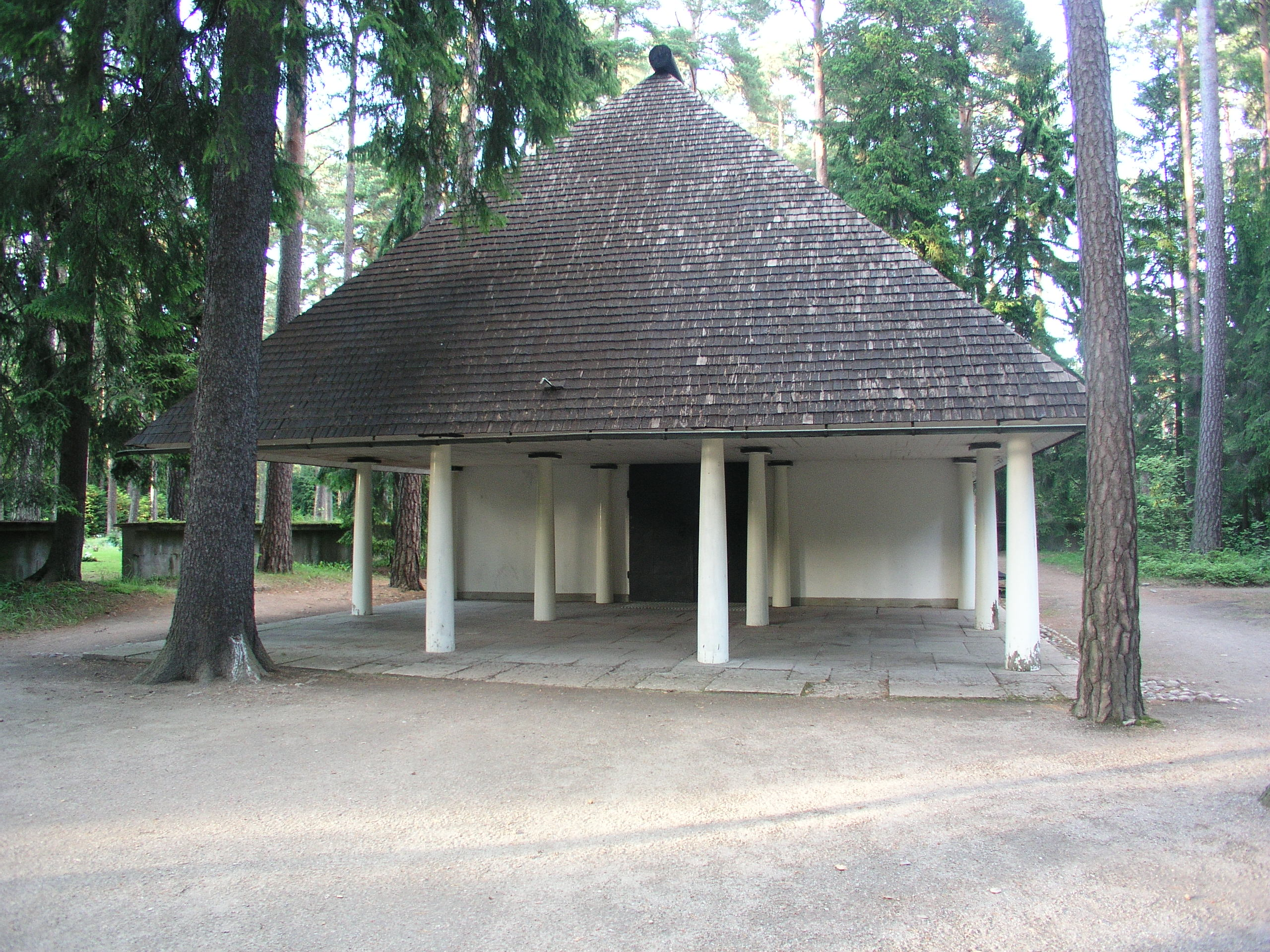
Skogskyrkogården cemetery

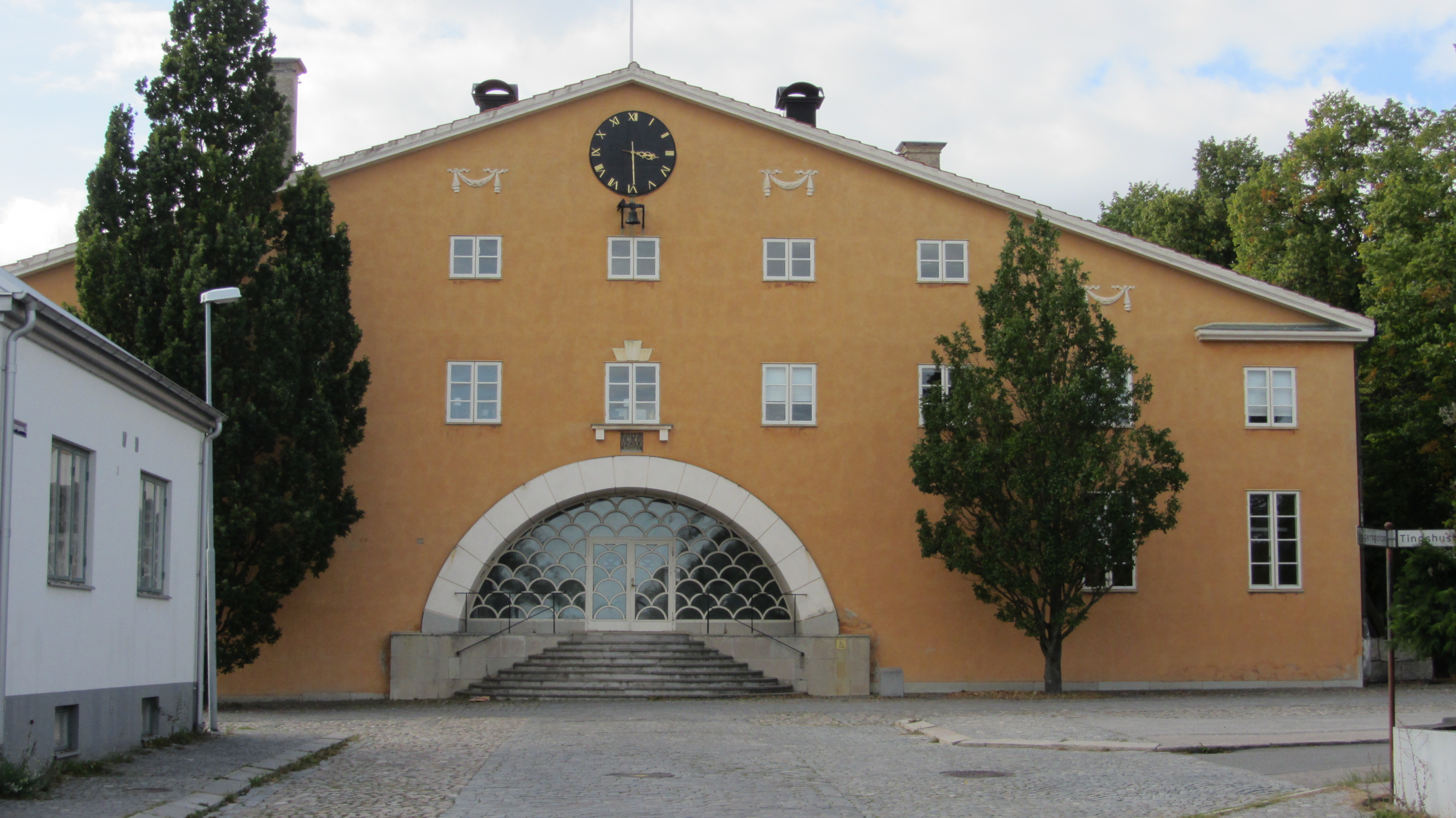
Listers County Court House, Sölvesborg

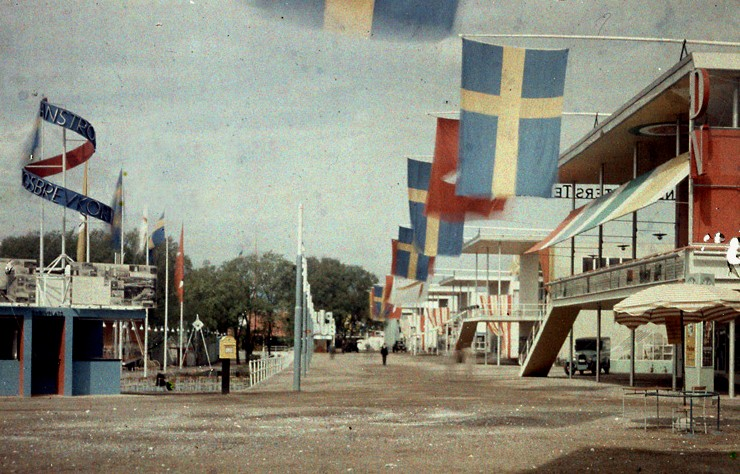
Stockholm Exhibition, 1930

== Exhibitions ==
- The Architecture of Gunnar Asplund, MoMA, New York (1978)
- En chantier: The Collections of the CCA, 1989–1999, Canadian Centre for Architecture, Montreal (1999–2000)
- Architecture and Design Drawings: Inaugural Installation, MoMA, New York (2004–2005)
- 75 Years of Architecture at MoMA, MoMA, New York (2007–2008)
- In Situ: Architecture and Landscape, MoMA, New York (2009–2010)
- Asplund Pavilion, Biennale of Architecture, Venice (2018–)
