= Chile Architecture Biennial =

Chilean architectural exhibition

Chile Architecture Biennial Bienal de Arquitectura y Urbanismo de Chile
- Status: Active
- Genre: Architecture exhibition
- Frequency: Biennially
- Location: Santiago
- Country: Chile
- Years active: 48–49
- Inaugurated: 1977
- Participants: National, international, invited architects
- Organiser: Colegio de Arquitectos de Chile

The Chilean Architecture and Urbanism Biennial (Spanish: Bienal de Arquitectura y Urbanismo de Chile) is a major event organized by the Chilean Association of Architects since 1977. It aims to foster dialogue, reflection, and the exchange of ideas about architectural practice, serving as a platform to showcase the best Chilean architectural and urban projects form the past two years.

== Expositions ==
Since its inaugural edition, the biennial has been held in various cultural spaces across Santiago. In 2015, the event took place in Valparaíso, marking the first edition held outside the Chilean capital.

Since that year, curators for the event have been selected through an open call organized by the Chilean Association of Architects. Seven years later, the Ministry of Cultures, Arts, and Heritage joined the process of selecting curators and pavilion proposals.

The 2022 edition, titled «Vulnerable Habitats» (Hábitats vulnerables), was postponed until January 2023. It featured several installations around La Moneda Palace in Santiago, including works by Smiljan Radić and Nicolás Schmidt, the reconstruction of a pavilion originally designed by Montserrat Palmer in 1972, and temporary structures designed by Jean Araya and Miguel Casassus, as well as Low Estudio.

== Editions ==
Year	Title	Original title	Curator(s)
1977	National Heritage	Patrimonio nacional	Cristián Fernández Cox
1979	Citymaking	Hacer ciudad	Eduardo Cuevas
1981	Housing	Vivienda	Marcelo Etcheverry
1983	Heritage and Present: The Critical Recovery of the Past	Patrimonio y Presente: La recuperación crítica del pasado	Pedro Murtinho
1985	Architecture and Quality of Life: Challenges of Social Housing	Arquitectura y calidad de vida: desafíos de la vivienda social	Ángel Hernández
1987	Architecture and the Future: Investigating the Future to Build the Present	Arquitectura y futuro: Indagar el futuro para construir el presente	Fernando Castillo Velasco
1989	Architecture and Criticism	Arquitectura y Crítica	Eduardo San Martín
1991	Latin American Architecture: A Unique Path	Arquitectura Latinoamericana: Un camino propio	Jorge Iglesis
1993	City and Environment, The Challenge	Ciudad y Medio Ambiente: El desafío	Juan Cárdenas
1995	Towards the Year 2000, What City Do We Want?	Hacia el año 2000, ¿Qué ciudad queremos?	Víctor Gubbins
1997	Public Space: Relevance and Destiny	El Espacio Público: Vigencia y destino	Pilar Urrejola
2000	Public Architecture: Reinventing the Future	Arquitectura de uso público: Re-inventar el futuro	Humberto Eliash
2002	Globalization, Communication, and Architecture	Globalización, Comunicación y Arquitectura	Alberto Sartori
2004	Urban Reform: Let's Make It Happen	Reforma Urbana: Hagámosla realidad	Patricio Schmidt
2006	Humanity, Quality, and Integration	Humanidad Calidad e Integración	Cristián Undurraga
2008	Towards an Architecture that Cares for Our Earth	Hacia una Arquitectura que cuide nuestra Tierra	Juan Ignacio Baixas
2010	8.8 Reconstruction	8.8 Re-construcción	Guillermo Hevia
2012	Cities for Citizens	Ciudades para ciudadanos	Sebastián Gray
2015	Architecture and Education: The Country We Want	Arquitectura y Educación: El país que queremos	Fernando Marín
2017	Urgent Dialogues	Diálogos Impostergables	Felipe Vera
2019	Open Architecture Fair: The Common and the Ordinary	Feria Libre de Arquitectura. Lo común y lo corriente	Beatriz Coeffé, Joaquín González, Vesna Obilinovic, Juan Pablo Urrutia, Tomás Villalón
2022	Vulnerable Habitats	Hábitats vulnerables	Loreto Lyon, Cristóbal Molina
2025	Double Exposure: Reprogram, Revitalize, Rebuild	Doble exposición: reprogramar, revitalizar, reconstruir	Ángela Carvajal, Sebastián López, Óscar Aceves

== See also ==
- Architecture of Chile
- Chicago Architecture Biennial
- Venice Biennale of Architecture
- International Architecture Biennale of São Paulo
