= Montserrat Palmer =

Chilean architect (born 1933)

- Born: September 13, 1933
- Education: University of Chile
- Occupation: Architect
- Notable work: Estación Mapocho

Montserrat Palmer (Santiago, Chile, September 13, 1933) is a Chilean architect, designer, academic, researcher, and editor.

She was the first female Dean of the Faculty of Architecture, Design, and Urban Studies at the Pontifical Catholic University of Chile.

== Education and career ==
Born to Catalan parents, Palmer was born in Santiago, Chile, and enrolled at the Pontifical Catholic University of Chile in 1952. However, she eventually graduated from the University of Chile in 1961.

Two years later, she was hired as a professor at the Faculty of Architecture and Urbanism of the University of Chile. In 1974, she had to resign from her position due to the interventions of Augusto Pinochet's military dictatorship. The following year, she was hired as a professor at the Pontifical Catholic University of Chile, where she eventually became the first female Dean of the Faculty of Architecture, Design, and Urban Studies, leading the institution from 2000 to 2004.

As a researcher, her first publication was entitled 50 años de arquitectura metálica en Chile ("50 Years of Metallic Architecture in Chile"), composed of two volumes. In 1984, she published La comuna de Providencia y la ciudad jardín ("The Providencia District and the Garden City"), a study where she deployed an analysis strategy that mixed morphology and history to examine the Providencia commune in Santiago, Chile.

In 1993, she published La arquitectura contemporánea de la madera en Chile ("Contemporary Wood Architecture in Chile"), a development study covering a period from 1969 until 1990, which included works that became emblems of post-dictatorship architecture in Chile, such as the Klotz House (1990) by Mathias Klotz and the Chile Pavilion for the Seville Expo '92 by Germán del Sol and José Cruz Ovalle.

== Legacy ==
Due to her research on the history of architecture in Chile, she has been considered "the voice of authority in the architectural culture of Chile between the end of the 20th century and the beginning of the 21st century."

Between 1980 and 2010, she was the Editor-in-chief of Ediciones ARQ, advocating for the technical dimension of architecture and for finding an aesthetic that arises precisely from architects' commitment to building materials. In 2010, when Montserrat stepped down as director, the publisher released a monograph on her works.

José Rosas, former dean of the Faculty of Architecture, Design, and Urban Studies, stated in 2018:

"Montserrat Palmer has positioned Chilean and Latin American architecture, as well as the theoretical reflection of different architecture and urbanism researchers, in a place of undeniable prestige and recognition among their peers."

In 2023, as part of the Chile Architecture Biennial, architects Loreto Lyon and Cristobal Molina reinterpreted the Plaza de la Constitución pavilion, which references an intervention created by Montserrat Palmer for the 1972 United Nations Conference on Trade and Development (UNCTAD III) in Santiago.

== Notable works ==
- Hostería La Pirámide (1963), alongside Carlos Martner
- Plaza de la Constitución Pavilion (1972)
- Estación Mapocho Cultural Center (1994), designed alongside Teodoro Fernández, Rodrigo Pérez de Arce and Ramón López.
