= National Architecture Award of Chile =

Architecture prize

- Awarded for: Architect's body of work
- Sponsored by: Colegio de Arquitectos de Chile
- Country: Chile
- First award: 1969

The National Architecture Award of Chile (Spanish: Premio Nacional de Arquitectura de Chile) is the highest distinction that an architect can receive in Chile, granted annually by the Colegio de Arquitectos de Chile.

It was first given in 1969 on a yearly basis until 1977. Since then, the award is granted every other year. The award acknowledges architects "whose career and ethical and professional performance have set an example for all architects."

== Winners ==
Year	Architect	Significant building(s)
1969	Juan Martínez Gutiérrez	Facultad de Derecho de la Universidad de Chile; Escuela Militar; Votive Temple of Maipú
1970	Carlos Bresciani Bagattini	Unidad Vecinal Portales (1966); Torres de Tajamar
1971	Roberto Dávila Carson	Cap Ducal
1972	Sergio Larraín García-Moreno	Oberpaur
1973	Héctor Mardones	Banco del Estado de Chile
1974	Rodulfo Oyarzún Philippi	Santiago Stock Exchange
1975	Alberto Cruz Covarrubias	Escuela de Valparaíso, Grupo Ciudad Abierta
1976	Héctor Valdés	Unidad Vecinal Portales; Torres de Tajamar
1977	Emilio Duhart	CEPAL Headquarters
1979	Carlos Buschmann Zwansger	Intendencia de Osorno
1981	Edwin Weil Wohlke	Instituto Alemán de Frutillar
1983	Fernando Castillo Velasco	Unidad Vecinal Portales; Torres de Tajamar
1985	Jorge Aguirre Silva	Caja de Crédito Popular
1987	Mario Recordón Burnier	Estadio Monumental David Arellano
1989	Mario Pérez de Arce Lavín	Iglesia del Colegio Verbo Divino; Edificio la Merced
1991	Francisco de Borja García-Huidobro	Ministry of Economics and Finance in Paris
1993	Christian de Groote	El Mercurio Headquarters
1995	Roberto Goycoolea	Biblioteca de la Universidad de Concepción
1997	Cristián Fernández Cox	Seminario Pontificio de Santiago
2000	Victor Gubbins	Centro Cultural Chimkowe
2002	Juan Sabbagh	Chilean pavilion at the Expo 2010
2004	Luis Izquierdo and Antonia Lehmann	Edificio Manantiales
2006	Germán del Sol	Chilean pavilion at the Seville Expo '92; Termas Geométricas
2008	Cristián Valdés	Valdés Chair
2010	Enrique Browne	Consorcio headquarters
2012	José Cruz Ovalle	Chilean pavilion at the Seville Expo '92; Adolfo Ibáñez University Campus
2014	Teodoro Fernández Larrañaga	Bicentennial Park (Vitacura)
2016	Edward Rojas	Museo de Arte Moderno Chiloé
2019	Miguel Lawner	Remodelación San Luis
2022	Fernando Pérez Oyarzún	History of Chilean Architecture
2024	Cristián Castillo Echeverría	
2026	Alejandro Aravena and Smiljan Radic	
