= Parque de los Reyes =

Park in Santiago, Chile

Parque de Los Reyes
- Interactive map of Parque de Los Reyes
- Type: Urban Park
- Location: Santiago, Quinta NormalChile
- Coordinates: 33°25′42″N 70°40′11″W
- Area: 31 hectares (77 acres)
- Created: 1992
- Operator: Santiago
- Status: Open

Parque de Los Reyes (“Kings' Park”) is part of the "Santiago integrated park system" that also included Parque Forestal and Parque Fluvial Padre Renato Poblete.

The park lies on the south bank of the Mapocho River and extends to Balmaceda Avenue in the south, Estación Mapocho Cultural Centre in the east and Quinta Normal in the west.

The park lies across two of the communes of Chile's capital city, (Santiago (in its central and eastern parts) and Quinta Normal (in its western part). The name of the park commemorates the 500th anniversary of the discovery and colonization of the Americas, and honours the Spanish royal family. It opened in 1992 in a ceremony hosted by King King Juan Carlos and Queen Sofía of Spain. The park is bordered to the east by Parque Forestal and to the west by Parque Fluvial Padre Renato Poblete and is administered by the Municipality of Santiago.

== The park ==
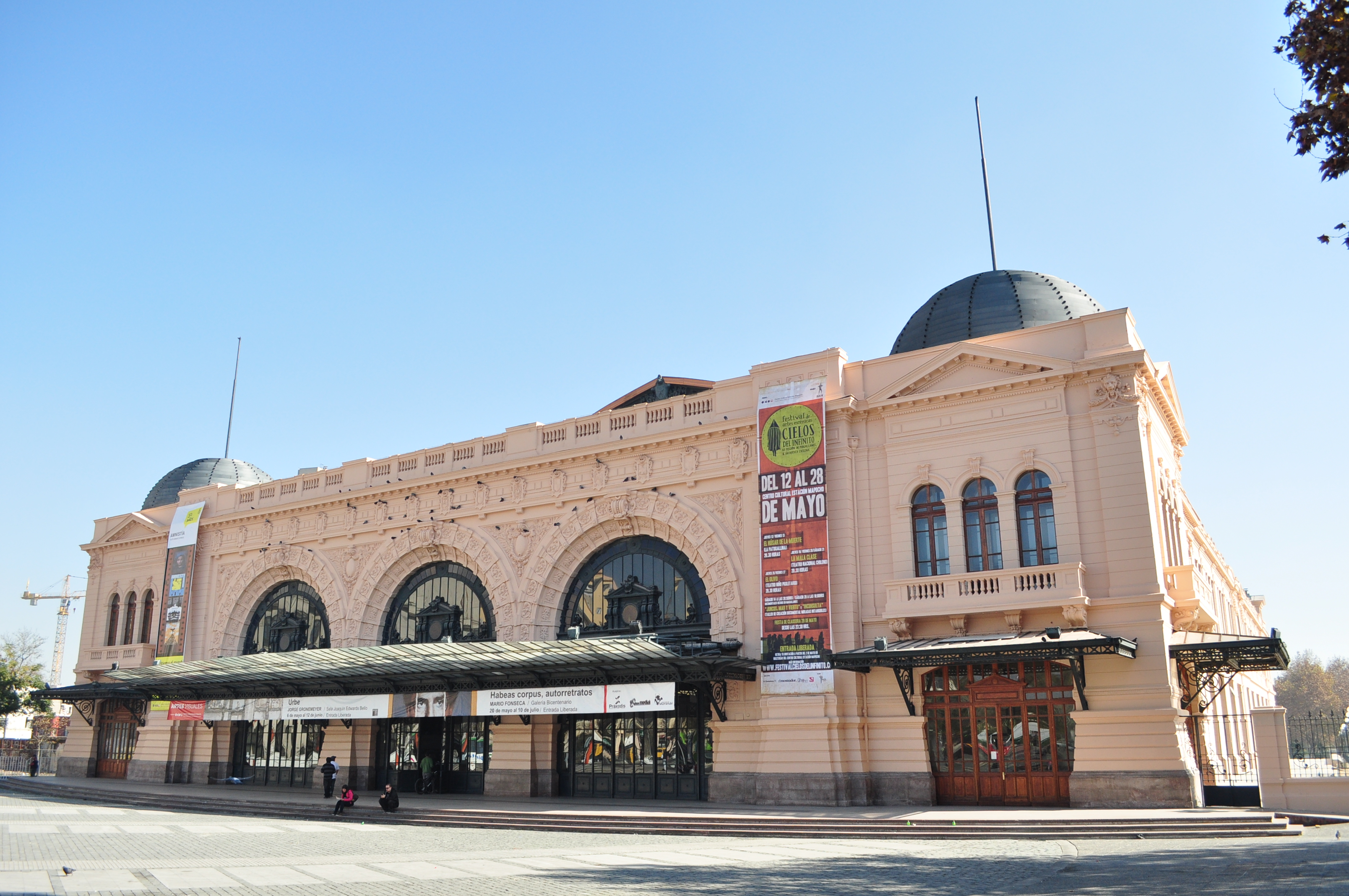
Centro Cultural Estación Mapocho located between Parque Forestal and Los Reyes

Estación Mapocho Cultural Centre is located on the eastern edge of the park and Balmaceda 1215 cultural centre, home to the Youth and Children's Orchestras Foundation of Chile, and the metro station Puente Cal y Canto.

In the central zone of the park lies a sports centre that offers free aerobics, aerobox, football and other sport classes every Saturday morning, as well as a 2000 square metre skatepark, considered one of the best in the city. Between the skate park and Estacion Mapocho lies a 4000 square metre pool and a flea market, known in Chile as a "persa".

The western part of the park includes the "Perrera Arte (“kennel art”) Experimental Art Centre", which, as its name suggests, is located in the premises of a former kennels. Here can also be found the "Memorial Puente Bulnes" (Bulnes Bridge Memorial), the "Muro de la Memoria" (Memory Wall) and the "Plaza Joan Alsina" (Juan Alsina Square), all of which commemorate the victims of the Chilean military regime.
