= Bicentennial Park (Vitacura) =

Urban park in Santiago, Chile

- Parque Bicentenario
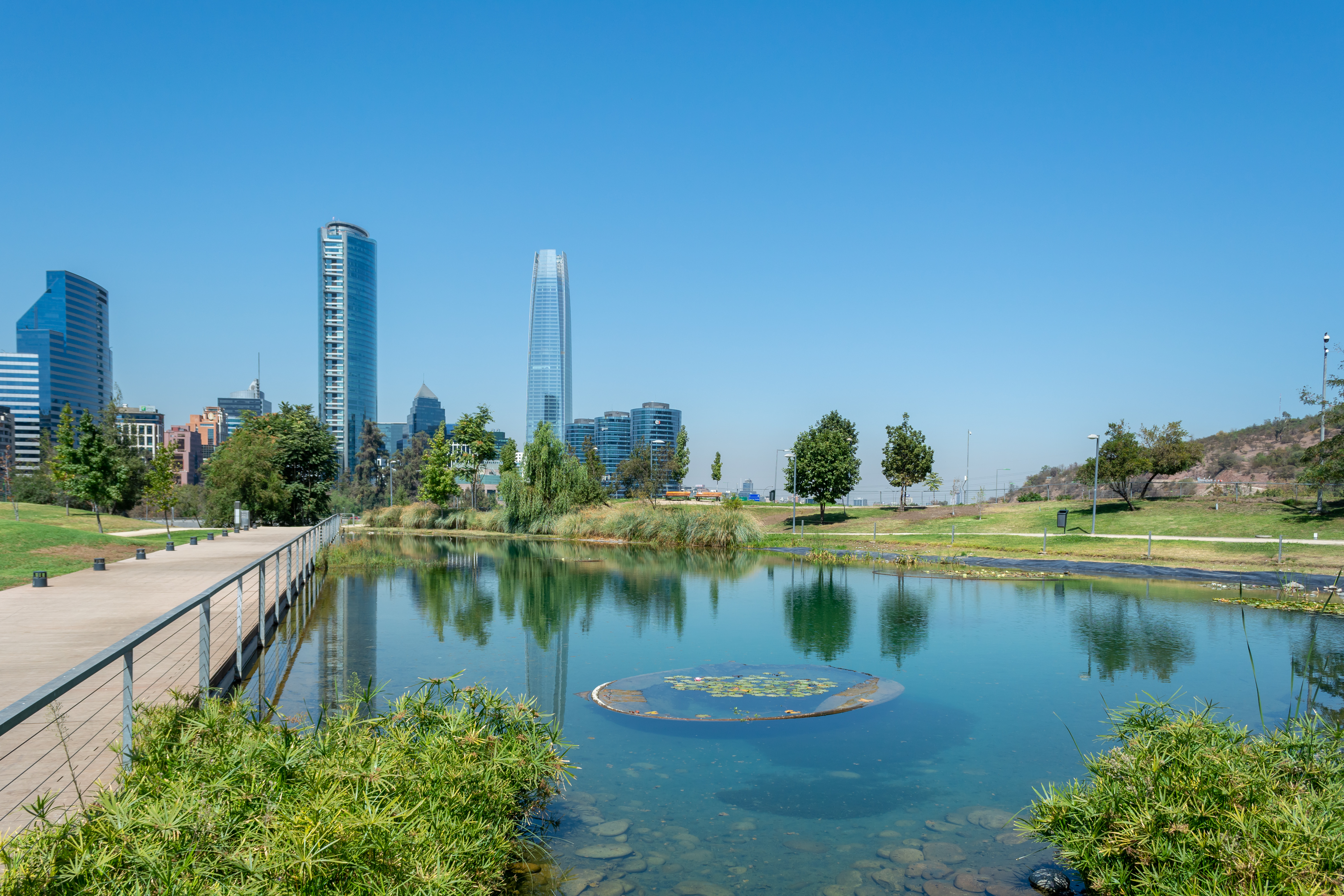
- Interactive map of Bicentennial Park
- Location: Vitacura, Santiago, Chile
- Coordinates: 33°24′02″S 70°36′08″W
- Area: 30 hectares (74 acres)
- Created: 2006
- Operator: Municipality of Vitacura
- Status: Public park

The Bicentennial Park (Spanish: Parque Bicentenario), is an urban park in the commune of Vitacura, one of the largest parks of the city of Santiago, Chile. The park was designed by the Chilean architect Teodoro Fernández after winning the official design competition in 1998, and the first phase opened its doors in 2007.

== History ==
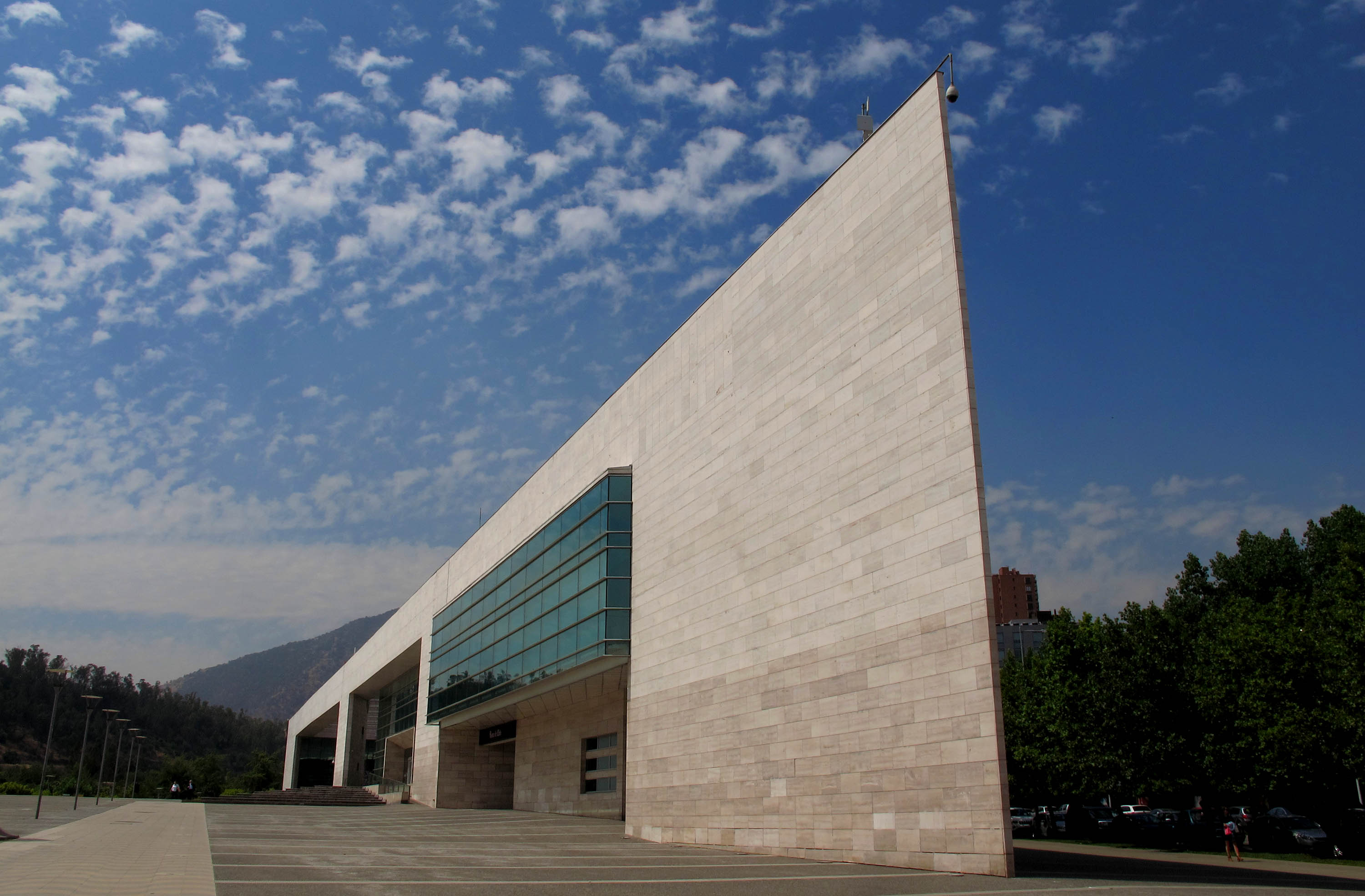
Vitacura city hall in Bicentennial Park

The Bicentennial Park is the result of the public competition called in 1998 by the City Council of Vitacura to establish a strategic plan that would organize the landscape and urban development of what was then known as the Parque de Las Américas ("Park of the Americas"), located on the banks of the Mapocho River.

The winning proposal was led by Chilean architect Teodoro Fernández. Construction began in 2006, and it was inaugurated in two stages: the first, covering 18 hectares, was opened to the public in 2007. Then, in November 2011, the second and final phase was inaugurated, whose design was also led by the same architecture and landscaping team.

After its inauguration, the park became part of the network of public parks that extends continuously along the south bank of the Mapocho River, connecting the Parque de la Familia, Parque de Los Reyes, Parque Forestal, Parque Providencia, Parque Titanium and the Parque Monseñor Escrivá de Balaguer.

== Features ==
The park has at its central core the city hall of Vitacura, a complex that concentrates the public services of the namesake commune. Moreover, a restaurant designed by Smiljan Radić Clarke marks its eastern entrance, along two artificial lakes, expansive grassy areas, a variety of local trees, and programmed spaces for leisure activities, rest, and family walks.
