= Marisfrolg Pavilion =

Building in Shenzhen, China

Marisfrolg Pavilion 玛丝菲尔大厦
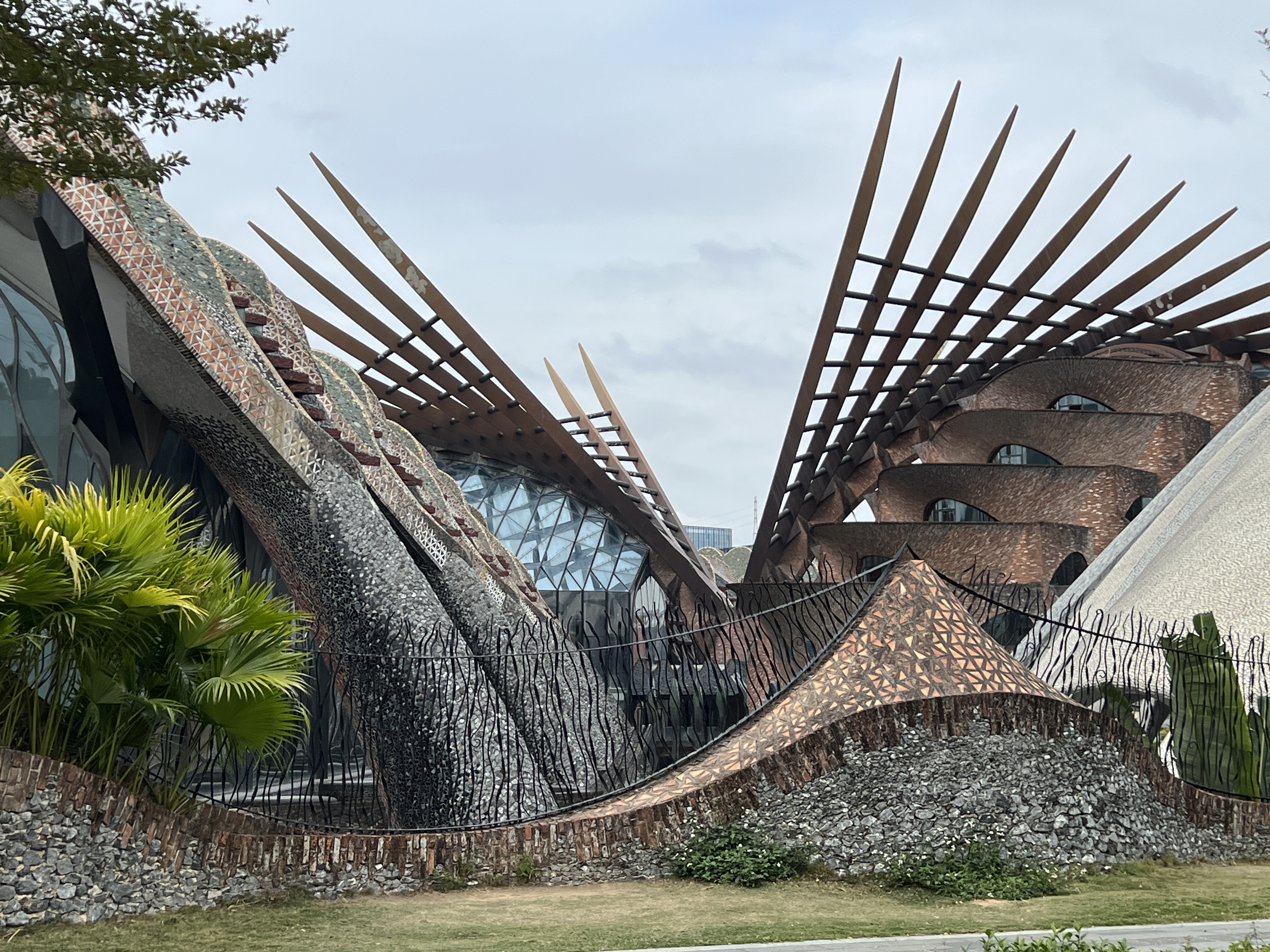
- Architectural Exterior
- Interactive map of the Marisfrolg Pavilion 玛丝菲尔大厦 area

General information
- Location: Longhua, Shenzhen, Guangdong, China
- Coordinates: 22.7034°N 113.9786°E
- Construction started: 2008
- Completed: 2023
- Owner: Marisfrolg

Technical details
- Material: Glass, metal, concrete

Design and construction
- Architecture firm: Architecture Van Brandenburg

Website
- www.marisfrolg.com

Marisfrolg Pavilion (simplified Chinese: 玛丝菲尔大厦; traditional Chinese: 瑪絲菲爾大廈), located in Longhua District, Shenzhen, Guangdong Province, China, is the headquarters of the Shenzhen fashion brand Marisfrolg. Designed by New Zealand Studio Architecture Van Brandenburg (AVB), the building features biomimetic designs inspired by tropical plants and the spiky exoskeletons of insects. The main structure is a combination of steel and reinforced concrete, with the exterior decorated using a mosaic of tiles, brick fragments, and stones. The building is on an island site of 5.5 hectares with a 120,000-square-metre. Construction began in 2008 and took 15 years to complete. The architecture seems to have been influenced by the early style of Antoni Gaudí and Santiago Calatrava. It had received attention at the 14th Venice Biennale of Architecture.

== Gallery ==
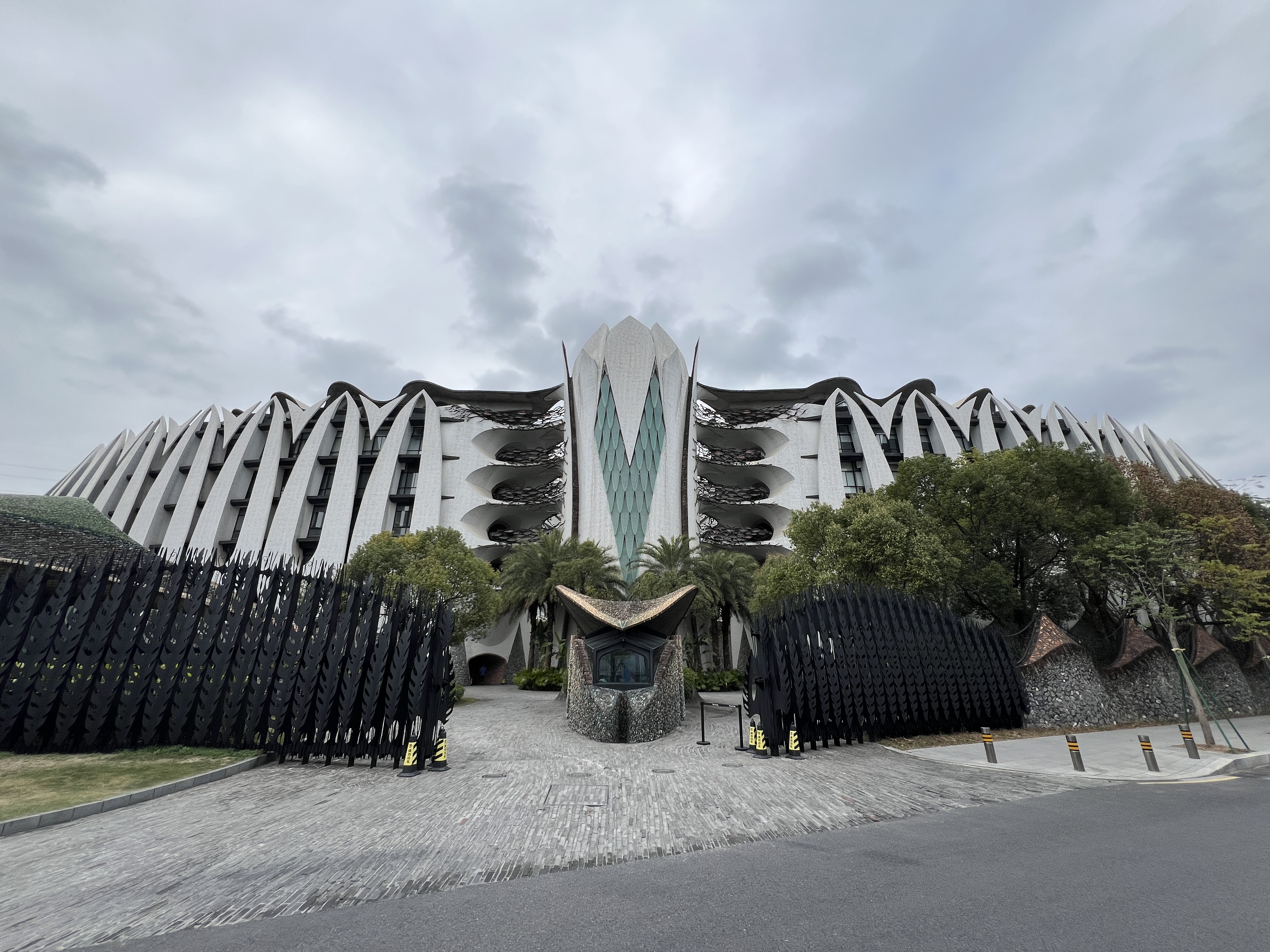

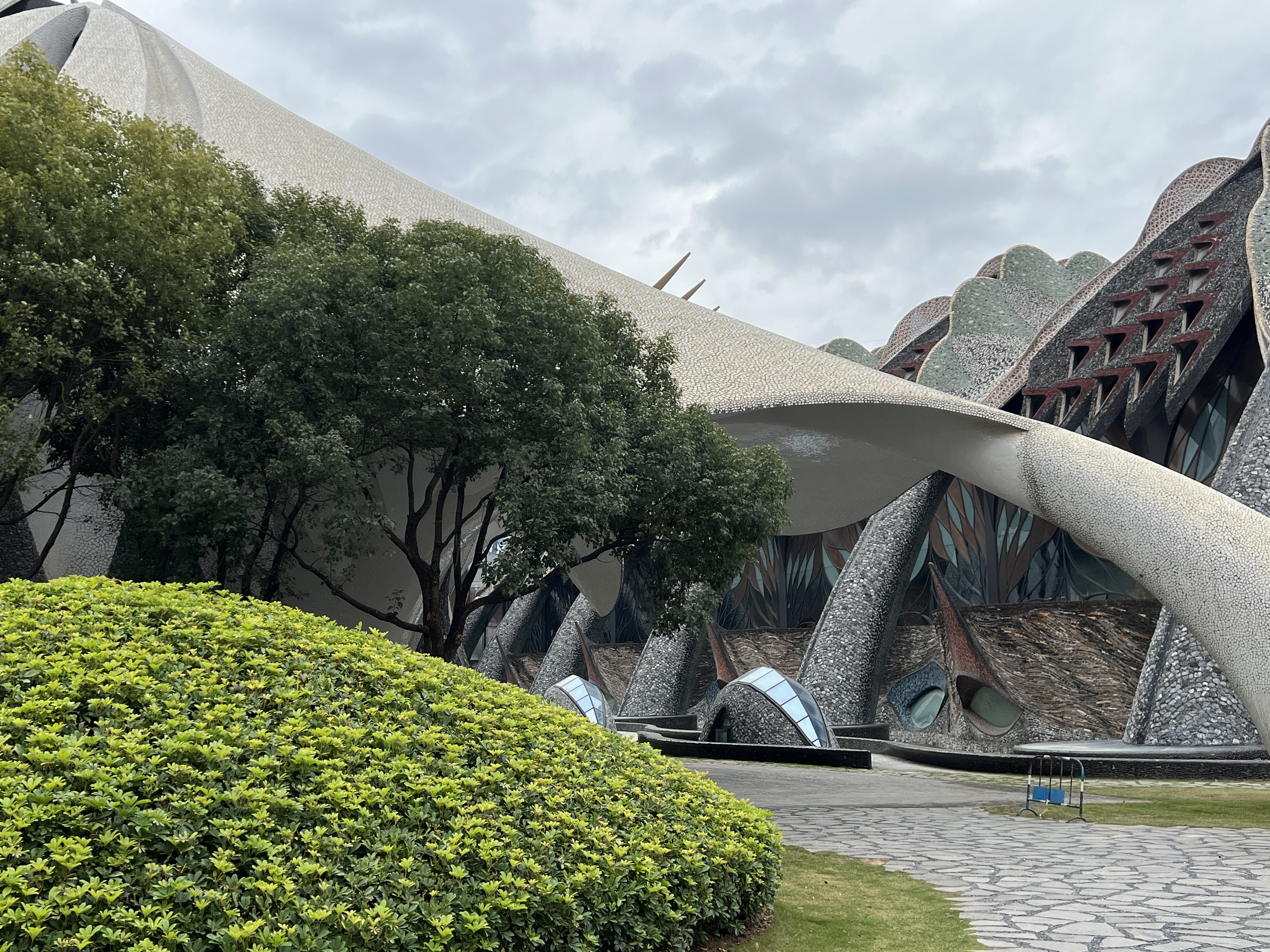

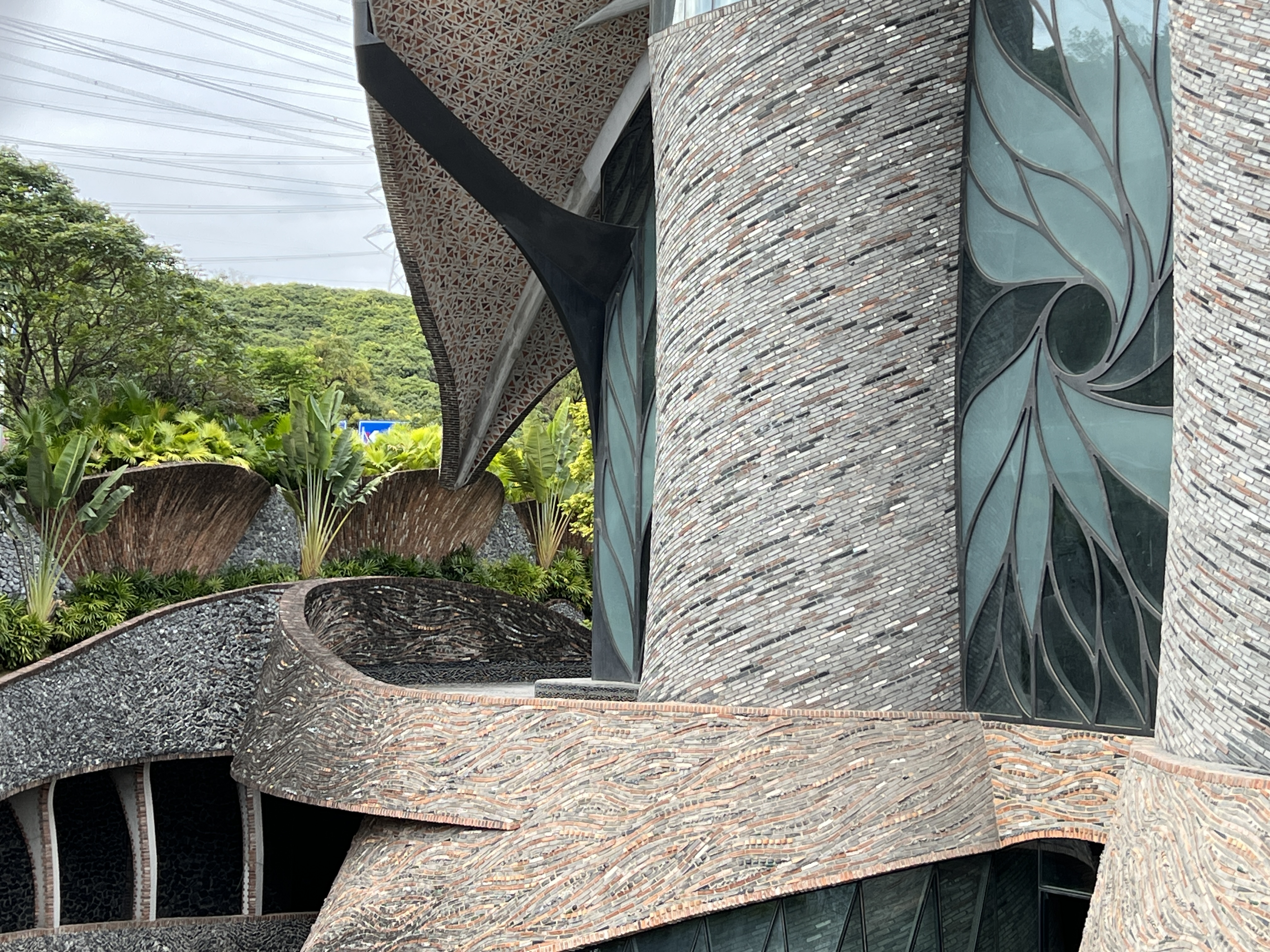

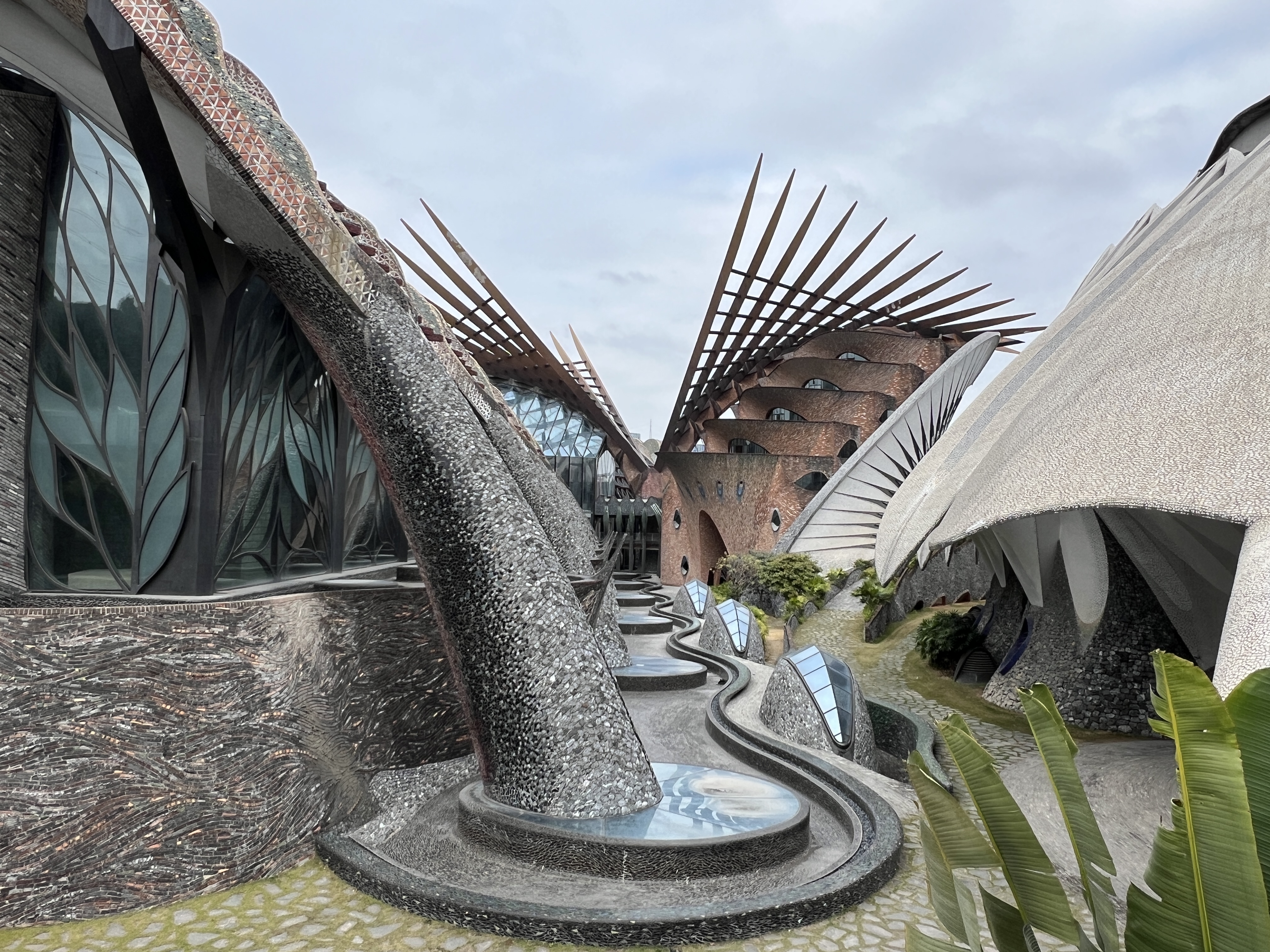

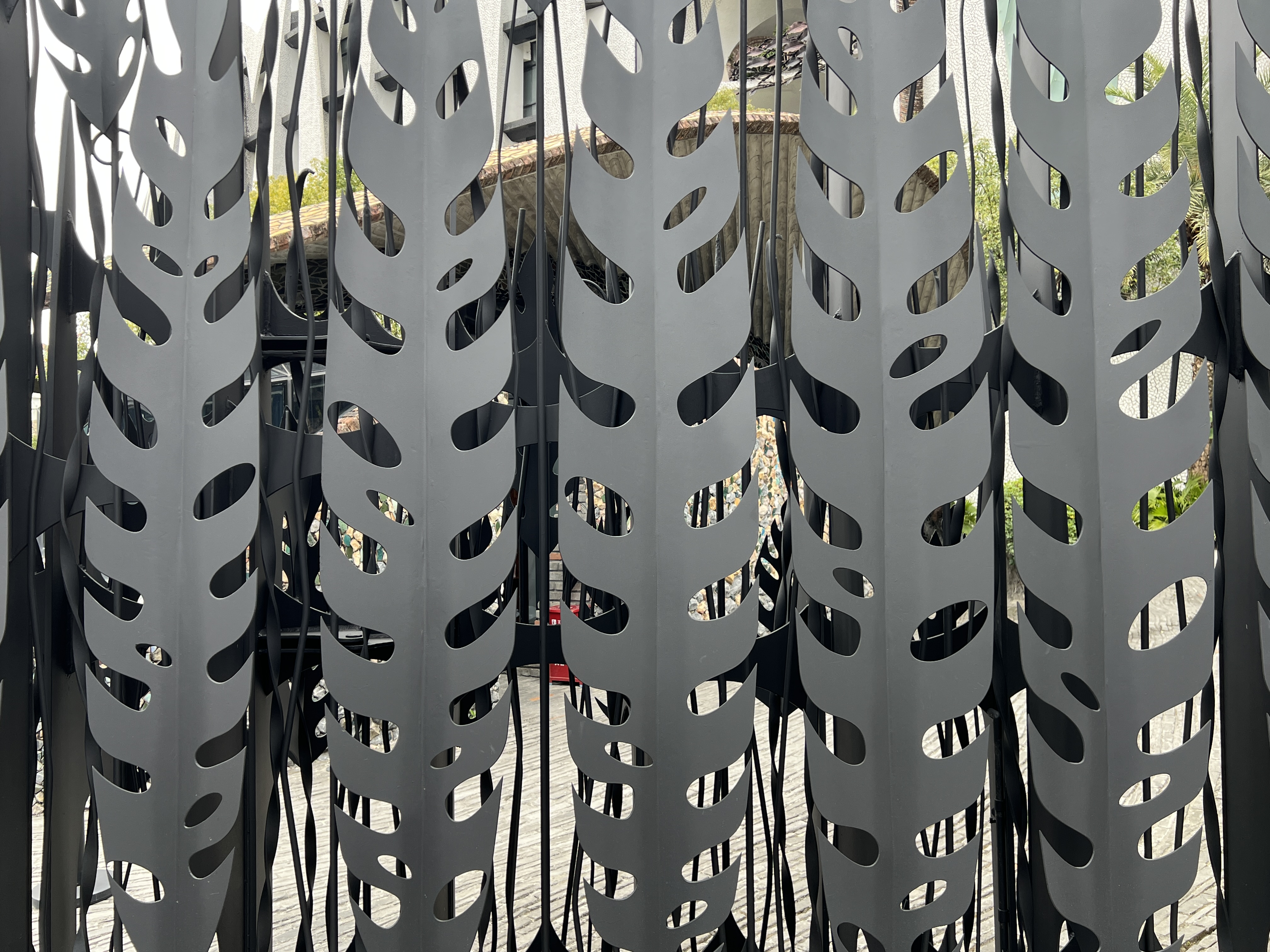
