= List of Chilean pavilions at the Venice Biennale of Architecture =

This is a list of Chilean pavilions at the Venice Biennale of Architecture. The country's participation is determined by an independent jury appointed by the Ministry of Cultures, Arts and Heritage of Chile.

== Exhibitions ==
#	Year	Edition	Curator(s)	Exhibition	Awards	Ref.
1st	2006	10th	Cristian Undurraga	Plaza de la Ciudadanía		
2nd	2008	11th	Sofia von Ellrichshausen, and Mauricio Pezo	I Was Here		
3th	2010	12th	Sebastian Gray and Macarena Cortés	CHILE 8.8		
4th	2012	13th	Pilar Pinchart and Bernardo Valdés	Chilean Soilscapes		
5th	2014	14th	Pedro Alonso and Hugo Palmarola	Monolith Controversies	Silver Lion for Best National Participation	
6th	2016	15th	Juan Román and José Luis Uribe	Against the Tide		
7th	2018	16th	Alejandra Celedón	STADIUM		
8th	2021	17th	Emilio Marín and Rodrigo Sepúlveda	Testimonial Spaces		
9th	2023	18th	Loreto Lyon, Alejandro Beals, and Gonzalo Carrasco	Moving Ecologies		
10th	2025	19th	Serena Dambrosio, Nicolás Díaz Bejarano, and Linda Schilling	Reflective Intelligences		
11th	2027	20th	Rodrigo Santa María, Jael Rodríguez, and Ariel Carrión,	Tijerales		

== See also ==
- Venice Biennale of Architecture
- National pavilions at the Venice Biennale
