= Sofía von Ellrichshausen =

Argentine-Chilean architect (born 1976)

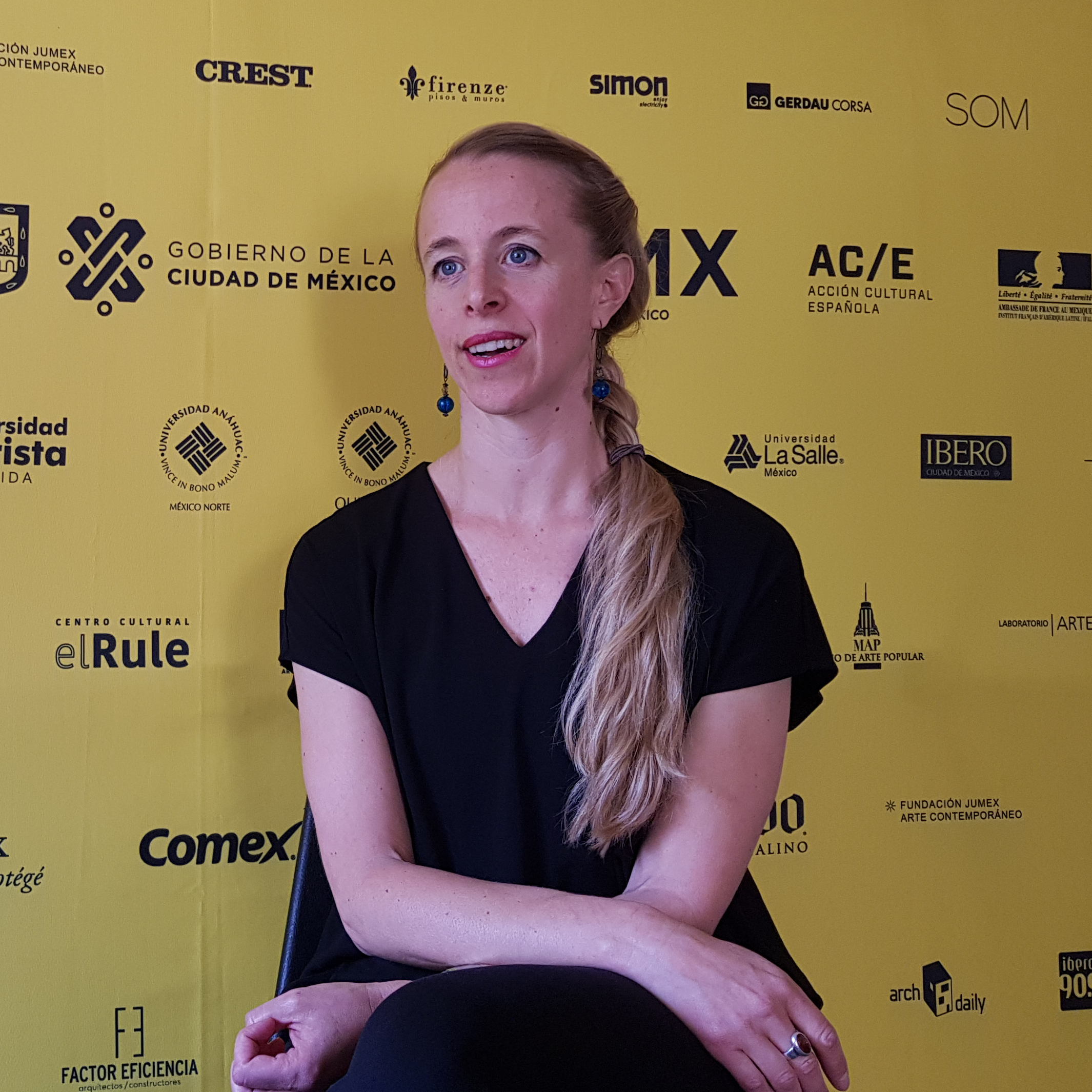
- Sofía von Ellrichshausen at Mextropoli 2019
- Born: 1976 (age 49–50); Bariloche, Argentina
- Education: Universidad de Buenos Aires
- Occupation: Architect
- Notable work: INES Innovation Center; Cien House
- Website: https://pezo.cl/

Sofía von Ellrichshausen (born 1976) is an Argentine-Chilean architect, artist, and educator. In 2002, she co-founded the art and architecture studio «Pezo von Ellrichshausen» in Concepción, Chile, together with Mauricio Pezo.

Their work has been exhibited at the Royal Academy of Arts in London, and the Venice Biennale of Architecture, and is part of the permanent collections of the Art Institute of Chicago and the Museum of Modern Art in New York.

== Education and academia ==
Von Ellrichshausen was born in Bariloche, Argentina, in 1976. She holds a degree in architecture from the Universidad de Buenos Aires. She has taught at Cornell University in Ithaca, New York, Yale University in New Haven, Connecticut, the Illinois Institute of Technology College of Architecture in Chicago, the University of Texas at Austin, and the University of Tokyo in Japan.

== Work ==
Von Ellrichshausen met Chilean architect Mauricio Pezo in Buenos Aires, and together they established an art and architecture studio in Chile.

«Cien House», which the studio built for themselves, is located in a suburb of Concepción, and was highlighted as an example of Chilean Modernist architecture in a 2019 article in The New York Times. «Poli House», designed in 2005, was included in The Guardian's list of "The 10 Best Concrete Buildings," and earned her the "Best Young Chilean Architect Award."

In 2009, The Architectural Review described their design for «Fosc House» as "playful". Together with Pezo, von Ellrichshausen was curator of I Was Here, the Chilean Pavilion at the 2008 Venice Architecture Biennale, and served as a jury member at the 2018 Venice Biennale of Architecture.

The studio's portfolio also includes projects such as Solo House, Rode House, Luna House, Raem House, and the INES Innovation Center, among others.

Her work is part of the permanent collections of the MoMA in New York City, the Santiago Museum of Contemporary Art in Chile, and the Art Institute of Chicago.

== Exhibitions and Presentations ==
- Reporting from the Front, 2016 Venice Biennale of Architecture
- Conceptions of Space, Museum of Modern Art, New York City (2014)
- Sensing Spaces, Royal Academy of Arts, London (2014)

== Publications ==
- Naïve Intention. New York: Actar, 2018
- Av Monographs 199: Pezo von Ellrichshausen—Geometric Abstraction. Madrid: Avisa, 2018
- Pezo von Ellrichshausen—Spatial Structure. Copenhagen: Arkitektur B, 2016

== Awards and honors ==
The studio is a recipient of the Mies Crown Hall Americas Emerge Prize in 2014 for Poli House, the Rice Design Alliance Prize in 2012, and the 2006 Iberoamerican Architecture Biennial Award.
