= Juan Martínez Gutiérrez =

Chilean architect (1901–1976)

Juan Martínez
- Born: February 8, 1901; Bilbao
- Died: January 17, 1976 (aged 74); Santiago
- Education: University of Chile
- Occupation: Architect
- Notable work: Votive Temple of Maipú
- Style: Art Deco

Juan Tomás Martínez Gutiérrez, also known as Juan Martínez (Bilbao, Spain, February 8, 1901 - Santiago, Chile, January 31, 1976) was a Chilean architect awarded the inaugural National Architecture Prize in 1969.

== Education and career ==
Born in Bilbao, Spain, Juan Martínez emigrated with his family, spending some time in Argentina between 1907 and 1909, before finally arriving in Chile that same year.

Martínez enrolled in the Faculty of Architecture at the University of Chile in 1918, graduating in 1922.

In 1928, he traveled to Europe where he remained until 1931, attending the second Bauhaus School and studying the work of the most important architects of that time such as Ludwig Mies van der Rohe, Peter Behrens, Le Corbusier, and Walter Gropius, who would heavily influence his architecture.

His "search for a modernism with local expression" led to projects such as the Faculty of Law of the University of Chile, the Chile Pavilion at the 1929 Ibero-American Exposition in Sevilla, the Votive Temple of Maipú, and the Chilean Army Military School.

Between 1953 and 1956, he participated in the project of the Central Library of the National Autonomous University of Mexico (UNAM) alongside Gustav Saavedra as associates of Mexican architect Juan O'Gorman.

Identified as "one of the most important Chilean architects of the 20th century", he was awarded the inaugural National Architecture Prize of Chile in 1969.
