= Antonia Lehmann =

Chilean architect (born 1955)

- Born: Antonia Lehmann Scasi-Buffa; 1955 (age 70–71); Santiago, Chile
- Education: Pontifical Catholic University of Chile
- Occupation: Architect
- Organization: Izquierdo Lehmann Architects
- Notable work: Cruz del Sur; Manantiales Building
- Awards: National Architecture Award of Chile 2004
- Website: https://www.izquierdolehmann.com/en/

Antonia Lehmann (born 1955) is a Chilean architect and cofounder of Izquierdo Lehmann architecture firm. In 2004, she became the first woman to receive Chile's National Architecture Award.

== Career ==
Lehmann graduated as an architect from Pontifical Catholic University of Chile in 1982. Two years later, together with Luis Izquierdo, she founded Izquierdo Lehmann, an architecture firm based in Santiago, Chile.

Her work has been described as taking "a position of equidistance between vernacular tradition and imported modernity."

In 2010, the President of Chile, Sebastian Piñera, appointed her as Director of the advisory board for the Chilean New Urban Policy, a position she held until 2014. Since then, she has been a member of the National Committee for Urban Development.

== Awards and honors ==
In 2004, Lehmann won the National Architecture Prize in Chile, becoming the first woman to ever achieve this honor.

That same year, the Manantiales building became the only South American project to be featured in Tall Buildings, an exhibition curated by MoMA in New York showcasing "the newest innovations in skyscrapers".
