= Loreto Lyon =

Chilean architect (born 1979)

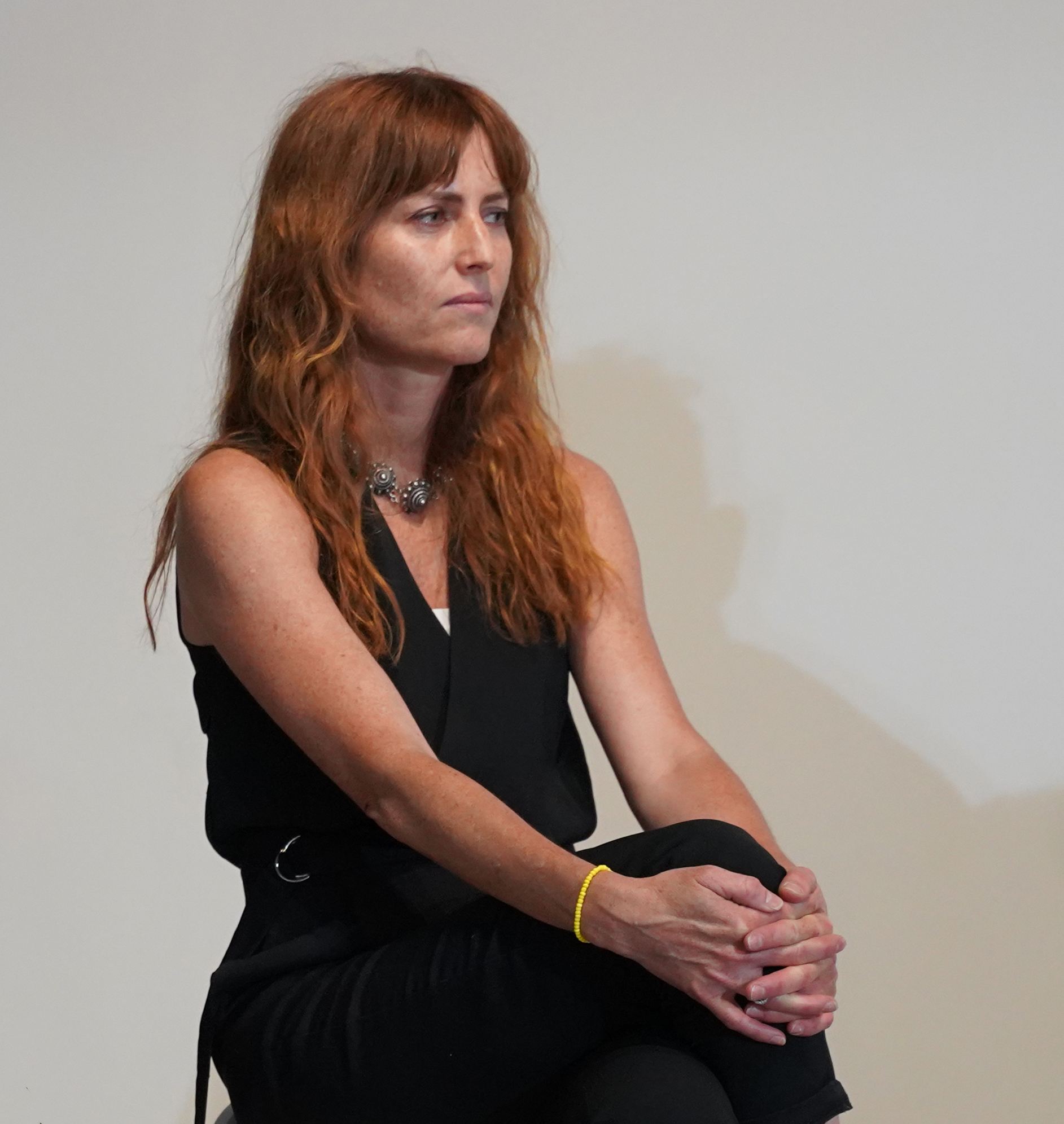
- Born: Santiago
- Education: Pontifical Catholic University of Chile
- Occupation: architect
- Years active: 2005–present
- Notable work: City Hall of Nancagua, Plaza de Armas Station building

Loreto Lyon (born in Santiago in 1979) is a Chilean architect, academic, and co-curator of the Chilean pavilion at the 2023 Venice Architecture Biennale.

== Education ==
Lyon graduated with a degree in architecture from the Pontifical Catholic University of Chile in 2005 and obtained a master's degree in Environmental Design and Engineering from University College London in 2011.

== Career ==
Lyon worked with Chilean architect Smiljan Radic between 2005 and 2010. In 2012, she co-founded Beals Lyon Arquitectos with Alejandro Beals, winning design projects such as the YAP_Constructo 2012 installation, the City Hall of Nancagua, and the new building over the Plaza de Armas Station on Line 3 of the Santiago Metro.

In the academic field, Lyon has been invited as a professor for WAVE, the summer workshop of the Instituto Universitario di Architettura di Venezia in Italy, and workshops at Cornell University in the United States. Moreover, she has been a faculty member at the School of Architecture of the Pontifical Catholic University of Chile since 2012.

In 2022, Lyon became the director of the School of Architecture in Santiago at San Sebastián University. That same year, she was appointed director of the Chile Architecture Biennial, alongside Cristobal Molina.

In 2023, she was chosen as co-curator of the Chilean pavilion at the Venice Architecture Biennale that same year with the proposal Moving Ecologies, alongside Gonzalo Carrasco and Alejandro Beals.
