= Estación Mapocho =

Former railway station and cultural center in Santiago, Chile

Coordinates: 33°25′55.80″S 70°39′16.56″W

Estación Maposho
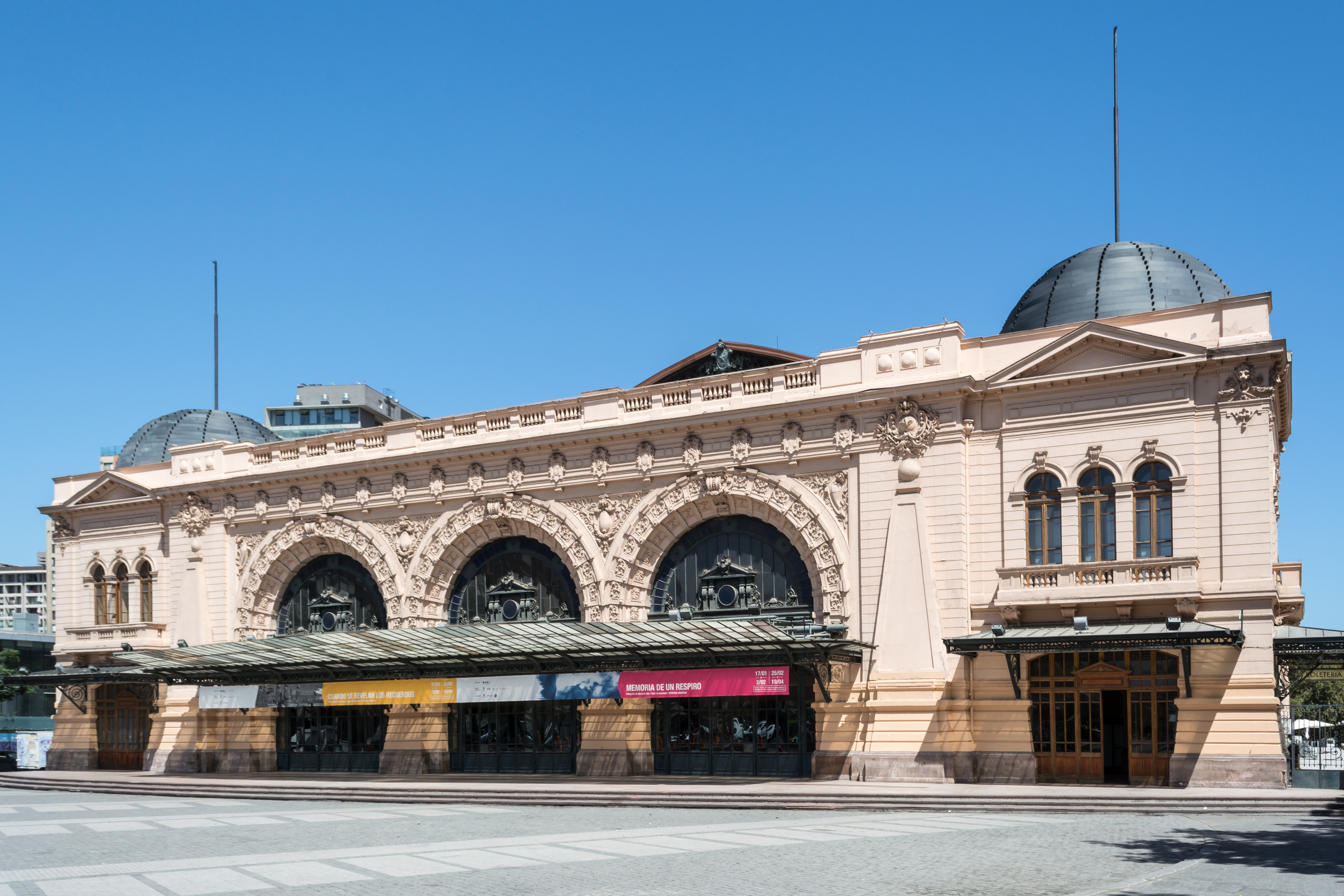
- The facade of the Centro Cultural Estación Mapocho in 2020

General information
- Location: Santiago, Chile
- System: Disused train station

History
- Opened: 1913
- Closed: 1987
- Rebuilt: 1994 (as cultural centre)
Location

Estación Mapocho is a former railway station that has been refitted as a cultural center since 1994, hosting a variety of events in Santiago, Chile.

== History ==
The design and construction of the station began in 1905 at the hands of Emilio Jecquier, a Chilean architect based in France. The 280-metre-long, 17-metre-high structure was composed of a base of masonry and a steel vault covered in glass (now copper). The steel structure was constructed by the Belgian company Haine Saint Pierre. The official inauguration of the station took place on May 12, 1912, and the station opened to the public in 1913.

In many ways, Estación Mapocho is a relic of a significant period in Chilean history when the country was going through major economic and social changes, as well as celebrating its first centenary. The station was one of several civil works commissioned to celebrate the first centenary of Chilean independence, along with the park of Santa Lucía Hill, the Chilean High Court of Justice, and the Chilean National Museum of Fine Arts. The building is located at the intersection of two streets, Presidente Balmaceda and Bandera, on the south bank of the Mapocho River close to the Mercado Central de Santiago. Puente Cal y Canto metro station is beneath the "Plaza de la Cultura", or Culture Square, in front of the station.

For many years, Estación Mapocho was Santiago's main rail hub serving Valparaíso, Argentina and northern Chile, which at the time was the centre of Chile's niter or saltpeter boom.

In recognition of its imposing architecture and its sentimental and historic value, the building was declared a National Monument by law in 1976.

Estación Mapocho through history

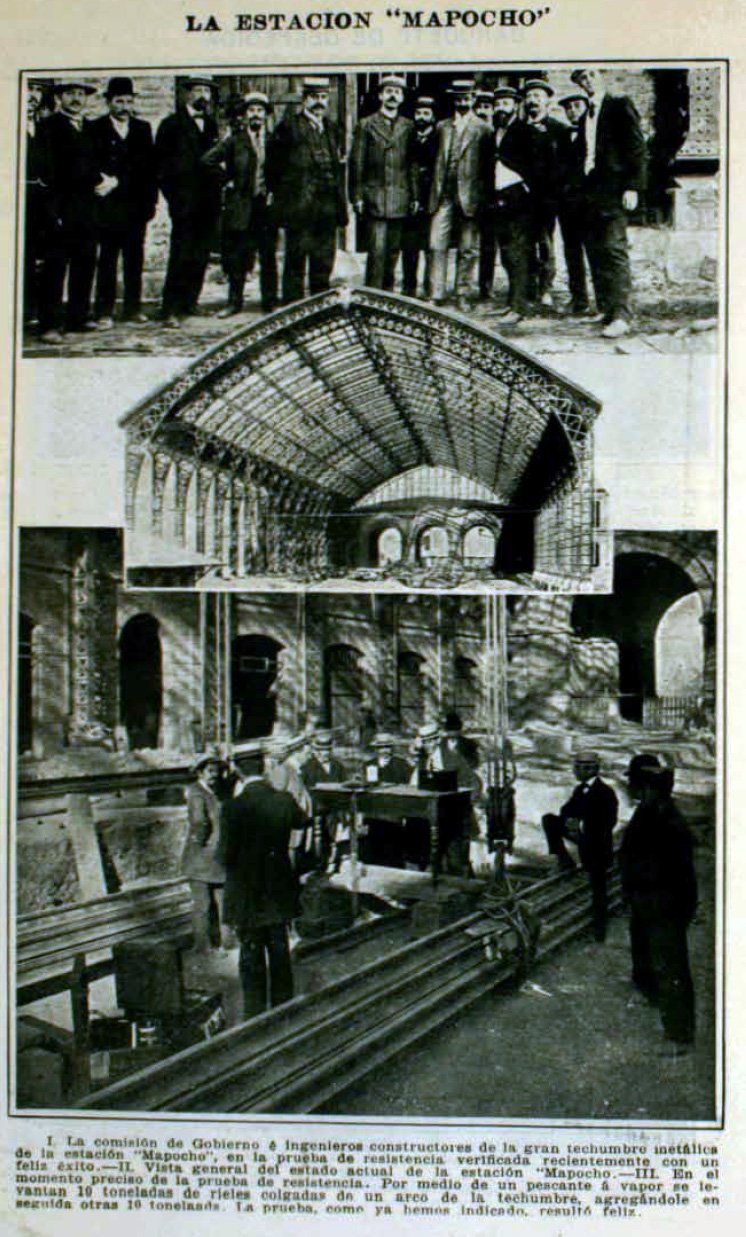
In its construction stage

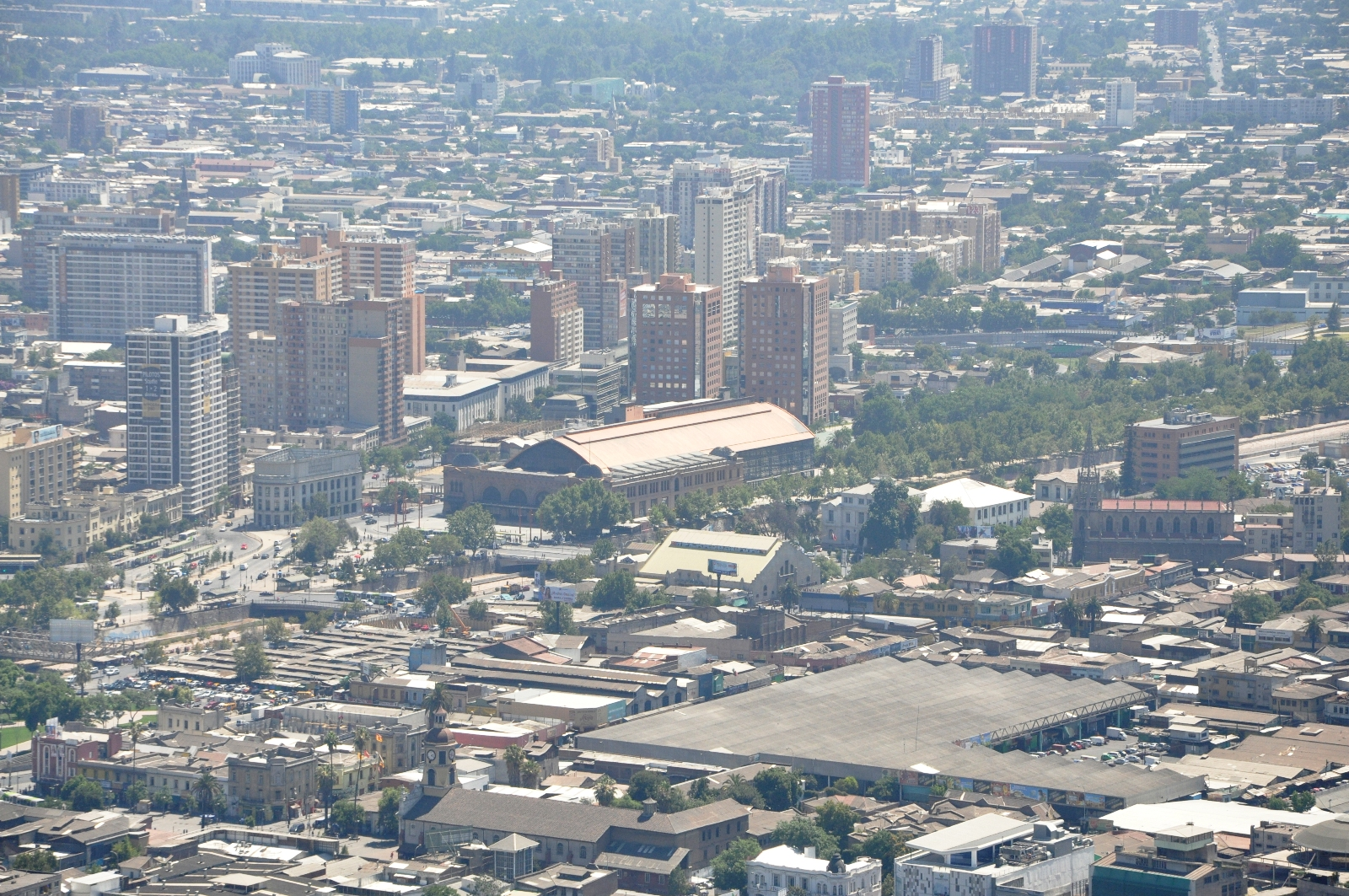
Aerial view of the Estación Mapocho. Image taken from the summit of the San Cristobal Hill.

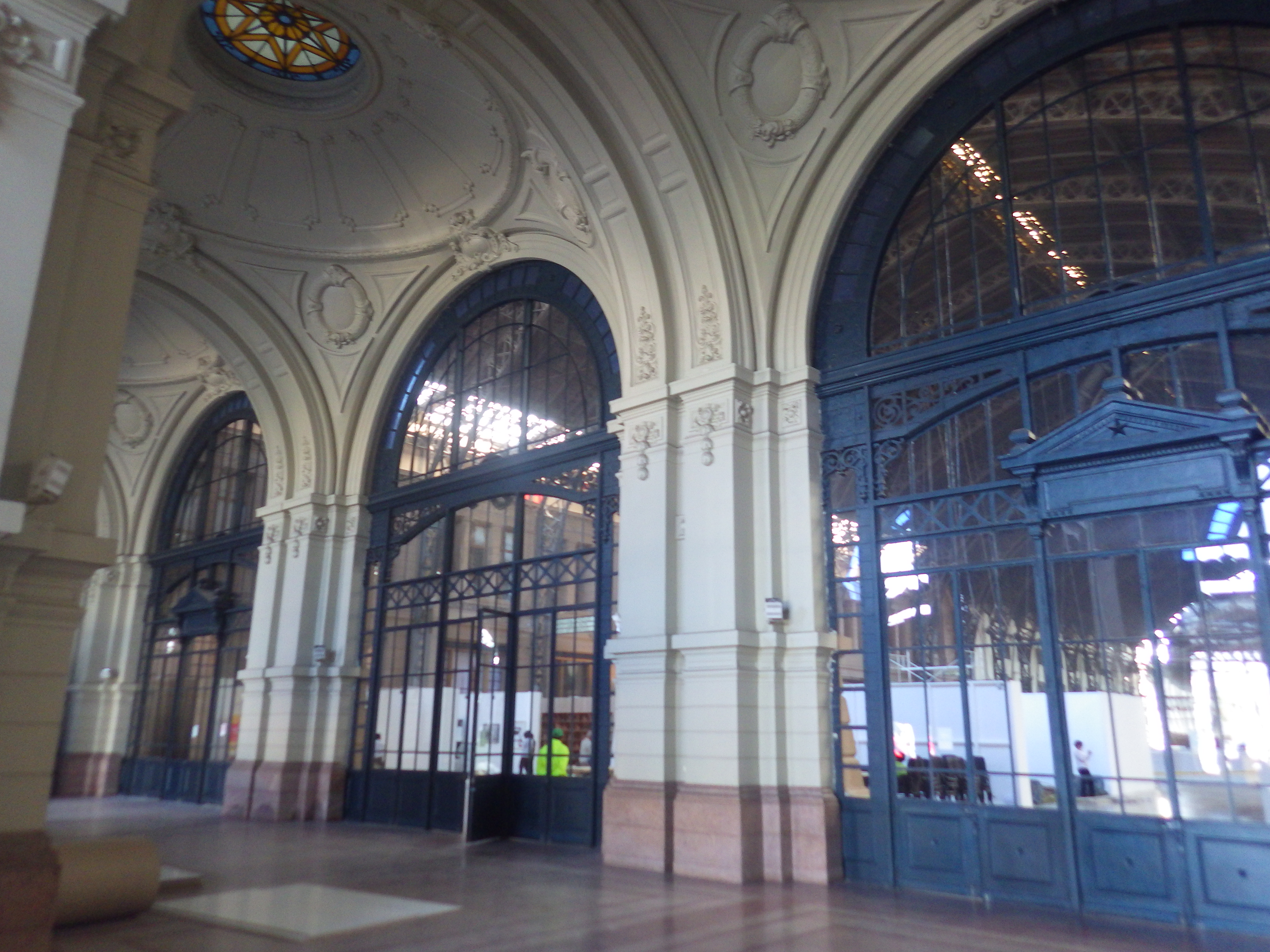
Details of the Interior

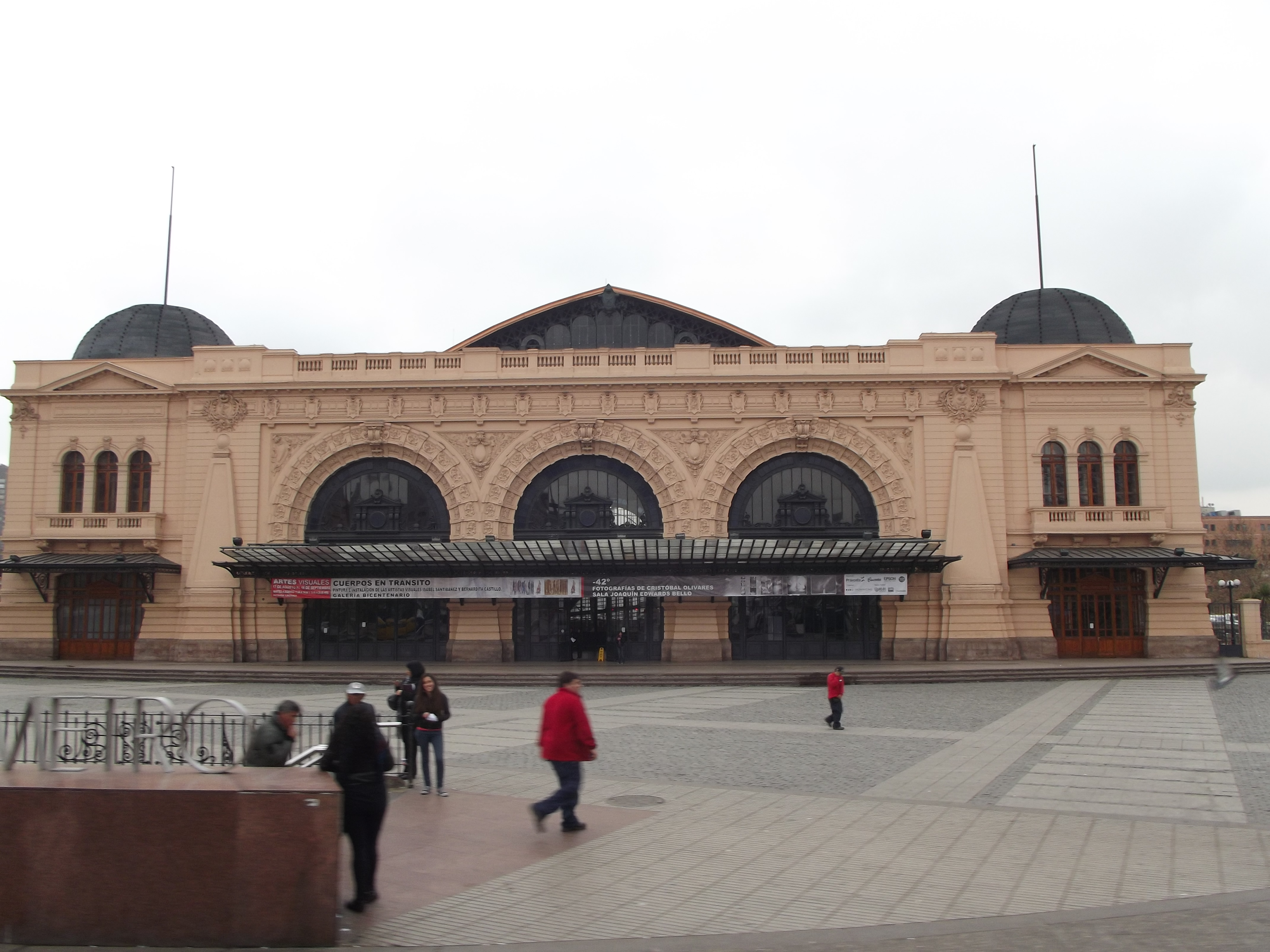
Facade

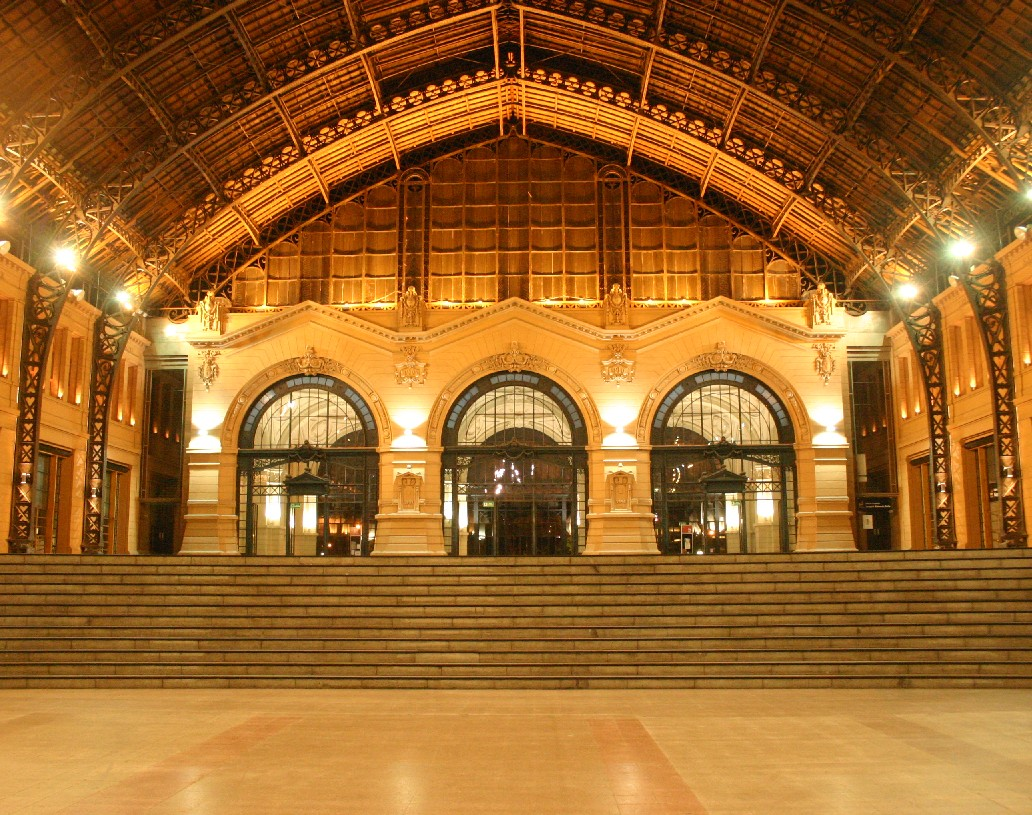
View of the lower hall

In 1986, the station was temporarily closed for remodeling and rail traffic was diverted to Alameda Station, causing great inconvenience to commuters coming from Valparaíso and reducing passenger numbers on the line. The same year, the Queronque rail accident left 58 dead and caused the Santiago–Valparaíso railway line to close. In 1987, the Empresa de Ferrocarriles del Estado (Chile's State Railroad Company or EFE) stopped the remodeling works and Estación Mapocho was decommissioned. The serious structural decay and lack of use caused the station to be abandoned. Since demolition of a national monument is expressly forbidden by law, Empresa de los Ferrocarriles del Estado sold the building to CORFO, Chile's economic growth agency, in 1988.

== Estación Mapocho Cultural Centre ==
In 1991 a non-profit private organization, Corporación Cultural de la Estación Mapocho (Estación Mapocho Cultural Corporation), was commissioned to oversee the redevelopment and management of the building. Sponsored by the "Colegio de Arquitectos" (Architects’ Association), the City of Santiago invited tenders from private organisations to refurbish the building. It was one of the first instances of a private organization managing a public building in Chile, and one of the first cultural projects carried out after Chile's transition to democracy.

Architects Montserrat Palmer, Teodoro Fernández, Ramón López and Rodrigo Pérez de Arce were appointed to carry out the remodeling work. Their proposal involved remodeling the 10,000 square metre space with minimal alteration or disruption, preserving the original work of architect wherever possible. The project cost an estimated 10 million US dollars.

The restoration work was completed by the beginning of 1994, and the new Estación Mapocho Cultural Centre was inaugurated on March 3, 1994. Today, the centre is a heritage site dedicated to the promotion of culture in Chile. The building serves as venue for cultural events such as art exhibitions, musical performances and conventions. The Santiago International Book Fair is held at the cultural centre every year in late spring.

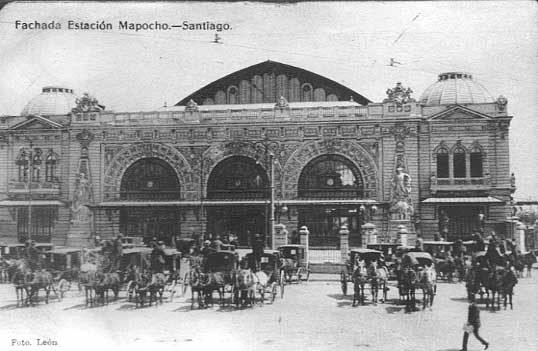
During the nineteenth century, Estación Mapocho was an obligatory stop for international travellers, who went from Santiago to Valparaíso by train, and from there, by ocean, to rest of the world.

The centre's success in promoting and preserving the heritage of Chile was recognised when it won the City Heritage Award in 2005, its 100th anniversary as a building and 15th anniversary as a cultural centre. It also received the Reina Sofía International Award for Conservation and Restoration of Cultural Heritage in 2008.

== See also ==
- Culture of Chile
- Music of Chile
