= Quinta Normal =

- City and Commune
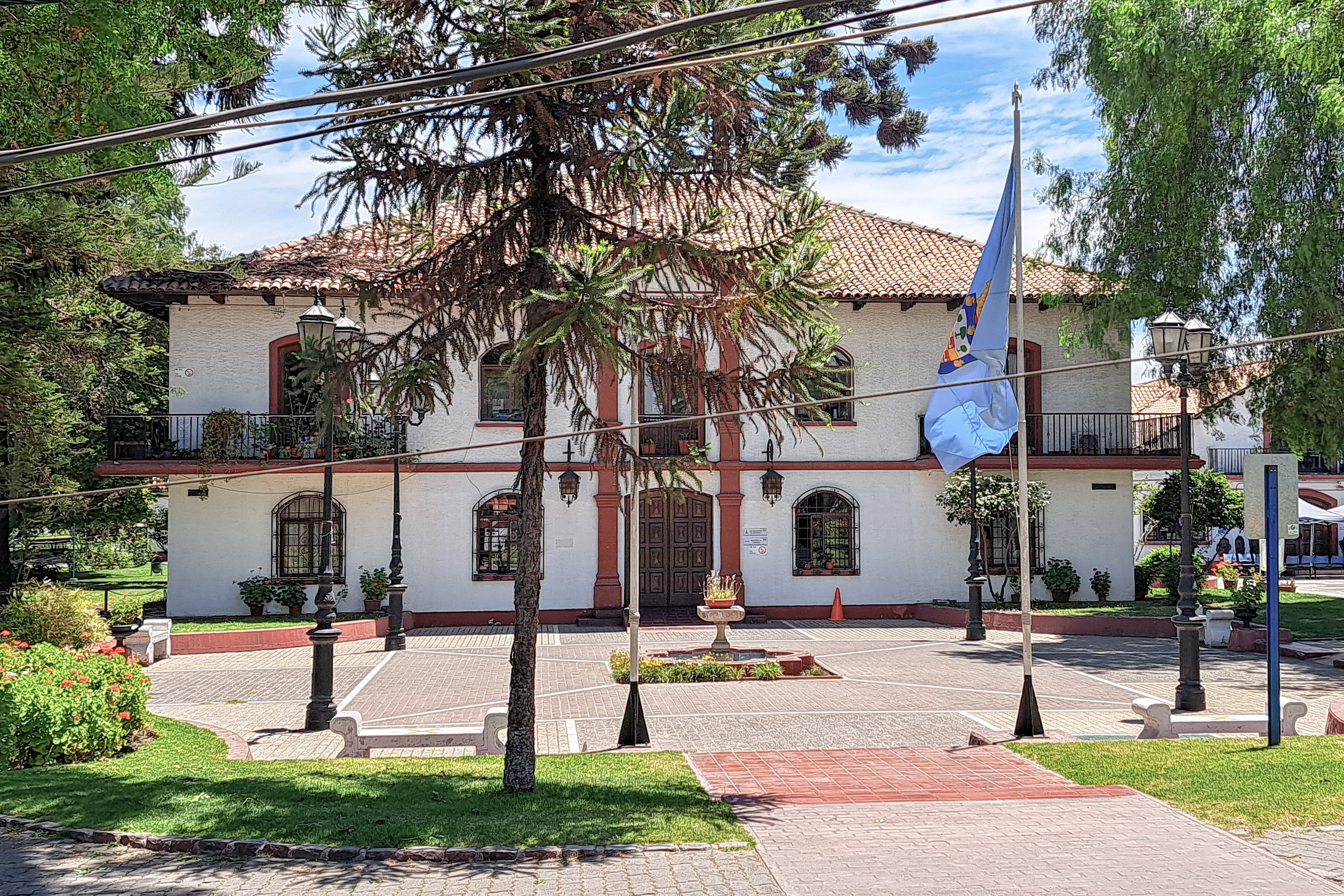
- City Hall

- Coat of arms Map of Quinta Normal commune within Greater Santiago Location in Chile
- Coordinates (city): 33°25.7′S 70°42′W
- Country: Chile
- Region: Santiago Metro
- Province: Santiago

Government
  - Type: Municipality
  - Alcalde: Karina Delfino Mussa (PS)

Area
  - Total: 13 km^{2} (5.0 sq mi)

Population (2025 Census)
  - Total: 141,823
  - Density: 11,000/km^{2} (28,000/sq mi)
  - Urban: 141,823
  - Rural: 0

Sex
  - Men: 70,073
  - Women: 71,750
- Time zone: UTC-4 (CLT)
  - Summer (DST): UTC-3 (CLST)
- Area code: 56 +
- Website: Municipality of Quinta Normal

Quinta Normal is a commune of Chile located in Santiago Province, Santiago Metropolitan Region. It is named after Quinta Normal Park, which lies directly on the border between Quinta Normal and Santiago Centro, although the park itself is located within the Santiago commune.

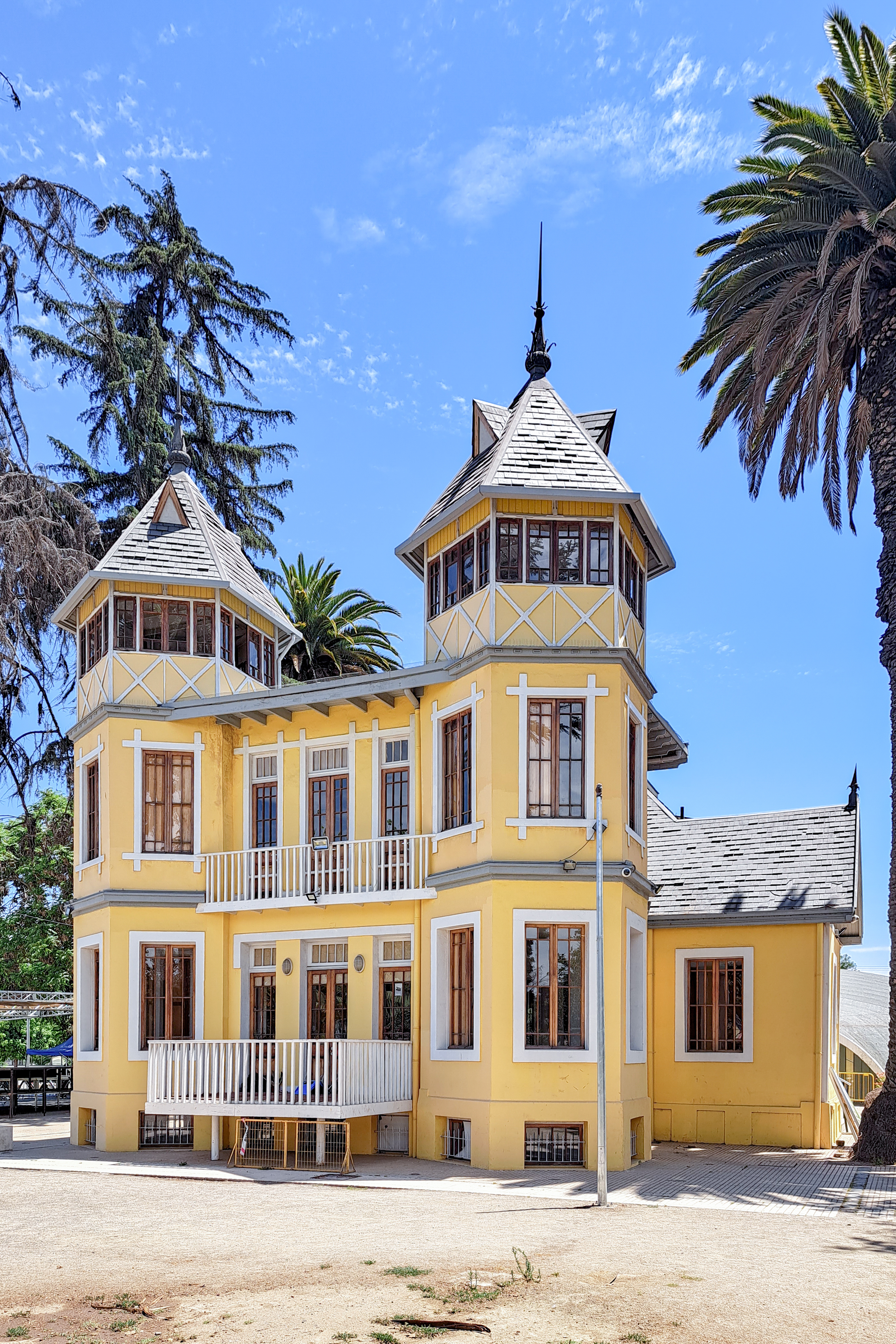
Casona Dubois Cultural Center

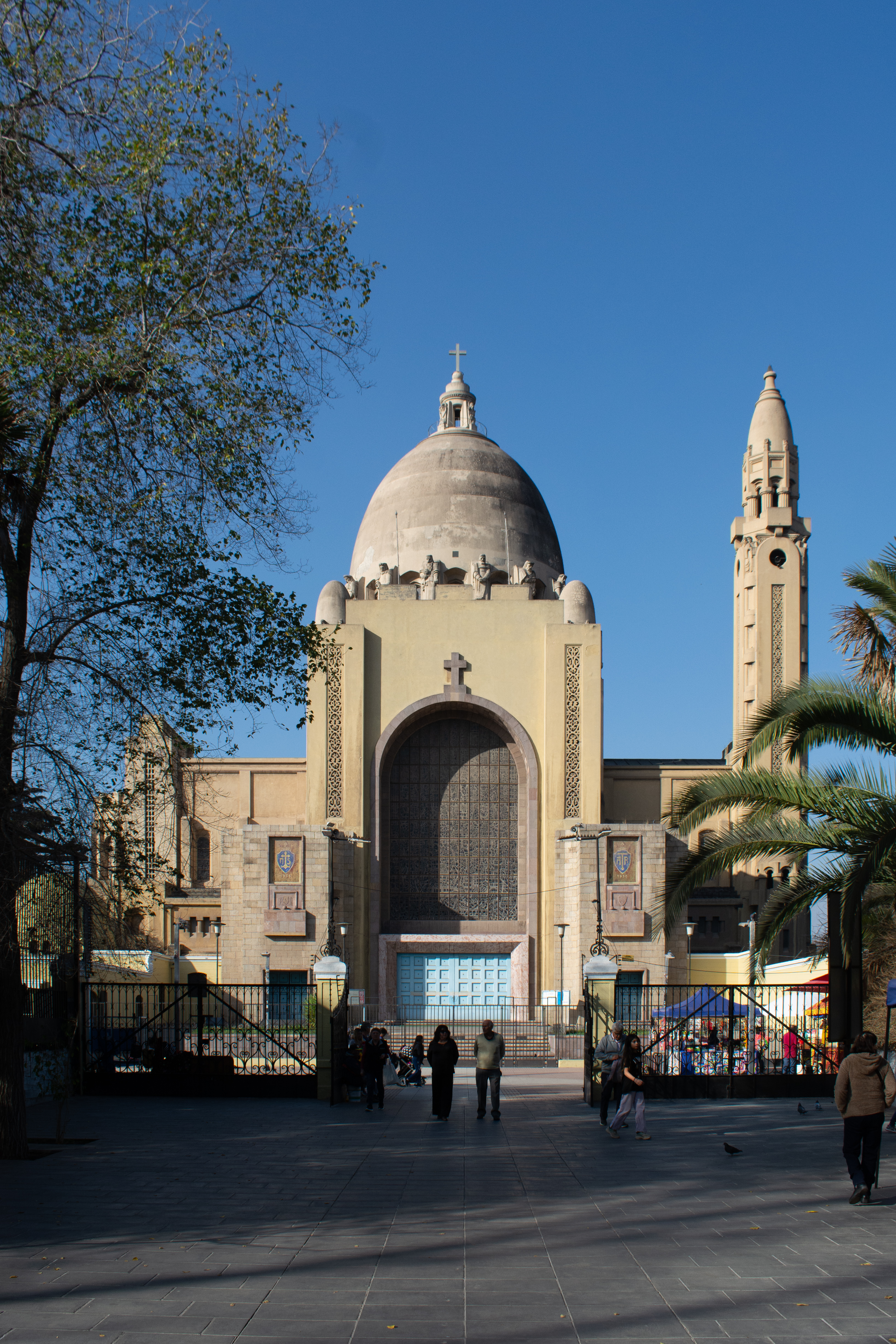
Basílica de Nuestra Señora de Lourdes de Santiago

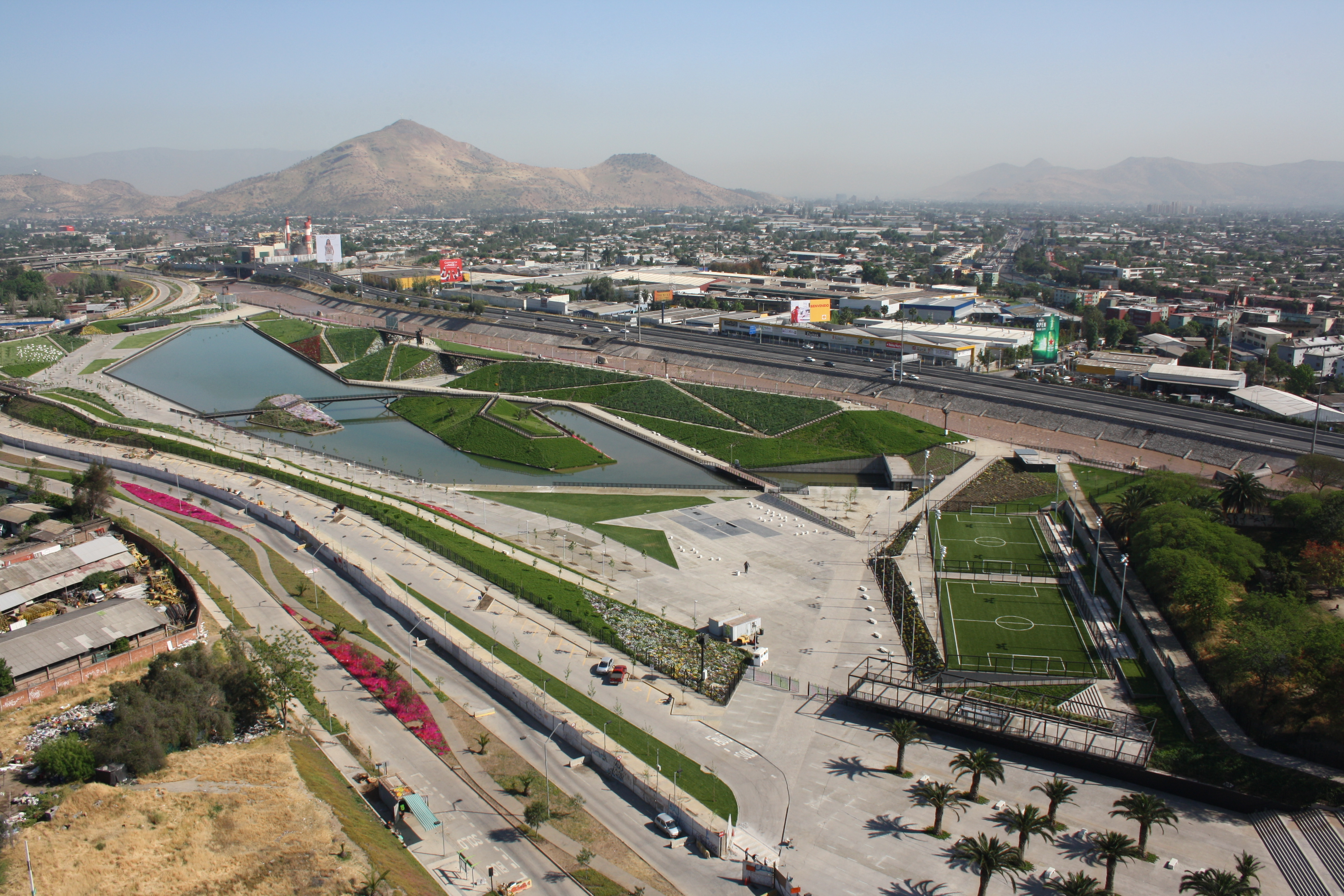
Parque de la Familia

== Demographics ==
According to the 2025 census of the National Statistics Institute, Quinta Normal spans an area of 13 km^{2} (5 sq mi) and has 141,823 inhabitants (70,073 men and 71,750 women), and the commune is an entirely urban area

=== Statistics ===
- Population: 95,597 (2006 projection)
- Average annual household income: US$17,919 (PPP, 2006)
- Population below poverty line: 10.8% (2006)
- Regional quality of life index: 77.01, mid-high, 19 out of 52 (2005)
- Human Development Index: 0.723, 87 out of 341 (2003)

== Administration ==
As a commune, Cerro Navia is a third-level administrative division of Chile administered by a municipal council, headed by an alcalde who is directly elected every four years. The 2024-2028 alcalde is Karina Delfino Mussa (PS). The communal council has the following members:

- Valentina Tapia Escobar (FA)
- Javier Robles Bernal (FA)
- Yohanna Cáceres Lloncon (PS)
- Antonieta Flores Miranda (PS)
- Nicolás Jaramillo Méndez (UDI)
- Carla Salazar Tapia (UDI)
- Hilda Landeros Gallardo (RN)
- Alex Muñoz Viscarra (REP)

Within the electoral divisions of Chile, Quinta Normal was dissolved as a district. Its last representatives in the Chamber of Deputies were Nicolás Monckeberg (RN) and Cristina Girardi (PPD).
