= Teodoro Fernández Larrañaga =

Chilean architect

Teodoro Fernández
- Born: Teodoro Fernández Larrañaga; 11 April 1948 (age 78); San Sebastián, Spain
- Education: Pontifical Catholic University of Chile
- Occupation: Architect
- Awards: 2014 National Architecture Award
- Projects: Bicentennial Park, Centro Cultural Estación Mapocho

Teodoro Fernández Larrañaga (born 11 April 1948) is a Chilean architect. In 2014, he received the National Architecture Award in Chile.

== Education and career ==
Fernández was born in San Sebastián, and immigrated to Chile when he was very young with his parents and siblings. He graduated as an architect from the Pontifical Catholic University of Chile in 1972. Later, he relocated to Madrid to continue his studies. He has taught as a professor at the University of Desarrollo, University of Concepción, Ricardo Palma University in Lima, and the National University of La Plata in Argentina.

In 1998, he led the winning team of the public competition called by the City Council of Vitacura to design the Bicentennial Park, situated on the banks of the Mapocho River. Construction began in 2006, and it was inaugurated in two stages: the first, covering 18 hectares, opened to the public in 2007. Then, in November 2011, the second and final phase was inaugurated.

In 2014 he received the National Architecture Award of Chile.

== Selected works ==
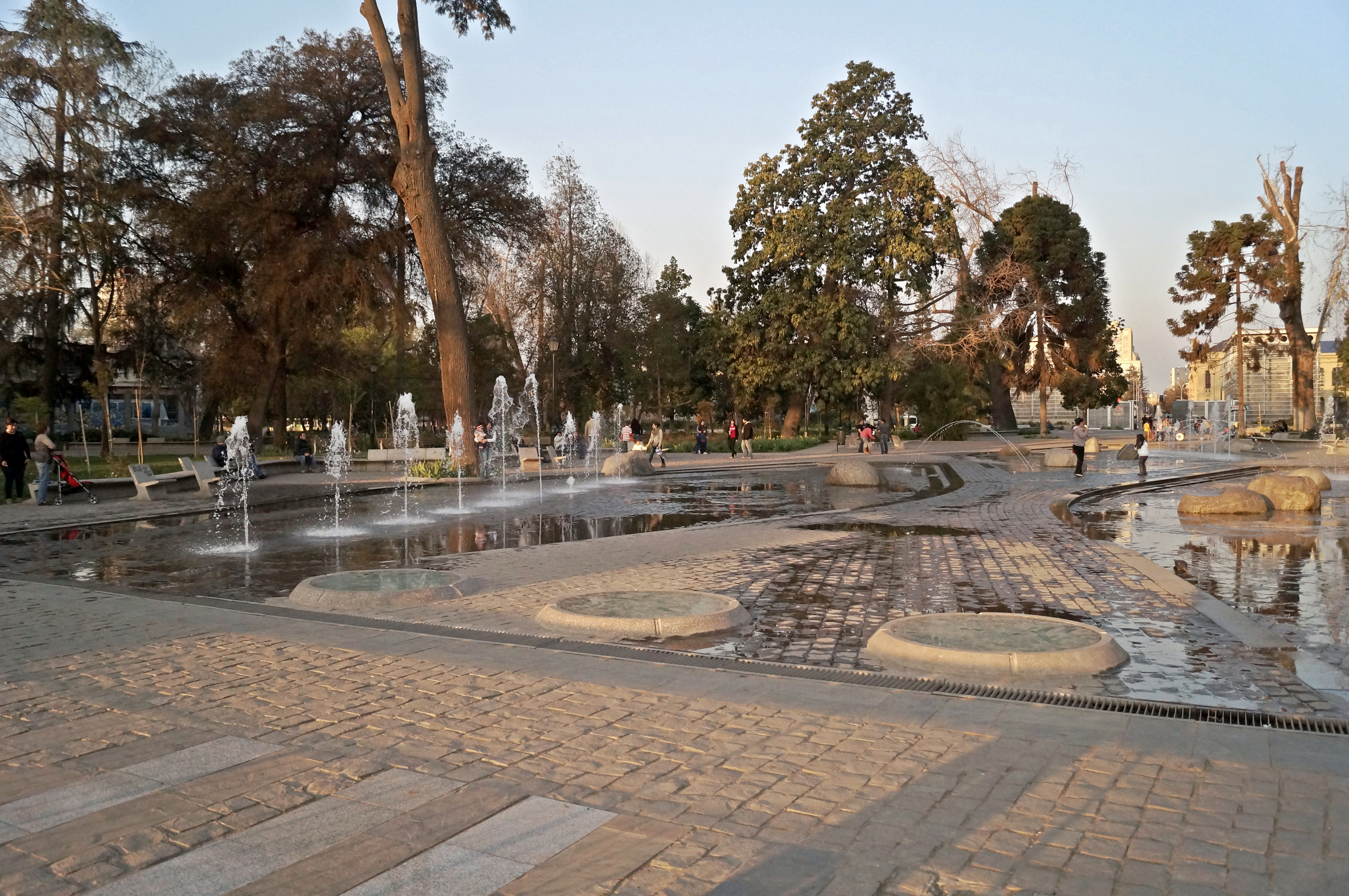
Quinta Normal Park refurbishment in Santiago

- Centro Cultural Estación Mapocho Refurbishment. Santiago, Chile
- Bicentennial Park, Vitacura, Santiago, Chile
- Quinta Normal Refurbishment. Santiago, Chile
- Parque Inés de Suárez. Santiago, Chile
- Kaukari Urban Park. Copiapo, Chile
