= Juan Ignacio Baixas Figueras =

Chilean architect and designer

- Born: 1942
- Occupation: Architect

Juan Ignacio Baixas Figueras (born 1942) is a Chilean architect and designer. Baixas studied architecture at the Pontifical Catholic University of Chile, where he teaches. He is a practising architect, and has an architectural firm with his partner, Enrique del Rio.

== Career ==
Baixa's work as an architect and designer is part of the permanent collection of the Museum of Modern Art. The collection includes La casa de la Dehesa (His first architectural project, created with Rita Mingo), and the puzzle chair that was part of the exhibition Latin America In Construction: Architecture 1955–1980.
