= Votive Temple of Maipú =

Catholic basilica in Santiago, Chile

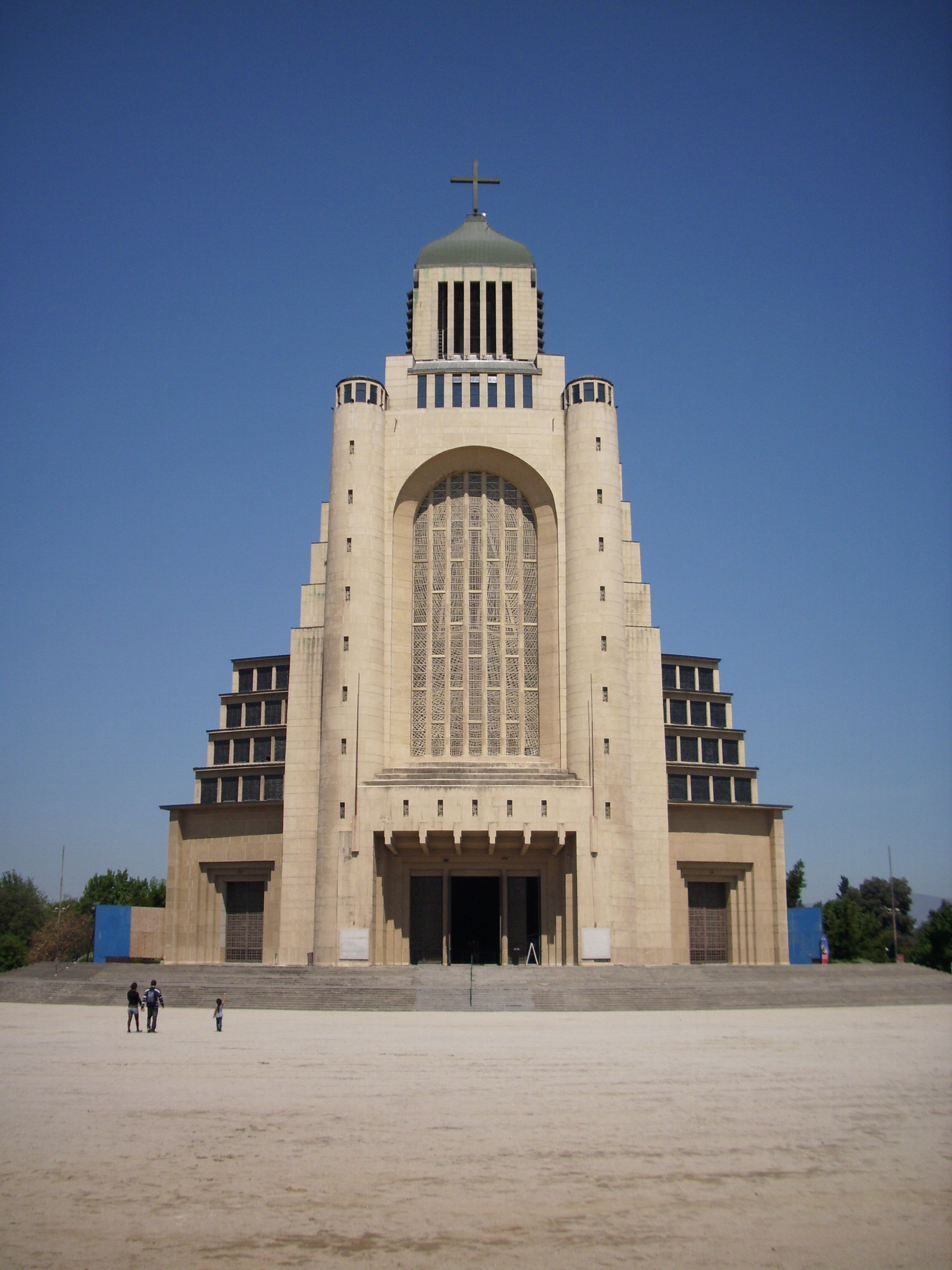
Entrance to the sanctuary

The Votive Temple of Maipú (Spanish: Templo Votivo de Maipú) or Basilica of Our Lady of Mount Carmel (Spanish: Basílica de Nuestra Señora del Carmen) is a Catholic church located in the Chilean commune of Maipú. The height of this basilica is 300 feet tall (91 Meters). Its construction was ordered by Bernardo O'Higgins in 1818 as a thanksgiving to Our Lady of Mount Carmel for the intercession for the victory of the Chilean Army in the Battle of Maipú, where the Independence of Chile was assured. It is called votive because of the vows that O'Higgins made to the Virgin Mary.

== History ==
After its construction was decreed on May 7, 1818, on November 15 the same year the first stone was laid and blessed for the Victory Chapel or Votive Church of Maipú. After 64 years of intermittent construction due to lack of resources, the old church was solemnly inaugurated. The 1906 Valparaíso earthquake ruined the church, making rebuilding necessary. On December 8, 1942, the Marian congress held in Santiago reached unanimous agreement to build a great sanctuary in Maipú on the site of the old Chapel of Victory, to honor Our Lady of Mount Carmel.

On July 16, 1948, the feast of Our Lady of Mount Carmel, Archbishop of Santiago Monsignor José María Caro ordered the construction of the new building designed by Juan Martínez Gutiérrez. In the long years building the present church, some Catholic groups such as Iglesia Joven and Clandestina opposed the project an excess, proposing to instead donate construction funds to the poorest of Archdiocese of Santiago and the rest of Chile. The work was delayed due to lack of resources, but it was finally inaugurated on October 24, 1974 thanks to the Fundación Nacional Voto O'Higgins (on which the church still depends).

Initially, the project was envisioned to be a large mausoleum for the remains of Heroes of the Homeland and notable Chileans, similar to the Panthéon in Paris, but the Church opposed this plan and preferred a shrine, dedicated exclusively to Catholic worship and spiritual care of pilgrims.

On November 23, 1974, the Bishops of Chile, presided over by Cardinal-Archbishop of Santiago, Monsignor Raúl Silva Henríquez, consecrated the church. On October 26, 1984, the church was declared a historical monument by Supreme Decree No. 645. On January 27, 1987, the church was raised to the rank of minor basilica.

== The image ==
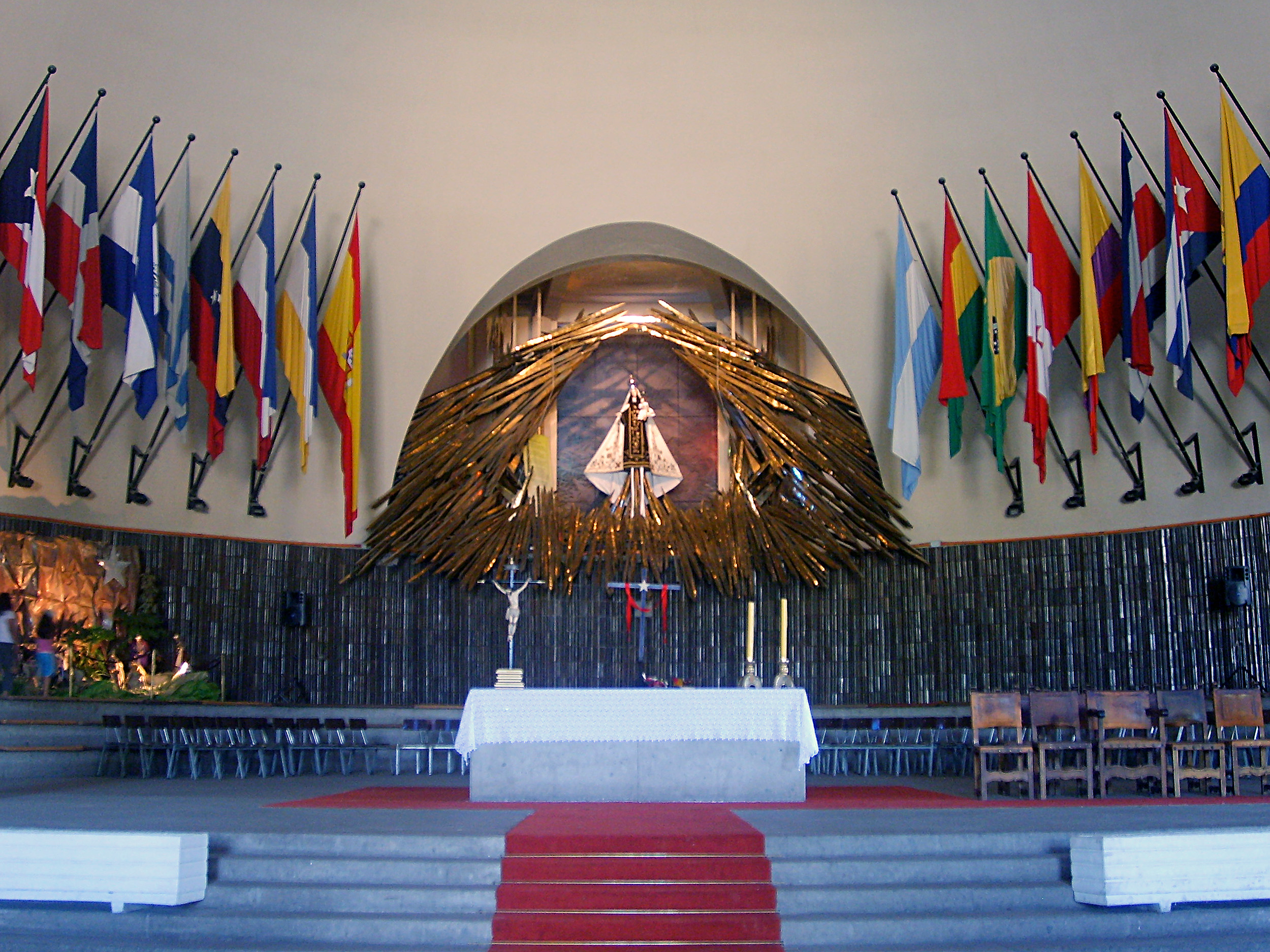
The image of Our Lady of Mount Carmel in the main altar

The image of Our Lady of Mount Carmel enshrined in the church is a wooden sculpture brought to Chile in 1785 by Martín de Lecuna for his oratory. The image was donated to the Cardinal-Archbishop of Santiago, Monsignor José María Caro, by Doña Rosalía Mujica de Gutiérrez, a descendant of Don Martín de Lecuna, in August 1945.

On April 3, 1987, the image was crowned Queen and Patroness of Chile by Pope John Paul II during his apostolic visit to Chile, ratifying the older decree of Pope Pius XI in 1923 that granted such distinction.

== Observation deck and museum ==
Just beneath the roof of the central belfry (63 m (207 ft) high) is an observation deck offering panoramas of southwest Santiago, and the ruins of the old Chapel of Victory in the plaza below. The 300 m^{2} (3,200 sq ft) space was inaugurated on April 3, 2012, the twenty-fifth anniversary of Pope John Paul II's apostolic visit to Chile. Accessible by lift or a flight of 323 steps, it has audiovisual presentations for visitors, and in the centre is a compass rose indicating the directions of Marian sanctuaries around the world.

Under the main sanctuary is the Museo del Carmen, displaying liturgical items and historical artefacts from the site.
