= Cristián Undurraga =

Chilean architect

Cristián Undurraga (born October 13, 1954, in Santiago, Chile) is a Chilean architect.

== Early life ==
He graduated from Pontificia Universidad Católica de Chile in 1977.

== Career ==
In 1978 he founded Undurraga Deves Studio. Among his foundational works is the ‘House on a Hill’.

In 2009 Undurraga was recognized as Honorary Fellow of the American Institute of Architects.
