= Venice Biennale of Architecture =

Biennial architecture expo in Italy

Venice Biennale of Architecture Biennale Architettura
- Genre: Biennale, architecture
- Frequency: Biennial, odd-numbered years since 2021 (even-numbered years 2000–2018)
- Locations: Venice, Italy
- Inaugurated: 1980; 46 years ago
- Most recent: 2025
- Next event: 2027
- Website: www.labiennale.org/en/architecture/

The Venice Biennale of Architecture (Italian: Mostra di Architettura di Venezia) is an international exhibition showcasing architectural works from around the world, held in Venice, Italy, every other year.

Originally held in even-numbered years until 2018, the event was postponed in 2020 due to the COVID-19 pandemic and rescheduled for 2021, shifting the calendar to odd-numbered years. It forms the architecture section of the broader Venice Biennale and was officially established in 1980, although architecture had been included in the Venice Art Biennale since 1968.

The Biennale is divided into two main sections: the permanent national pavilions located in the Giardini della Biennale, and the Arsenale, which hosts projects from numerous countries under one roof.

== History ==
In 1975, during the presidency of Carlo Ripa di Meana, the first initiative towards an architecture exhibition was taken with the Exhibition «A proposito del Mulino Stucky», curated by Vittorio Gregotti. In 1980, the Architecture department was established during the presidency of Giuseppe Galasso, who appointed Paolo Portoghesi as its first director.

== See also ==
- List of architecture prizes
- Asplund Pavilion
- Nordic Pavilion
- American Pavilion
- List of Chilean pavilions at the Venice Biennale of Architecture
