= African American Architects: A Biographical Dictionary, 1865–1945 =

American biographical dictionary from 2004

- Editor: Dreck Spurlock Wilson
- Publisher: Routledge
- Publication date: January 12, 2004
- ISBN: 978-0-415-92959-2

African American Architects: A Biographical Dictionary, 1865–1945 is an American biographical dictionary with a focus on the history of previously overlooked African American architects, the book was edited by Dreck Spurlock Wilson and published in the first edition on January 12, 2004, by Routledge.

The book features 151 profiles, of which 9 are women. Some of the earliest building designs in this book date back to 1865, however there are possibly earlier African American architects.

== Authorship ==
Dozens of contributors wrote about the architects included. Dreck Spurlock Wilson who edited and authored some of the book, is an architect who graduated in 1971 from Iowa State University, and with a M.A. degree in 1975 in urban studies from the University of Chicago. He has written for historical journals and written other books on African-American history, art, and architecture. He is African American. In 2004 he was interviewed about the book on NPR. Wilson also authored Julian Abele; Architect and the Beaux Arts (2019), about Julian Abele.

== People profiled in the book ==
=== African American women architects ===
- Elizabeth Carter Brooks
- Georgia Louise Harris Brown
- Alberta Jeannette Cassell Butler
- Alma Fairfax Murray Carlisle
- Mary Ramsay Brown Channel
- Martha Ann Cassell Thompson
- Ethel Madison Bailey Furman
- Beverly Lorraine Greene
- Amaza Lee Meredith
- Helen Eugenia Parker

=== African American male architects ===
- Julian Francis Abele
- Archibald Alphonso Alexander
- Romulus Cornelius Archer Jr.
- Walter Thomas Bailey
- Lester Oliver Bankhead
- Louis Harvey Bank
- Carl Eugene Barnett
- Joseph Manual Bartholomew Sr.
- Robert Charles Bates
- Louis Arnett Stuart Bellinger
- Plympton Ross Berry
- Edward Eginton Birch
- Ernest Octavuis Birch
- John Henry Blanche
- Joseph Haygood Blodgett
- Henry Clifford Boles
- Cyril Garner Bow
- Charles Sumner Bowman
- Thomas Wilson Boyde Jr.
- Calvin Thomas Stowe Brent
- John Edmonson Brent
- Sanford Augustus Brookins
- Albert Grant Brown
- Grafton Tyler Brown
- Leroy John Henry Brown
- Richard Lewis Brown
- Robert Lester Buffins
- Albert Irvin Cassell
- Charles Irvin Cassell
- William Emmett Coleman Jr.
- Julian Abele Cook Sr.
- Ralph Victor Cook
- William Wilson Cooke
- Clarence Cross
- William Jefferson Decatur
- Henry Beard Delany
- Charles Edgar Dickinson
- Clyde Martin Drayton
- Charles Sumner Duke
- DeWitt Sanford Dykes Sr.
- Gaston Alonzo Edwards
- Curtis Graham Elliott
- Daniel J. Farrar Sr.
- Arthur Wilfred Ferguson
- George Alonzo Ferguson
- Robert Lionel Fields
- Orpheus Hodge Fisher
- Wade Alston Ford
- George Washington Foster Jr.
- Louis Edwin Fry Sr.
- James Homer Garrott
- Lewis Wentworth Giles Jr.
- Lewis Wentworth Giles Sr.
- Jasminius Wilsonni Rudolphus Grandy III
- Francis Eugene Griffin
- Calvin Pazavia Hamilton
- Richard Mason Hancock
- Clinton Stevens Harris
- Isaiah Truman Hatton
- William Augustus Hazel
- Cornelius Langston Henderson Sr.
- Joseph E. Hill
- Leroy Hilliard
- Stewart Daniel Hoban Sr.
- John Bunyon Holloway Jr.
- Granville Warner Hurley Sr.
- James Edward Hutchins
- Percy Costa Ifill
- Leon Quincy Jackson
- Willie Edward Jenkins
- Conrad Adolphus Johnson Jr.
- Harvey Nathaniel Johnson
- George Maceo Jones
- William Thomas Jones
- Horace King
- John Thomas King
- Arthur Edward Lankford
- John Anderson Lankford
- Calvin Esua Lightner
- Henry Lewis Livas
- Howard Hamilton Mackey Sr.
- Robert Prince Madison
- Calvin Lunsford McKissack
- Moses McKissack III
- John Alexander Melby
- John Merrick
- John Henry Michael
- Elon Howard Mickles
- Edward Charles Miller
- John Aycocks Moore
- William Henry Moses Jr.
- John Clavon Norman Jr.
- Kenneth Roderick O'Neal
- Joseph Lincoln Parker
- Frederick Blackburn Pelham
- Louis Hudison Persley
- William Sidney Pittman
- James Alonzo Plater
- Samuel Plato
- Henry James Price
- Edward Lyons Pryce
- Leon Andrew Price Jr.
- Wallace Augustus Rayfield
- Lawrence Reese
- Francis Jefferson Roberson
- Francis Rassieur Roberson
- Walter Lenox Roberts Jr.
- Hilyard Robert Robinson
- Robert L. Robinson
- William J. Robinson
- John Henry Rosemond
- Ferdinand Lucien Rousseve
- Charles Thaddeus Russell
- Roy Anthony Sealey
- William W. Smith
- Prince W. Spears
- William Alfred Streat
- John Dennis Sulton
- Vertner Woodson Tandy
- Robert Robinson Taylor
- Robert Rochon Taylor
- William Ferguson Thornton
- Ralph Augustin Vaughn
- Roscoe Ingersoll Vaughn
- Josiah Joshua Walker
- Booker Taliaferro Washington III
- Robert Edward Lee Washington
- John Austin Welch
- Clarence Buchanan Wheat Sr.
- Columbus Bob White
- Donald Frank White
- Richard Cassius White
- Miller Fulton Whittaker
- Clarence Wesley Wigington
- Paul Revere Williams
- David Augustus Williston
- John Lewis Wilson Jr.
- Howard Dilworth Woodson
- Edward Walter Owen Young
- Golden Joseph Zenon Jr.

== Bibliography ==
- Wilson, Dreck Spurlock (March 2004). African American Architects: A Biographical Dictionary, 1865-1945 (Revised ed.). New York City, NY: Routledge. ISBN 978-1-135-95629-5.
