= Helen Eugenia Parker =

American architect (b. 1909, d. 1940)

- Born: November 17, 1909; Pine Bluff, Arkansas, U.S.
- Died: unknown, after 1940
- Education: Howard University
- Occupations: Architect, drafter

Helen Eugenia Parker (1909–unknown), was an African-American architect, active in Detroit.

== Early life and career ==
Helen Eugenia Parker was born on November 17, 1909, in Pine Bluff, Arkansas, to parents Willie Parker and contractor Walter Eugene Parker. The family of seven later moved to Little Rock, Arkansas. When graduating in 1926 from Wiley High School-College (now known as Wiley College) in Marshall, Texas, she was a top student.

It is also likely she attended Howard University in Washington, D.C.

== Later career ==
Parker briefly returned to Little Rock. There, she taught mathematics in the segregated public high school, served as a librarian at the segregated library, and consulted for the Southern Tenant Farmers Union.

Around 1930s, Parker moved to Detroit, Michigan. There, she was an instructor for the Shop Drafting Training Program, part of the National Youth Administration of Works Progress Administration. As well as a drafter for the first two registered architects of color in Detroit, Alfonso R. Feliciano (1883–1940) a Puerto Rican graduate of Universidad de Barcelona, and Donald Frank White. She was associate architect for Trinity Hospital in Detroit, a black hospital which closed in 1962.

Parker was a board member of the Peter Pan Nursery. She was also active in professional associations, including Alpha Kappa Alpha sorority, the National Technical Association, and the Detroit Youth Assembly.

== Death and legacy ==
Parker died after 1940. Parker's profile was included in the book, African American Architects: A Biographical Dictionary, 1865–1945 (2004).

== See also ==
- African-American architects

=== Related architects ===
- Elizabeth Carter Brooks
- Georgia Louise Harris Brown
- Mary Ramsay Brown Channel
- Martha Ann Cassell Thompson
- Ethel Madison Bailey Furman
- Beverly Lorraine Greene
