= African-American architects =

African-American architects are those in the architectural profession who are African American in the United States. Their work in the more distant past was often overlooked or outright erased from the historical records due to the racist social dynamics at play in the country (and also due to the proxied nature of the profession itself), but the black members of the profession—and their historic contributions—have become somewhat more recognized since.

"The experience of being Black in architecture involves learning about a discipline that does not include the contributions of African American architects like Paul Revere Williams, Robert R. Taylor, Walter T. Bailey and Wallace Rayfield within the canons of the profession... The experience of being Black in architecture requires you to unearth the accomplishments of other Blacks in architecture to understand how they navigated the often tumultuous waters of the profession."

— Kwesi Daniels, 2020, department head at the Robert R. Taylor School of Architecture and Construction Science at Tuskegee University

== History ==
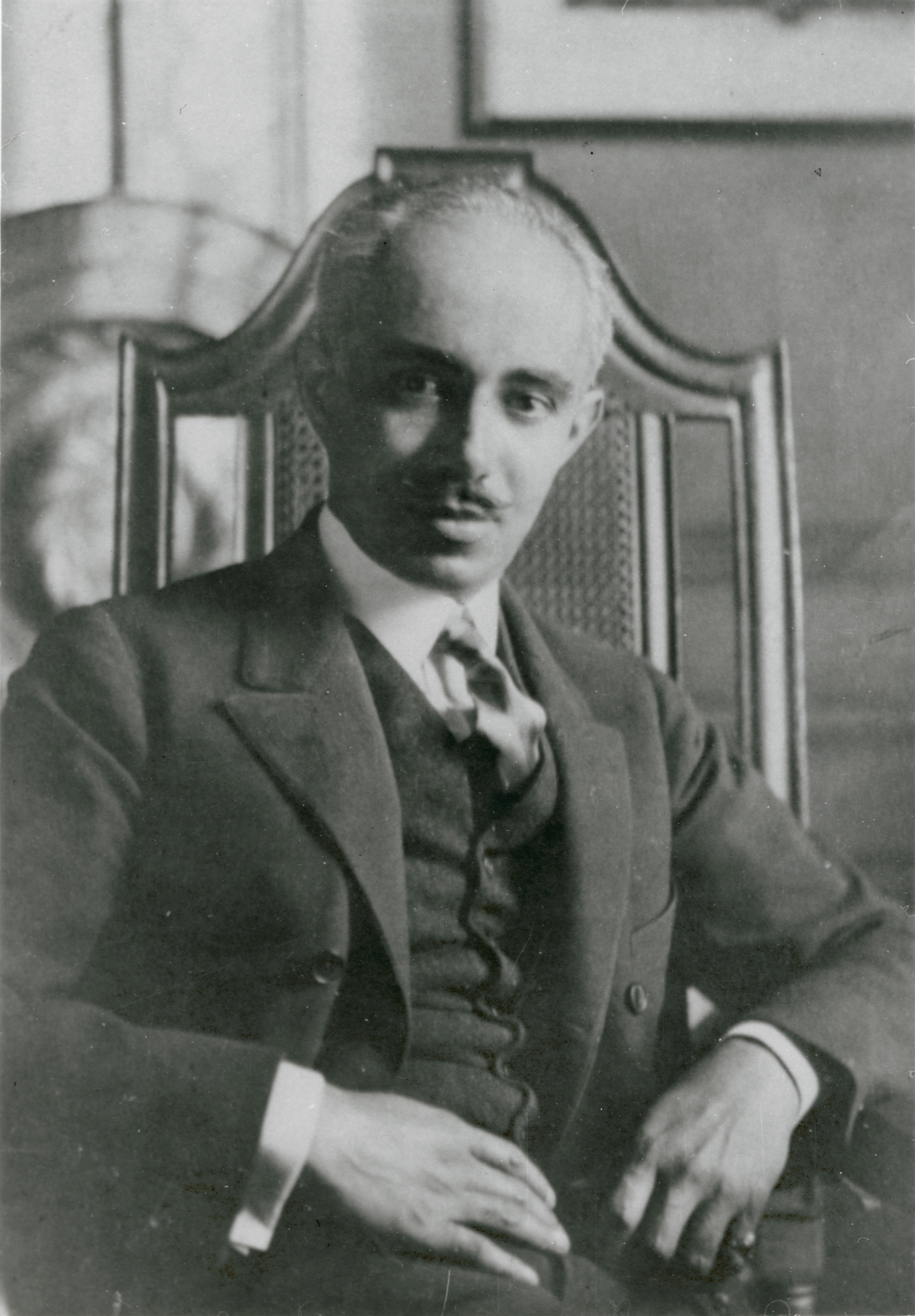
Julian Abele

=== 19th and 20th-centuries ===
The first African American architects appeared in the mid-1800s. Being African American and trying to become an architect in a White-dominated profession, especially in the 1800s-1900s was difficult. Racism towards African Americans was prevalent in the 1800s-1900s and this was amplified by the addition and enforcement of Jim Crow laws. Jim Crow Laws enforced segregation of White and Blacks, therefore promoting direct racism. Many African American architects working during and after this time period faced obstacles due to overt racism perpetuated by the society and culture of the United States.

==== Schools ====
Claflin University (formerly Claflin College) was the first historically Black school to offer an architectural drawing course, starting around the 1890s. Other early Black schools for architecture programs included Hampton University (formerly Hampton Institute), Florida A&M University, Howard University, North Carolina A&T State University, Prairie View A&M University (formerly Prairie View A&M College), Southern University, and Tuskegee University (formerly Tuskegee Normal and Industrial Institute).

==== Men ====
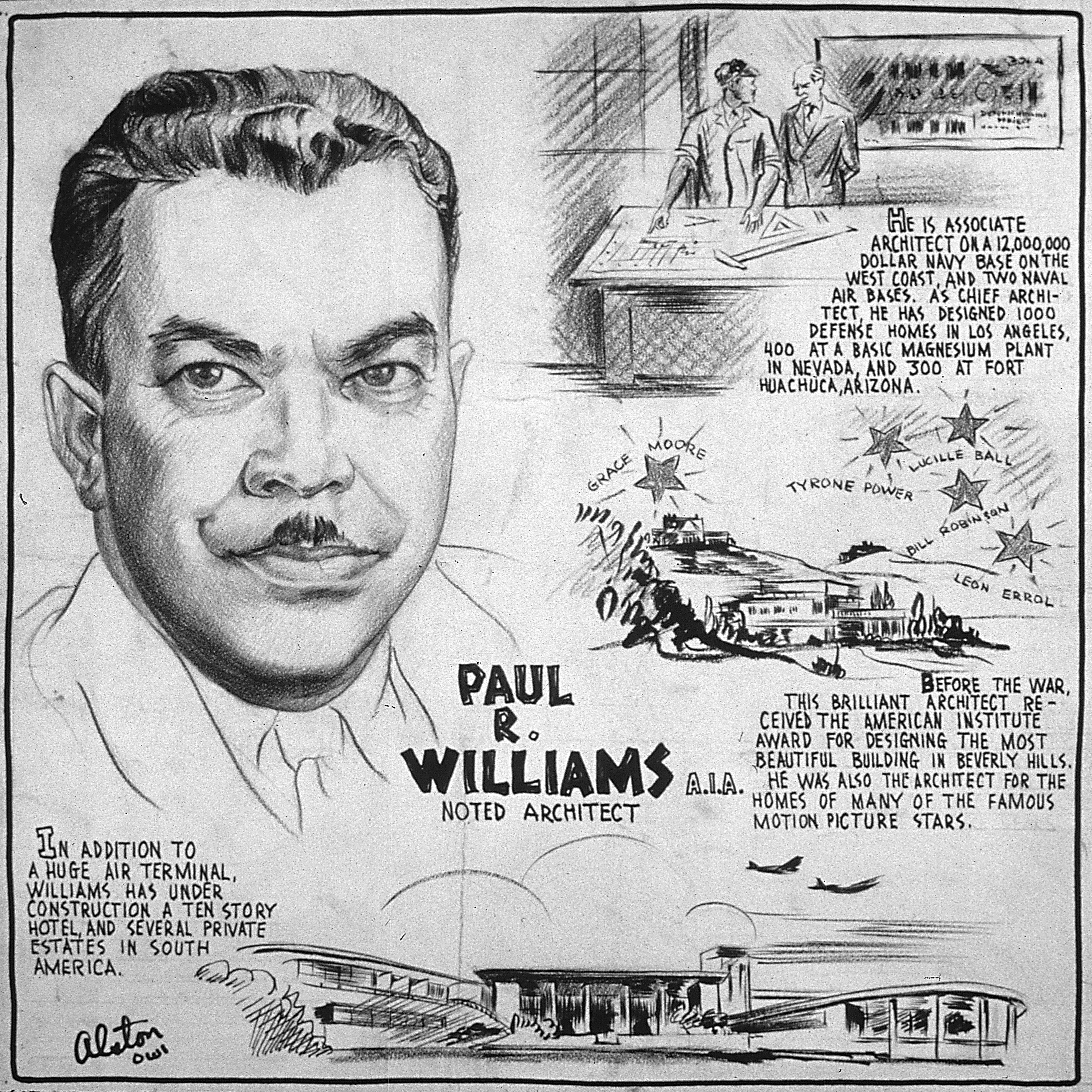
Paul Revere Williams (1943)

Some architects such as Julian Francis Abele, Louis Arnett Stuart Bellinger, and Paul Revere Williams were able to obtain architectural degrees from top universities, architectural licenses, and positions at top architectural firms. However, clients were often opposed to having their projects overseen by an African American architect. This resulted in many African American architects working without credit.

===== Julian Francis Abele =====
Julian Francis Abele (1881–1950), was the first African American to graduate from the University of Pennsylvania School of Architecture (1902). After traveling and studying in Europe under the sponsorship of Horace Trumbauer, Abele returned to Philadelphia and joined Trumbauer's firm in 1906. He served as chief designer from 1909 to 1938. The Philadelphia Museum of Art was a collaboration between Trumbauer's firm and that of Zantzinger, Borie and Medary. While another Trumbauer architect, Howell Lewis Shay, is credited with the building's plan and massing, the presentation drawings are in Abele's hand. It was not until after Trumbauer's death that Abele signed his architectural drawings, or claimed credit for being the main designer of Duke University's west campus. Abele also helped design the Widener Memorial Library at Harvard.

===== Paul Revere Williams =====
Paul Revere Williams (1894–1980), was raised in the Los Angeles area where he attended school. After Graduating from high school, Williams attended the Los Angeles School of Art and eventually studied at University of Southern California (USC) (class of 1919). Williams then worked for established firms run by Wilbert D. Cook Jr. and George D. Hall. Williams received his architecture license from the state of California, and was the first black person in the American Institute of Architects (AIA), joining the Southern California Chapter in 1923, and the first black person to become a fellow of the AIA, in 1957. In 1921, he became the first African American Architect west of the Mississippi. Williams was also a member of the Los Angeles Planning Commission in 1920, the California Housing Commission in 1947, the National Monument Commission in 1929, and the National Housing Commission in 1953. Williams designed residential buildings as well as churches, schools, and other commercial buildings.

==== Women ====
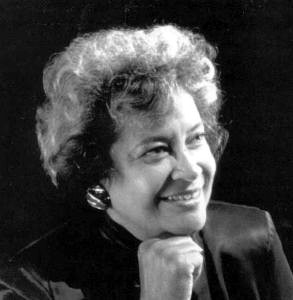
Norma Merrick Sklarek

Both African American men and women dealt with similar issues regarding race, but African American women in the mid-1800 to 1900s dealt with discrimination based on sex as well. The first African American women architects, such as Norma Merrick Sklarek and Beverly Loraine Greene, were faced with many challenges as they completed their journey of becoming architects. For years prior, the architecture industry was dominated by white men. In the 1900s, it was difficult for an African American man to receive a fair chance to become employed at a firm because of racism. On top of this, women were fighting for equal rights. Women architects not only had to overcome many setbacks due to their race but also due to their gender. Some common setbacks faced by Sklarek included being denied entry into the world of architecture, and not receiving recognition for their work. African American women had to work extremely hard just to have the chance to be educated in the field. As Sklarek demonstrated throughout her career, it was possible for African American women to excel in the architectural world, but the numbers of women within the field were low, and seem to have remained low from the time Sklarek was actively working to more recent years.

===== Norma Merrick Sklarek =====
Norma Merrick Sklarek (1928–2012), was the first black woman to become a licensed architect in both New York state (1954) and in California (1962). She graduated from Columbia University and worked for the architecture firms SOM and Gruen and Associates. She also was the first black woman to join the American Institute of Architects. Sklarek collaborated with Cesar Pelli on projects that include the Pacific Design Center and the U.S. Embassy in Tokyo.

===== Beverly Loraine Greene =====
Beverly Lorraine Greene (1915–1957), was the first black woman to become a licensed architect in the US. She was based out of Illinois, and started her practice in Chicago. She struggled to be noticed because of her race. Greene went on to work on international projects such as UNESCO headquarters in Paris, and designed buildings for NYU.

=== 21st-century ===
Although the culture and society in the United States have improved from the 19th and 20th centuries, African American architects and other people of color who desire to become an architect continue to deal with a lack of diversity in the field. Only 2% of licensed architects in the United States are Black or African American, and fewer than 1 in 5 new architects identify as a racial or ethnic minority, according to the National Council of Architectural Registration Boards.

The Directory of African American Architects maintains an ongoing list of licensed African American architects. In 2007, there were 100,000 licensed architects in the United States, however only 1,571 of them were African American and 186 of these are African American women. On October 24, 2019, there were 2,300 African American architects listed, including 467 women. African American architects represent about 2% of all licensed architects (116,000) and African American women represent approximately 0.4%, according to the National Council of Architectural Registration Boards (NCARB). There are several organizations and initiatives focused on increasing representation including the National Organization of Minority Architects, Riding the Vortex, 400 FORWARD, Hip Hop Architecture, First 500, and Beyond the Built Environment.

== List of African-American architects ==
=== Women ===
- Elizabeth Carter Brooks (1867–1951), architect as well as an educator and social activist; she was one of the first to recognize the importance of preserving historical buildings in the United States.
- Georgia Louise Harris Brown (1918–1999), considered to be the second African American woman to become a licensed architect in the United States. She worked in Chicago and Brazil with Mies.
- Alma Fairfax Murray Carlisle (born 1927), Los Angeles-based preservationist in the mid-20th century.
- Alberta Jeannette Cassell, one of the first two African American women to graduate from Cornell University in 1948, along with Martha Cassell Thompson. She became a naval architect with the United States Naval Sea Systems Command between in the 1970s.
- Ivenue Love-Stanley, co-principal (with her husband William J. Stanley III) of the Atlanta-based firm, Stanley, Love-Stanley, PC.
- Cheryl L. McAfee (born c. 1958), CEO of McAfee^{3}, she led the design and construction of sports venues of the 1996 Olympics in Atlanta. She was the first women to receive an architecture license in the state of Kansas in 1990.
- Helen Eugenia Parker, designed Trinity Hospital in Detroit.
- Michaele Pride-Wells (born 1956), sole proprietor of RE: Architecture in California (1989–1996); she is a professor of architecture at the University of New Mexico.
- Hermine E. Ricketts (1956–2019; also known as Hermine Ricketts-Carroll), Jamaican-born and founder of HER Architects, Inc. in 1986, located in Coral Gables, Florida; in 2013, she led a zoning legal battle in Florida to grow produce in front yards.
- Pascale Sablan (born 1983), Fellow of the American Institute of Architects and associate principal at Adjaye Associates
- Martha Cassell Thompson, one of the first two African American women to graduate from Cornell University in 1948, along with Alberta Jeannette Cassell. She was the chief restoration architect for the National Cathedral.
- Roberta Washington, founder of Roberta Washington Architects, PC. located in New York City, a full architectural design and planning services

=== Men ===
- Walter T. Bailey (1882–1941), first African-American graduate of the University of Illinois at Urbana–Champaign, to receive a Bachelor of Science degree in Architectural Engineering in 1904 and an honorary master's degree from the same school in 1910. Bailey assisted in the planning of Champaign's Colonel Wolfe School before being appointed head of the mechanical industries department at Tuskegee Institute in Alabama, where he supervised planning design and construction of several campus buildings.
- Lester Oliver Bankhead (1912–1997), pioneering Black architect in Los Angeles, California, known for his modernist church designs.
- Joseph M. Bartholomew, Sr. (1888–1971), golf course designer in New Orleans.
- Robert Charles Bates (1869–1950), thought to be the first Black teacher of architecture at a HBCU; and the first African American author of an architecture textbook. He published a textbook based on his class lectures in 1892, it may be the first architecture book authored by an African American.
- Louis Arnett Stuart Bellinger (1891–1946), was responsible for the design of significant buildings in and near Pittsburgh.
- Henry Clifford Boles (1910–1979), Modernist architect and part of the Associated Architect and Engineer firm from 1957 to 1969 with civil engineer Paul Parks.
- Charles Sumner Bowman (c. 1873–?), early graduate from Tuskegee Institute (now Tuskegee University); served as the director of the industrial school at Western University a historically black college (HBCU) in Quindaro, Kansas.
- J. Max Bond Jr. (1935–2009), became a partner of Davis Brody Bond in 1990 when it joined forces with Bond Ryder and Associates. The firm was renamed Davis Brody Bond in 1996.
- Thomas Wilson Boyde Jr. (1905–1981), first African-American graduate of the Syracuse University School of Architecture and the first African-American architect in Rochester, New York
- Calvin Brent (1854–1899), generally thought to be the first African-American architect to practice in Washington, D.C.
- Albert Irvin Cassell (1895–1969), designed buildings for Howard University, Morgan State University, and Virginia Union University.
- Albert Grant Brown (1881–1924), attended West Virginia Colored Institute (now West Virginia State University) and Tuskegee Institute, and later taught architecture classes at West Virginia Colored Institute.
- John S. Chase (1925–2012), in 1952, became the first African American to enroll and graduate from the University of Texas at Austin School of Architecture and later became the first African American male licensed to practice Architecture in the state of Texas. In addition, he was also the first African American admitted to the Texas Society of Architects and the Houston Chapter of the American Institute of Architects (AIA). In 1970 John S. Chase became the first African American Architect to serve on the United States Commission of Fine Arts and in 1970, he co-founded the National Organization of Minority Architects (NOMA), (along with 12 other black architects).
- William Wilson Cooke (1871–1949), first African American to obtain an architect's license in the state of Indiana in 1929; also the first African American employee at the Office of the Supervising Architect for the U.S. Treasury.
- Henry Beard Delany (1858–1928), taught at St. Augustine College from 1885 to 1908 and designed several buildings there.
- James C. Dodd (1923–1999), first Black architect in Sacramento, California; a founding member of NOMA.
- DeWitt Sanford Dykes Sr. (1903–1991), Black architect and minister, known for his national Methodist church designs.
- Gaston Alonzo Edwards (1875–1943), first Black licensed architect in North Carolina; professor at Shaw University, and president of Kittrell College
- George Washington Foster (1866–1923), among the first African-American architects licensed by the State of New Jersey in 1908, and later New York (1916).
- Louis Edwin Fry Sr. (1903–2000), architect and professor; former chair of the department of architecture at Howard University. Fry was a registered architect in Alabama, Washington, D.C., Maryland, Missouri, and Pennsylvania. He was known for his college and university campus architectural designs.
- Harvey Bernard Gantt (born 1943), architect and Democratic politician, he focused on urban planning.
- James Homer Garrott (1897–1991), early African American architect in Southern California and the second African-American admitted to the American Institute of Architects (AIA) in Los Angeles in 1946.
- Francis E. Griffin (1910–1973), early African American architect in Detroit.
- William Augustus Hazel (1854–1929), architect, stained glass artist, educator, and academic administrator; he was the first dean of the Howard University School of Architecture in 1919, and was one of the first Black stained glass artists in the United States.
- Wesley Howard Henderson (born 1951), architect, educator, and historian; noted for his writing on Paul Revere Williams.
- Percy C. Ifill (1913–1973), early Black architect in New York City.
- Leon Quincy Jackson (1926/1927–1995), possibly the first black architect in Oklahoma, but he experienced discrimination when he tried to take the state licensing board exam. Jackson taught architectural engineering at Prairie View A&M University and later Tennessee State University.
- Jeh V. Johnson (1931–2021) co-founder of the National Organization of Minority Architects (NOMA); and taught architectural design at Vassar College in Poughkeepsie, New York.
- Nathan Johnson (1926–2021), Black modernist architect, primarily working on iconic church design in Detroit.
- John A. Lankford (1874–1946), first professionally licensed African American architect in Virginia in 1922, and in the District of Columbia in 1924, he designed many office buildings and churches.
- Howard Hamilton Mackey (1901–1987), architect, educator, academic administrator, and painter; he worked at Howard University in the architecture department for 50 years.
- Robert P. Madison (born 1923), founder of Robert P. Madison, International, is the first African American to graduate from Western Reserve University (now Case Western Reserve University). When Madison completed and passed requirements for his architectural licensing examination in June 1950, he is believed to have become Ohio's first licensed African American architect. Madison was one of only 14 architects invited to tour China in 1974 after Richard Nixon's 1972 visit to China ended 25 years of isolation between the U.S. and China.
- Charles F. McAfee (born 1932), founder of Charles F. McAfee Architects, Engineers, and Planners firm (now McAfee^{3}) which was headquartered in Wichita, Kansas; he designed modular building materials, built his own manufacturing facilities, and focused on affordable housing and job building.
- Moses McKissack III (1879–1952), early African-American architect, and co-founder of McKissack & McKissack firm in Nashville, Tennessee.
- William Henry Moses Jr. (1901–1991), founder of the architecture program at the Hampton Institute (now Hampton University).
- Louis H. Persley (c.1888–1932), first African American to register with the new Georgia State Board of Registered Architects on April 5, 1920.
- William Sidney Pittman (1875–1958), established an early firm in Washington, D.C.
- Marshall E. Purnell (born 1950), design principal of Devrouax+Purnell Architects and Planners PC, Washington, D.C., he has been involved in numerous AIA activities. He is a fellow of the National Organization of Minority Architects (NOMA), of which he was elected president.
- Wallace Rayfield (1874–1941), second formally educated practicing African-American architect in the USA.
- Hilyard Robinson (1899–1986), best known for the design of the Langston Terrace Dwellings, built in 1936. Robinson also designed the Army training base of the infamous Tuskegee Airmen.
- Donald P. Ryder, co-founder of Bond Ryder & Associates
- Howard Sims (1933–2016), founded the architecture firm SDG Associates in Detroit (formerly Howard Sims & Associates, and later Sim–Varner), and philanthropist.
- Vertner Woodson Tandy (1885–1949), first African-American architect licensed by New York.
- Robert Robinson Taylor (1868–1942), first African American admitted to the Massachusetts Institute of Technology School of Architecture, and the only African American among 19 first-year students in the architecture atelier of the first school of architecture in the United States. In 1892, he became the first African American to earn a Bachelor of Science in architecture from MIT.
- Donald F. White (1908–2002), first registered Black architect in the states of Alabama and Michigan.
- Clarence W. Wigington (1883–1967), first registered Black architect in the state of Minnesota, and the first Black municipal architect in the United States.
- John Louis Wilson Jr. (1898–1989), one of the first African American architects to be registered in New York State; he worked designing on public buildings in New York City.

== Architectural firms owned by African Americans ==
- Hamilton Anderson Associates (1994–present), Detroit, Michigan
- McKissack & McKissack (1905–present), New York City, New York
- SDG Associates (1964–present), Detroit, Michigan
- Tandy & Foster (1908–1914), New York City, New York
