= Arnett Girardeau =

American dentist and politician

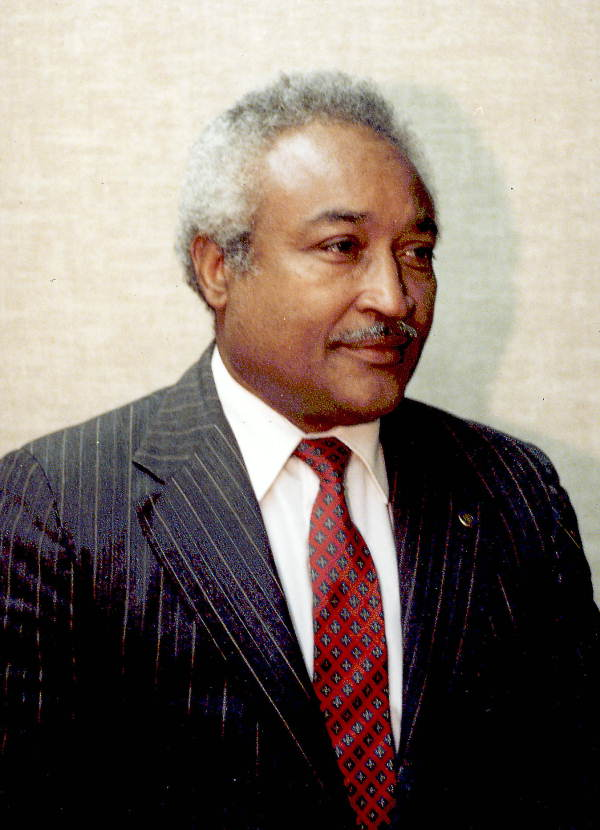
- Girardeau in 1988

Member of the Florida House of Representatives from the 16th distrist
- In office 1976–1982

Member of the Florida Senate from the 7th district
- In office 1983–1992

Personal details
- Born: Arnett Elysus Girardeau; July 15, 1929 Jacksonville, Florida, U.S.
- Died: October 26, 2017 (aged 88) Jacksonville, Florida, U.S.
- Party: Democratic
- Education: Howard University

Arnett Elysus Girardeau Sr. (July 15, 1929 – October 26, 2017) was an American dentist and politician in the state of Florida. He served in the Florida House of Representatives for the 16th district from 1976 to 1982 and in the Florida Senate for the 7th district from 1982 to 1992.

== Early life ==
Girardeau was born on July 15, 1929, in Jacksonville, Florida. His great-uncle was Richard L. Brown, a member of the Florida Legislature during Reconstruction. He graduated from Howard University, where he earned a bachelors of science degree in 1952 and a D.D.S. degree in 1962; he also attended graduate school at Wayne State University and Fisk University. He married Matilda Carolyn Lee and the couple had two children: Arnetta and Arnett Elysus Jr.

== Political career ==
The first African-American elected outside of Miami since Reconstruction, Girardueau served in the Florida House of Representatives from 1976 to 1983. In 1982, he was elected to the Florida Senate for the 7th district and he served until 1992. He was president pro tempore of the senate in the later years of his term.

== Death ==
Girardeau died on October 26, 2017, at the age of 88.
