= Francis E. Griffin =

American architect (1910–1973)

Francis Eugene Griffin
- Born: September 10, 1910; Battle Creek, Michigan, United States
- Died: February 14, 1973 (aged 62); Detroit, Michigan, United States
- Burial place: Oak Hill Cemetery, Battle Creek, Michigan, United States
- Other names: Frances E. Griffin
- Education: University of Michigan
- Occupation: Architect
- Years active: 1935–1973
- Spouse: Mallie Hill (b. 1936–?)
- Children: 2

Francis Eugene Griffin (1910–1973) was an American architect. He was a pioneering Black architect in Detroit and helped influence many other early career Black architects in the city. He was part of the architectural firms White & Griffin, and later Ward, Griffin, & Agee, and Francis E. Griffin Associates, Architects, & Planners. Griffin also worked in the 1950s for the United States government in designing structures in Liberia. His name is also spelled Frances E. Griffin.

== Early life and education ==
Francis Eugene Griffin was born September 10, 1910, in Battle Creek, Michigan, to African American parents Genevieve Tucker Griffin and William Edward Dunston Griffin. The family was part of the Mt. Zion A.M.E. Church in Battle Creek. He attended Battle Creek Central High School, and graduated in February 1928.

From 1928 until 1931, Griffin attended the University of Michigan (UMich); followed by a second period of study from 1933 to 1935. His exact graduation date from the bachelor of science degree in architectural engineering at UMich is unknown (either in 1935 or 1944).

In 1936, he married Mallie Hill; they had two children.

== Career ==
He worked in Washington, D.C., for John Anderson Lankford from 1936 until 1938; followed by work for Howard Hamilton Mackey Sr. from 1939 until 1941. In 1939, Griffin became a licensed architect in Washington, D.C.. Griffin had a private practice in his home at 5325 Ames, NE, in the Capitol View neighborhood of Washington, D.C., from 1941 until 1943. Followed by work as a cost estimator for Albert Irvin Cassell's Mayfair Mansions Apartments project (1943–1945).

He partnered with Donald Frank White between 1946 and 1968 to form the firm of White & Griffin Architecture–Engineering Associates in Detroit. In the mid-1950s, White & Griffin took a project in Liberia; a joint venture between the United States government, the Liberian government, and Prairie View A&M University to create the Booker T. Washington Institute, a vocational school patterned after the U.S. land grant college system.

In the late 1950s until the 1970s, he partnered with architects Harold Edward Ward and Aubrey Caston Agee to form the firm, Ward, Griffin, & Agee. By the 1970s, the firm name was changed to Francis E. Griffin Associates, Architects, & Planners.

He also worked for the City of Detroit Housing Commission from 1962 and 1969. Griffin was an active member of BAG (Black Architects Group) in Detroit; and a member of the American Institute of Architects (AIA). He was also a leader within the National Technical Association, providing training, opportunities, and support for African American architects.

== Death ==
He died of cancer on February 14, 1973, in Detroit. Griffin is profiled in the biographical dictionary African American Architects: A Biographical Dictionary, 1865–1945 (2004).

== List of works ==
- Aijalon Baptist Church (1950), 6419 Beechwood Street, Detroit, Michigan
- Considine Auditorium and Sculpture Court (1973), 8904 Woodward Avenue, Detroit, Michigan

== See also ==
- African-American architects
