= Donald F. White =

Canadian-born American architect (1908–2002)

Donald Frank White
- Born: May 28, 1908; Canada
- Died: April 23, 2002 (aged 93); Troy, New York, U.S.
- Education: University of Michigan
- Occupations: Architect, civil engineer, structural engineer
- Years active: 1932–1968; 1980–1995
- Spouse: Susie Taylor (m. 1936–1999; death)

Donald Frank White (1908 – 2002) was a Canadian-born American architect and engineer, of African descent. He was the first Black architect registered in the states of Alabama (in 1935) and Michigan (in 1939). He had been a partner of the firm of White & Griffin Architecture–Engineering Associates; and he later worked in the firms of Giffels & Vallet, and Nathan Johnson & Associates. He also worked in the 1950s for the United States government in designing structures in Liberia. White was the first Black graduate from the School of Architecture (now Taubman College of Architecture and Urban Planning) at University of Michigan, both in the undergraduate and graduate program. He was the first Black member of the Detroit chapter of the American Institute of Architects (AIA), and an early member of the national chapter.

== Early life and education ==
Donald Frank White was born on May 28, 1908, in Canada, and he was raised in Cicero, Illinois. His parents were Ada Perry and Ferry White, his father worked as a pattern maker for a gray iron foundry. His family moved when he was a teenager to Pontiac, Michigan. He attended Pontiac High School and graduated in 1927.

He married Susie Taylor around 1936, she was from Sparta, Georgia. They never had children. White graduated with a bachelor's degree in architecture (1932) from the University of Michigan in Ann Arbor, making him the first African American graduate from the department. In 1934, he received a master's of science degree in architecture from the University of Michigan's Rackham School of Graduate Studies.

== Career ==
From 1931 to 1933, White interned as a field assistant under Fredrick Earnest Giesecke. After graduating with a graduate degree in 1934, White joined the faculty at Tuskegee Institute (now Tuskegee University), working under the supervision of George L. Washington. The following year, in 1935, he became the first African American architect licensed in Alabama. While working at Tuskegee Institute, White worked with Louis Edwin Fry Sr. to design nearby campus buildings; including the Alabama State Teacher's College (now Alabama State University) in Montgomery, and the School for the Deaf in Mount Meigs.

In 1939, White left Tuskegee and moved to Detroit, where he opened a private practice in the Michigan Chronicle Building. He became the first licensed African American architect in Michigan in 1939. His office hired local Black architects, draftsman, and engineers, including Helen Eugenia Parker. In 1943–1944, he worked for Wayne County Better Homes, Inc., a Booker T. Washington trade association project, where White designed 10 floor plans.

In 1944, White joined the Detroit chapter of the American Institute of Architects (AIA); making him the first Black local chapter member, and either the second or third Black national member. In 1944, he became a registered civil and structural engineer in the state of Michigan. He partnered with Francis Eugene Griffin between 1946 and 1968 to form the firm of White & Griffin Architecture–Engineering Associates. He later worked in the firms of Giffels & Vallet, and Nathan Johnson & Associates, Inc., both in Detroit.

White served as president of the National Technical Association from 1949 until 1951, the organization was primarily made of African American engineers, scientists, and architects. He was also a member of the Economic Club of Detroit, the National Society of Professional Engineers, the NAACP, the Albany Inter-Racial Council, and the Booker T. Washington Business Association.

From 1953 until 1958, White was a deputy chief of an educational project in Harbel, Liberia. The project was a joint venture between the United States government, the Liberian government, and Prairie View A&M University to create the Booker T. Washington Institute, a vocational school patterned after the U.S. land grant college system.

From 1952 until 1955, White worked on the design for the Tappan Zee bridge. In 1958, he moved to Troy, New York to be closer to family. He worked as an architect for the New York State Department of Public Works in Albany, New York; after receiving his New York state license to practice architecture and engineering. He retired in 1968. However at the age of 72, in 1980, he came out of retirement to become a staff architect for the City of Albany Community Development Department (in Albany, New York). He returned to his retirement in 1995.

== Death and legacy ==
White died on April 23, 2002, in Troy; his service was held at the Fifth Avenue AME Zion Church in Troy, New York.

He had been a great influence on many early career Black architects in the 1940s and 1950s. The Donald F. White Fellowship was established in 2003 at the University of Michigan, for graduate students of architecture. White is profiled in the biographical dictionary African American Architects: A Biographical Dictionary, 1865–1945 (2004).

Many of White's buildings in the Detroit neighborhoods of Black Bottom and Paradise Valley were demolished in the 1950s and 1960s during the time of city "urban renewal" projects.

== Works ==
- 1931, Prairie View A&M College (now Prairie View A&M University) registrars office, Prairie View, Texas
- 1932, Prairie View A&M College dorms for unmarried men
- 1933, Prairie View A&M College duplex, Prairie View, Texas
- 1934, Tuskegee Institute (now Tuskegee University) Chambliss Hotel alterations, Tuskegee, Alabama
- 1934, Tuskegee Institute Cottage No. 34, Tuskegee, Alabama
- c. 1934, Tuskegee Institute Kay Barn, Tuskegee, Alabama
- c. 1934, Tuskegee Institute Russell Barn, Tuskegee, Alabama
- c. 1934, Tuskegee Institute Tompkins Dining Hall, Tuskegee, Alabama
- 1938, Sanitarium, Selma, Alabama
- 1938, Mt. Meigs School for the Deaf, Mount Meigs, Alabama; as associate architect
- 1940, St. Stephens African Methodist Episcopal Church addition, Detroit, Michigan
- 1944, Paradise Bowling Alley, Detroit, Michigan (destroyed in a fire in 1950)
- 1944, Friend Baptist Church Auditorium, Detroit, Michigan
- 1944, Milton Medical Clinic, Detroit, Michigan
- 1950, Aijalon Baptist Church, Detroit, Michigan
- 1954, Lincoln University Library, Jefferson City, Missouri; as associate architect
- c. 1960, Rightway Baptist Church, Detroit, Michigan

== See also ==
- African-American architects
