= Louis Edwin Fry Sr. =

American architect (1903–2000)

- Born: Louis Edwin Fry; January 10, 1903; Bastrop, Texas, U.S.
- Died: June 10, 2000 (aged 97); Washington, D.C., U.S.
- Education: Prairie View State College, Kansas State University, Harvard University
- Occupations: Architect, professor, department chair
- Years active: 1927–c. 1972
- Spouse: Obelia E. Swearingen (m. 1927–2000; death)
- Children: 2, including Gladys-Marie Fry
- Awards: AIA DC Centennial Award (1995)

Louis Edwin Fry Sr., FAIA, NOMA (1903–2000) was an American architect and professor. He was a former chair of the department of architecture at Howard University, a historically Black university in Washington, D.C.. Fry was a registered architect in Alabama, Washington, D.C., Maryland, Missouri, and Pennsylvania. He was known for his college and university campus architectural designs. Fry primarily worked at HBUs and state school designing buildings and campus plans, such as Prairie View A&M University; Howard University; Tuskegee University; Alabama State University in Montgomery, Alabama; and Lincoln University in Jefferson City, Missouri. Fry was a founding member of the National Organization of Minority Architects (NOMA). He was a partner in the architectural firm of Fry & Welch.

== Early life and education ==
Louis Edwin Fry Sr. was born on January 10, 1903, in Bastrop, Texas. His parents were Pleasant Ann and Henry Bowers Fry, he had one older brother. He attended Emile High School, a segregated Black high school and graduated from the 12th grade at the age of 15.

Fry attended Prairie View State College (now Prairie View A&M University), and graduated in 1922 with a B.S. degree in mechanical arts. He continued his studies at Kansas State University in Manhattan, Kansas, where he received B.S. degree (1927) in architectural engineering, and M.S. architecture (1929); and later returned to classes at Harvard University's Graduate School of Design, where he received a M.Arch. degree (1945). While attending Kansas State University graduate school, Fry was a member of Phi Beta Kappa; and he received the Lorentz Schmidt Award for his draftsmanship and an award from the AIA.

In 1927, Fry married Obelia E. Swearingen from Kansas City. Together they had two children; Louis Jr., who became an architect, and Gladys-Marie, an academic of folklore.

== Career ==
After graduating from Kansas State University's undergraduate program in 1927, Fry worked at Prairie View State College in Prairie View, Texas teaching engineering and math. He designed a Prairie View State College new campus dormitory for women called Evans Hall (1927), and a fifty bed hospital (1929, demolished in 1980). He was the second African-American licensed to practice architecture in the state of Texas.

After completing his master's at Kansas State University, Fry was hired as a senior designer by architect Albert Irvin Cassell, replacing Hilyard Robert Robinson on Howard University projects. He completed the Howard University women's dormitory project, started by Robinson. Other buildings at Howard University he worked on included the Douglas Hall classroom building, the Founders Library, the Chemistry Building, a power plant, the university entrance gate, and the campus master plan. Fry left Cassell's office after receiving and offer to teach from Tuskegee Institute (now Tuskegee University) in 1935.

Fry was appointed as the first chair of the architecture department at Tuskegee Institute, a newly formed department. Architecture was not a new field to the school, it had been taught since 1893, but Tuskegee Institute had reorganized the department structure. Fry worked on planning for department accreditation, and completed a campus master plan. While at Tuskegee Institute, Fry also worked to design nine buildings at Alabama State College (now Alabama State University) in Montgomery, including a library building. Fry left Tuskegee after receiving an offer in 1940 as campus architect from Lincoln University in Jefferson City, Missouri.

At Lincoln University, he designed the Journalism Building and the Page Library. In 1983, the Page Library was added as a contributing building to the "Lincoln Univ. Hilltop Campus Historic District", listed in the National Registrar of Historic Places in Cole County, Missouri. Fry finished designing the campus master plan working alongside Charles Edgar Dickinson. He took a sabbatical and enrolled in Harvard University's Graduate School of Design in 1944, working under Walter Gropius. When he graduated in 1945, he was the first Black graduate from the master's degree program in architecture. He briefly worked under Marcel Breuer as a draftsman, before returning to Lincoln University.

From 1947 until 1972, Fry worked as faculty at Howard University in Washington, D.C., while maintaining his private architectural practice (which included designing for other school campuses). Howard Hamilton Mackey Sr. served as the department chair at Howard University during his hire. Fry worked in helping the department achieve accreditation. He maintained his private architectural practice as a sole proprietor until 1954, when Fry partnered with John Austin Welch to form Fry & Welch. Fry & Welch designed 16 campus buildings in 5 states, and roughly a third of the campus for Tuskegee Institute. The partnership lasted until 1969.

In 1960, his son Louis Jr. joined his firm and helped him design in Washington, D.C. Throughout his career he maintained teaching at the college level. In 1967, Fry was named a fellow by the American Institute of Architects (AIA). He was a member of the Washington, D.C. Board of Examiners and Registrar.

== Death and legacy ==
Fry died from viral pneumonia on June 10, 2000, at the Washington Hospital Center in Washington, D.C.. He was survived by his wife of 73 years and two children. His son Louis Jr. died of complications from cancer a few years later, in 2006.

Fry mentored hundreds of African American architecture students. Fry's profile was included in the biographical dictionary African American Architects: A Biographical Dictionary, 1865–1945 (2004). The Kansas State University, Morse Department of Special Collections contains an archive named Louis Fry (folder 21).

== Awards ==
- 1966, Distinguished Service Award, Kansas State University
- 1967, College of Fellows, American Institute of Architects (AIA)
- 1995, Centennial Award, American Institute of Architects D.C. Chapter

== Work ==
- Mt. Carmel Apartments Housing (1960), Washington, D.C.
- Dr. James C. Grey House (1962), Washington, D.C.
- Dr. Stephen Davis House (1962), Washington, D.C.
- United House of Prayer (1964), Washington, D.C.
- Montana Terrance Public Housing (1965), Washington, D.C.
- Phelps High School greenhouse (1965), 704 26th Street NE, Washington, D.C.
- Fort Lincoln Elementary School (1967), 3100 Ft. Lincoln Drive NW, Washington, D.C.; now known as Marshall Elementary School
- Takoma Elementary School (1968), 7010 Piney Branch Road NW, Washington, D.C.
- Marie Reed Elementary School, 2200 Champlain Street NW, Washington, D.C.

=== Campus-based design work ===
- Prairie View A&M University, Prairie View, Texas
  - Womens Dormitory (1928), Prairie View A&M University; now called Evans Hall
  - Hospital (1929), Prairie View A&M University; demolished
  - Gym (1929), Prairie View A&M University; demolished
- Tuskegee University, Tuskegee, Alabama
  - Infantile Paralysis Hospital (1940), Tuskegee University
  - Food Processing Plant (1954), Tuskegee University
  - Chapel (1960), Tuskegee University; as associate architect
  - Andrews Hospital alterations (1962), Tuskegee University
  - School of Nursing (1962), Tuskegee University
  - Womens Dormitory (1962), Tuskegee University
  - Moton Hall, Tuskegee University
  - Vocational Building, Tuskegee University
- Alabama State University, Montgomery, Alabama
  - Arena/Auditorium (1954), Alabama State College
  - Classroom Building (1954), Alabama State College
  - Library addition (1962), Alabama State College
  - Science Building (1962), Alabama State College
  - Swimming Pool Building (1962), Alabama State College
  - Dining Hall, Alabama State College
  - Mens Dormitory, Alabama State College
- Lincoln University, Jefferson City, Missouri
  - Irving Clifford Tull Mens Dormitory (or Tull Hall) (1951), Lincoln University
  - Page Library (1954), Lincoln University; NRHP-listed as part of the Lincoln Univ. Hilltop Campus Historic District
  - Journalism Building, Lincoln University
  - Womens Dormitory, Lincoln University
- Morgan State University, Baltimore, Maryland
  - Classroom Building, Morgan State University

== Bibliography ==
- Fry, Louis Edwin (1981). Louis Edwin Fry, Sr: His Life and His Architecture. L.E. Fry.

== See also ==
- African-American architects
