= Charles Sumner Bowman =

American architect (1873–?)

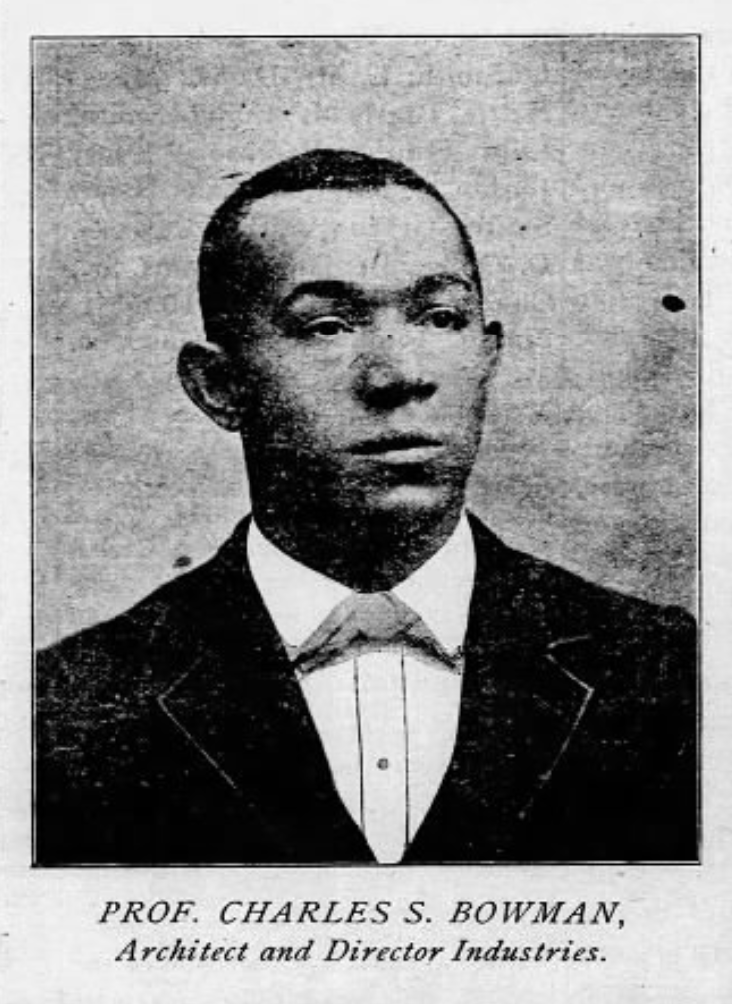
- Born: 1873; Mississippi, US
- Died: 1925 or later
- Other name: Charles S. Bowman
- Education: Tuskegee Institute
- Occupations: Architect, professor
- Spouse: Etta B. Buford

Charles Sumner Bowman (c. 1873–unknown), was an American architect and educator. He was director of the industrial department of Western University in Quindaro, Kansas from 1898 until 1902. Subsequently he had an architecture practice in Kansas City, Kansas up to 1925.

== Biography ==
Charles Sumner Bowman was born in c. 1873 in Mississippi. He and his three siblings were raised by his single mother Mattie (or Marta) Bowman, who was widowed, and worked as a maid in Vicksburg.

He attended night school at Tuskegee Institute (now Tuskegee University) starting in 1892. By 1895, Bowman had enrolled in the day school at Tuskegee Institute, where he earned a normal school diploma and carpentry diploma in 1898.

After graduation he became a director of the newly created industrial department known as Quindaro Industrial School at the Western University a historically black college (HBCU) in Quindaro, Kansas. He taught courses in carpentry, woodworking, machinery, architectural drawing, mechanical drawing, and cabinetmaking. Bowman worked for Western University from 1898 until 1902, followed by opening his own architecture firm in Kansas City.

Bowman was married to Etta B. Buford for less than one year, she had been a student at Western University.

Many of the biographical details of Bowman's life are unknown, including his circumstances in death, which was sometime during or after 1925. Bowman's profile was included in the biographical dictionary African American Architects: A Biographical Dictionary, 1865–1945 (2004).

== Works ==
- Stanley Industrial Hall (1900), Western University, Quindaro, Kansas (now demolished)
- Dr. Isham H. Anthony apartment building (1904), 1512 North 5th Street, Kansas City, Kansas (now demolished)

== See also ==
- African-American architects
