= Robert Charles Bates =

American architect (1869–1950)

- Born: January 27, 1869; Kingsville, Richland County, South Carolina, U.S.
- Died: May 2, 1950 (aged 81); Spencer, Tioga County, New York, U.S.
- Other names: R. Charles Bates, Robert C. Bates
- Education: Claflin University (MA)
- Occupations: Architect, educator
- Known for: Design of early campus buildings at Claflin University, possibly the first Black teacher of architecture at a HBU, possibly the first African-American architecture textbook author
- Spouse: Maybelle Dean
- Children: 5

Robert Charles Bates (January 27, 1869 – May 2, 1950), commonly known as R. Charles Bates, was an American architect, educator, and textbook author. He was an African-American architect and helped design and build many of the Claflin University campus buildings, a historically black university (HBU) in South Carolina. He is thought to the first Black teacher of architecture at a HBU; and the first African-American author of an architecture textbook.

== Early life and family ==
Robert Charles Bates was born on January 27, 1869, in Kingsville (or Kingville), a rural community outside of the city of Columbia in Richland County, South Carolina. Many of the details of his life have conflicting records. Some records show his birth as c. 1872, in Columbia, South Carolina.

It is thought that he took a correspondence course in mechanical drawing (possibly from Scranton Correspondence School in Scranton, Pennsylvania). Bates studied architecture and engineering under Thomas William Silloway of Boston, from 1885 to 1893. He attended Claflin University's Normal School (which was connected to the University of South Carolina at the time) to become a teacher, and graduated with a MA degree in 1888.

Bates married Maybelle Dean from Elmira, New York, and together they had five children.

== Career ==
He was appointed in 1888 as a professor at Claflin University, and as the superintendent of manual training in carpentry, drafting, and architecture (which included various titles held), and his selection for the role had been determined by the Freedmen's Aid Society and the Southern Education Society. By fall of 1890, Bates was teaching architectural drawing at Claflin, and is believed to be the first Black teacher of architecture at a HBU. Two years later, he published a textbook based on his class lectures, it may be the first architecture book authored by an African American.

In 1895 until 1896, he travelled for one year and studied in technical schools across Europe.

Bates moved to Upstate New York in order to start the manual training department and teach mechanical drawing at Elmira Reformatory, from 1897 to 1900. Followed by teaching vocational trade at the Tome School for Boys (later Jacob Tome Institute) in Port Deposit, Maryland. He remained at Tome School until his retirement in 1940. Bates died on May 2, 1950, in a nursing home in Spencer, New York.

Bates' profile was included in the biographical dictionary African American Architects: A Biographical Dictionary, 1865–1945 (2004) by Dreck Spurlock Wilson. However, many of the biographical details of Bates's life in Wilson's book were unknown or uncertain at the time of publishing, including the circumstances of his death.

== Publications ==
- Bates, R. Charles (1892). The Elementary Principles of Architecture and Building. Boston, Massachusetts: Press of Geo. H. Ellis.

== Works ==
- T. Willard Lewis Chapel (1890) at Claflin University, Orangeburg, South Carolina
- Fisk Building (main building, 1899) the north and south towers at Claflin University, Orangeburg, South Carolina (destroyed by a fire in 1913)
- Fisk Building (main building, 1900) classroom annex at Claflin University, Orangeburg, South Carolina (destroyed by a fire in 1913)
- John F. Slater Manual training building at Claflin University, Orangeburg, South Carolina

== See also ==
- African-American architects
- Robert Robinson Taylor, another early Black teacher of architecture at a HBU
- William Wilson Cooke, African-American architect also at Claflin
