= Adam Clayton Powell Jr. State Office Building =

Office skyscraper in Manhattan, New York

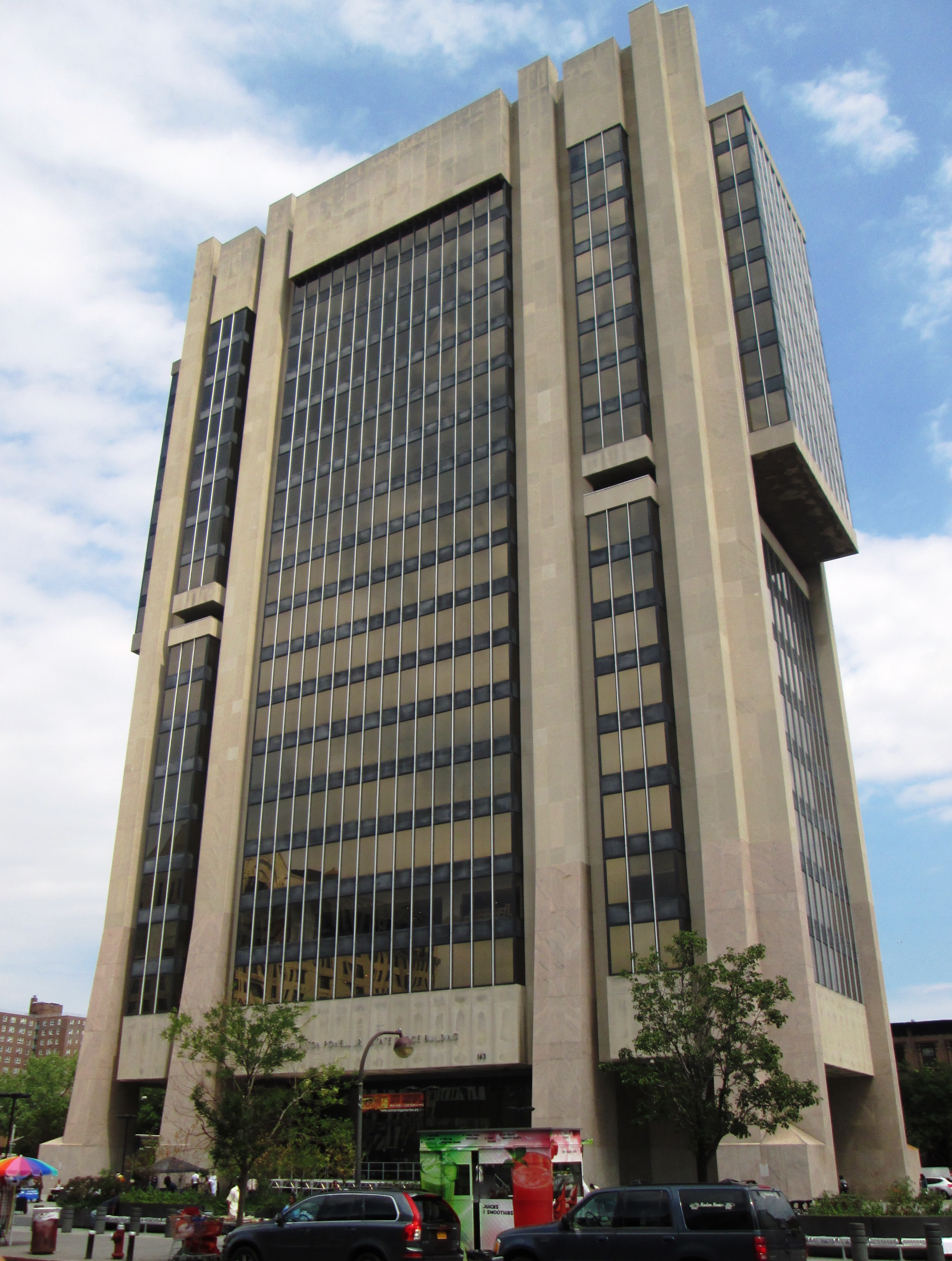
- (2013)

General information
- Status: Completed
- Type: Government Offices
- Architectural style: Brutalism
- Location: 163 West 125th Street, Manhattan, New York, U.S. 10027
- Coordinates: 40.80923°N 73.94746°W
- Construction started: 1967
- Completed: 1973
- Opening: 1974
- Renovated: 2014–2016
- Cost: $36 million (1974)
- Owner: State of New York
- Operator: Office of General Services

Technical details
- Floor count: 19
- Floor area: 260,000 square feet (24,000 m^{2})
- Lifts/elevators: 9

Design and construction
- Architect: Ifill Johnson Hanchard
- Main contractor: Trans Urban Construction Co. Inc, and Lasker-Goldman Corporation
- Awards: New York State Award for Excellence

The Adam Clayton Powell Jr. State Office Building, originally the Harlem State Office Building, is a nineteen-story, high-rise office building located at 163 West 125th Street at the corner of Adam Clayton Powell Jr. Boulevard in the Harlem neighborhood of Manhattan, New York City. It is named after Adam Clayton Powell Jr, the first African-American elected to Congress from New York. It was designed by the African-American architecture firm of Ifill Johnson Hanchard in the shape of an African mask in the Brutalist style. It is the tallest building in Harlem, overtaking the nearby Hotel Theresa.

== History ==
The building was proposed in 1966 by then-Governor of New York State, Nelson Rockefeller, as the beginning of development to turn Harlem into a "truly viable community". Ground was broken in 1967 with the demolition of a Corn Exchange Bank building. In 1969 work was halted on the project as a result of demonstrators objecting to the racial makeup of the construction workforce and the intended purpose of the facility. By mid-1970 the dispute was resolved and work resumed on the site.

The building was completed in 1973 and was initially known as the Harlem State Office Building. While the building was criticized for lacking basic requirements such as a building manager and fire equipment, in 1978 the location hosted Harlem's first giant Christmas tree.

In 1983 the building was renamed the "Adam Clayton Powell Jr. State Office Building" after the former U.S. Representative, the Rev. Adam Clayton Powell Jr., who had died in 1972. The building was threatened with closure in 1994 due to budget cuts, but it remained open.

Over the years, the building has been criticized as a "killer building" from the urban renewal movement of the 1960s that "disfigured" the neighborhood, and as an example of mediocre government architecture. However, others have embraced it as helping to focus the community's efforts in future development battles.

In 2006, the Harlem Community Development Corporation partnered with the New York State Office of General Services to propose a redesign of the African Square that the building occupies.

== In popular culture ==
- In several episodes of the FX American comedy-drama Rescue Me, the building is used multiple times as the fictional headquarters of the department.
- The building is seen under final stages of construction in the 1972 American blaxploitation film Across 110th Street. As Joe Logart, played by Ed Bernard, makes his run to the train station, he is cornered by Capo Nick D'Salvio's men in his taxi and forced to flee on foot. He was later caught and thrown from the roof of the building.
