= Henry Clifford Boles =

American architect (1910–1979)

- Born: February 22, 1910; Oxford, Lafayette County, Mississippi, U.S.
- Died: January 29, 1979 (aged 68); Hyannis Port, Barnstable County, Massachusetts, U.S.
- Other name: Hank Boles
- Education: LeMoyne Junior College, Crane Junior College; Illinois Institute of Technology, Harvard University
- Occupation: Architect
- Movement: Modernist
- Spouse: Myrtle C. Spralley (m. 1938–?)
- Children: 3

Henry Clifford Boles (1910–1979), also known as Hank Boles, was an American architect. He had his own architecture firm, as well as being a part of the Associated Architect and Engineer firm from 1957 to 1969 with civil engineer Paul Parks. Early in his career Boles worked on designing buildings in Monrovia, Liberia, through a United States Department of State program. In his later life he primarily designed in Massachusetts and worked on many civic and community projects in Boston, in the town of Dennis, and in the surrounding area.

== Early life and education ==
Henry Clifford Boles was born on February 22, 1910, in Oxford, Mississippi, to parents Willa Wright Boles and William Robert Boles, a shoe cobbler.

He graduated in 1927 from LeMoyne Junior College (now LeMoyne–Owen College) in Memphis, Tennessee; followed by a brief study at Crane Junior College in Chicago. Boles graduated with a B.Arch (1943) from Illinois Institute of Technology, where he studied under Ludwig Mies van der Rohe. He returned to school many years later and graduated with a M.Arch (1949) from Harvard University, where he studied under Walter Gropius.

== Career ==
From 1929 until 1943, while in school, Boles worked as a clerk for the United States Postal Service to support his family. After graduation he served for two years as an assistant plant engineer at the Aero Parts Manufacturing Company in Wichita, during the end of World War II. He worked under architect Hilyard Robert Robinson for 6 months in 1945.

He returned to school to get a his master's degree in 1949, which was followed by a few years employment for the federal government.

from February 1950 to November 1951, Boles worked at the United States Housing Authority and the United States Army Corps of Engineers in Boston. He moved to Monrovia, Liberia after, to work for the United States Department of State as the chief architect at the Point Four Program from late-1951 to 1954, a technical and economic assistance program for "developing countries" started in 1949. While in Monrovia he created housing for the U.S. technicians (1952–1954), an Agricultural Experiment Station (1953), and the Monrovia Elementary School (1954).

He moved back to Massachusetts in 1954, in order to found his own Boston-based architecture firm. In 1957, he joined civil engineer Paul Parks to form the partnership called Associated Architect and Engineer. Early commissioned projects were the Methuen Junior High School and Saint Stephan's Episcopal Church Parish Hall (1961) in the Roxbury neighborhood of Boston. William Spilman, an engineer, later joined the firm. In 1969, the firm dissolved and after in which Boles created the bulk of his design work.

Boles was the vice chairman of the town of Dennis' board of selectmen from 1973 until 1977. He also served as the chairmen of the Dennis board of health. He was a member of the American Institute of Architects (AIA) and the National Association for the Advancement of Colored People (NAACP).

== Death and legacy ==
Boles died on January 29, 1979, in Hyannis Port, Massachusetts. He was buried at Blue Hills Cemetery in Braintree.

The Northeastern University Library holds archives that feature photographs of Boles and Parks from the 1960s. Boles' profile was included in the biographical dictionary African American Architects: A Biographical Dictionary, 1865–1945 (2004).

== Personal life ==
Boles married Myrtle C. Spralley in 1938, together they had 3 children.

He served as the churchwarden of the Christ Church Episcopal Church in Harwich Port.

== Works ==
- Agricultural Experiment Station (1953), Monrovia, Liberia
- Monrovia Elementary School (1954), Monrovia, Liberia
- Boles residence (c. 1960), 97 Great Western Road, South Yarmouth, Massachusetts
- Knights of Columbus Home of Council (1961), 462 Broadway, Methuen, Massachusetts
- Marksdale Gardens (1965), 96 Humboldt Avenue, Roxbury, Boston, Massachusetts; created under Associated Architect and Engineer
- Methuen Fire Station (1967), Methuen, Massachusetts
- Saint David Episcopal Church (1970), South Yarmouth, Massachusetts
- Student Union-Ely Library (1973), Westfield State College, Westfield, Massachusetts
- Methuen Elderly Housing (1974), Methuen, Massachusetts
- Dennis Elderly Housing (1974), Center Street, South Dennis, Massachusetts
- U.S. Post Office (addition) (1975), Wakefield, Massachusetts
- North Street Fire Station (1976), Tewksbury, Massachusetts
- Brewster Baptist Church (1976), 1648 Brewster Street, Brewster, Massachusetts
- Brunswick Gardens (c. 1977), Brunswick Street, Dorchester, Boston, Massachusetts
- Massachusetts Bureau of Building and Construction office and garage, Plymouth, Massachusetts

== See also ==
- African-American architects
