= Hermine Ricketts =

Jamaican-born American architect (1956–2019)

Hermine E. Ricketts
- Born: 1956; Hermitage, Saint Andrew Parish, Jamaica
- Died: August 24, 2019 (aged 62–63); Florida, U.S.
- Other name: Hermine Ricketts–Carroll
- Education: Howard University
- Occupations: Architect, activist, painter
- Spouse: Tom Carroll

Hermine E. Ricketts, also known as Hermine Ricketts–Carroll (1956–2019), was a Jamaican-born American architect, activist, and painter. She was active as an architect in South Florida, where she was the only Black female architect in 1992. She and her husband made national news when they had a six-year-long legal battle with the Village Council of Miami Shores to keep a vegetable garden in their front yard. The Florida legislature eventually passed a law making front-yard gardens legal; Ricketts died soon after.

== Biography ==
Ricketts was born in 1956 in Hermitage, Saint Andrew Parish, Jamaica. She attended Howard University in Washington, D.C.

Ricketts was the founder president in 1986 of HER Architects, Inc., located in Coral Gables, Florida. Her architecture work was acknowledged in The New York Times, and Ebony magazine, where she was named a "top women architect" in the 1990s. In 1992, Ricketts was the only Black female architect in South Florida. Her work included the renovation of the Jackson Memorial Hospital, and a renovation of a Veterans Hospital. Within the Miami-Dade County Public Schools, she designed alongside the Broward firm the Miami Shores Elementary School and Comstock Elementary School; and designed alone the Carol City Elementary School and Jann Mann Opportunity Education. She also designed African Square Park in Meyga Learning Center at 1466 NW 62nd Street in Miami. In 2004, Ricketts paintings were included in a group exhibition "Three Women" at the gallery at the African Heritage Cultural Arts Center, 6161 NW 22nd Avenue, Miami.

She and her husband Tom Carroll had a six-year-long legal battle with the Village Council of Miami Shores in order to change zoning so she could keep her vegetable garden in their front yard. Starting in 2013, the village of Miami Shores banned growing vegetable gardens in front yards, which became punishable by a daily fine of US$50 because they were "unsightly and violated zoning codes". For 20 years, Ricketts had maintained a vegetable garden in her front yard. Her case was supported by the Institute for Justice. Not long after the Florida legislature passed a law making front yard gardening legal, Ricketts died on August 24, 2019, after a struggle with illness she believed was due to the stress of the legal fight.

== Work ==
- Veterans Hospital
- Jackson Memorial Hospital renovation, 1611 NW 12th Avenue, Miami, Florida
- Miami Shores Elementary School, with Broward firm, 10351 NE 5th Avenue, Miami Shores, Florida
- Comstock Elementary School, with Broward firm, 2420 NW 18th Avenue, Miami, Florida
- Carol City Elementary School, Miami Gardens, Florida
- Phyllis Ruth Miller Elementary School, 840 NE 87th Street, Miami, Florida
- Jann Mann Opportunity Education, 16101 NW 44th Court, Opa-locka, Florida
- African Square Park in Meyga Learning Center, 1466 NW 62nd Street, Miami, Florida

== See also ==
- African-American architects
