= Percy C. Ifill =

American architect (1913–1973)

Percy Costa Ifill
- Born: June 16, 1913; Harlem, New York City, New York, U.S.
- Died: May 18, 1973 (aged 59); New York City, New York, U.S.
- Education: Cornell University, New York University (BS)
- Occupation(s): Architect, architectural engineer, interior designer
- Years active: 1940–1972
- Spouse: Natsu Ikeda (m. c.1950–1973; his death)

Percy Costa Ifill (June 16, 1913 – May 18, 1973) was an American architect. He was a co-founder of a leading Black architectural firm in New York City, Ifill Johnson Architects (1962 to 1967), later known as Ifill Johnson Hanchard Architects (1967 to c.1973).

== Early life and education ==
Percy Costa Ifill was born on June 16, 1913, in Harlem, New York City. His mother was Louise Costa, from Saint Thomas, U.S. Virgin Islands; and his father was James Percy Ifill, a lawyer from Barbados, British West Indies. He graduated from DeWitt Clinton High School, where he discovered a love of art.

Ifill attended Cornell University for a year in 1934, before transferring to New York University (NYU) to take night classes while he worked as a draftsman at various architecture firms in the daytime. He graduated with a B.S. degree in architecture in 1939 from NYU. While in school in 1939, Ifill won the third place in the General Electric National Competition.

== Career ==
From 1935 to 1940 while attending NYU, Ifill worked as a draftsmen for the Works Progress Administration (WPA) for a project with the United States Army Corps of Engineers for the Department of Hospitals.

In 1941, he worked under architect Hilyard Robert Robinson in Washington, D.C., as an architectural engineer for the 99th Pursuit Squadron Airfield and Training Base at Cheaha, Alabama. In 1945, Ifill won third prize in the General Motors National Dealer Establishment Competition. Ifill also worked with Hilyard Robert Robinson in 1942 on the George Washington Carver dormitory at Howard University in Washington, D.C.. He was a designer and renderer in 1945 for Liberian Centennial Victory Exposition to be held in Monrovia.

Between 1946 until 1961, he worked under Eleanor LeMaire at Eleanor LeMaire Associates, Inc., a noted department store interior design firm in New York City where he worked as the first Black staff designer, and led the design of office spaces and department stores. Ifill became a licensed architect in New York state on June 30, 1950.

In 1962, Ifill partnered with Conrad Adolphus Johnson Jr. (1919–1991) to establish in Midtown Manhattan, Ifill Johnson Architects. In 1967, George Hanchard joined the firm, the name was changed to Ifill Johnson Hanchard Architects. Ifill Johnson Hanchard Architects designed churches, banks, apartment buildings, airports, and schools. The firms most notable project was the Adam Clayton Powell Jr. State Office Building (1974) on 163 West 125th Street; which was a 20-story building and when it was built it was the largest office building in New York designed by Black architects.

== Death ==
In 1972, Ifill was diagnosed with terminal cancer, and resigned from his role at the firm. He died at age 59 on May 18, 1973, at Saint Luke's Hospital in New York City. He was survived by his wife, who posthumously wrote the biography, Natsu Ifill: Remembrances of Percy C. Ifill, Architect (1992). He was also profiled in the book, African American Architects: A Biographical Dictionary, 1865–1945 (2004).

== List of notable buildings ==
- 99th Pursuit Squadron Airfield and Training Base (1941), Cheaha, Alabama; with Hilyard Robert Robinson
- George Washington Carver dormitory (1942), at Howard University, Washington, D.C.; with Hilyard Robert Robinson
- Liberian Centennial Victory Exposition (1945), Monrovia, Liberia; with Hilyard Robert Robinson

=== Ifill Johnson Architects ===
- Ojike Memorial Medical Center (1962), Lagos, Nigeria
- Village East Towers (1964), 170 Avenue A and 411 East 10th Street, New York City
- Mount Morris Park Swimming Pool and Bath House (1966), 124th Street at Fifth Street, New York City
- St. Martin's Tower (1966), 65 West 90th Street, New York City
- Phipps Center Police Athletic League (1967), 225 West 123rd Street, New York City

=== Ifill Johnson Hanchard Architects ===
- Varick Community Center (1970), 151 West 136 Street, New York City (closed)
- Western Union Message Center (1973), 1290 Powell Jr. Drive, New York City
- United Moravian Church (1973), 200 East 127th Street, New York City
- United States Port Office (1974), 434 East 14th Street, New York City
- Adam Clayton Powell Jr. State Office Building (1974), 163 West 125th Street, New York City

== See also ==
- African-American architects
