= Joseph Bartholomew (golf course designer) =

American architect and golf course designer

Joseph Manuel Bartholomew, Sr.
- Born: August 1, 1885; New Orleans, Louisiana, U.S.
- Died: October 12, 1971 (aged 86); New Orleans, Louisiana, U.S.
- Other names: Joseph M. Bartholomew, Joseph M. Bartholomew Sr., Joe M. Bartholomew
- Occupation: Architect
- Known for: Golf course architectural designs

Joseph M. Bartholomew, Sr. (August 1, 1885–October 12, 1971), was an American architect, philanthropist, and golf course designer.

== Early life ==
Bartholomew was born on August 1, 1885 New Orleans, Louisiana. However some sources have his year of birth as either 1881, or 1888. He attended school up until the 8th grade. As a child, he served as a caddie at the Audubon Golf Course; in adulthood he became a greenskeeper at the course.

== Career ==
Bartholomew was the first African American man to build a public golf course, even though he was often barred from playing on these fields due to racial segregation. His first construction project was for the Metairie Golf Club. After spending time in New York learning about golf course architecture, he began construction of the Louisiana course in 1922. For the next ten years, Bartholomew designed and built several courses across Louisiana, including City Park No. 1, City Park No. 2, and Pontchartrain Park in New Orleans. The Pontchartrain was renamed Joseph M. Bartholomew Sr. Golf Course, for Bartholomew in 1979.

Bartholomew also maintained his own construction company and expanded his business into landscaping.

He was the first African-American inducted to the Greater New Orleans Sports Hall of Fame. He was a major contributor to Dillard University and Xavier University of Louisiana. Bartholomew's profile was included in the biographical dictionary African American Architects: A Biographical Dictionary, 1865–1945 (2004).

== See also ==
- African-American architects
