= Charles Edgar Dickinson =

American landscape architect (1908–1964)

Charles Edgar Dickinson Jr.
- Born: August 12, 1908; Columbus, Ohio
- Died: November 17, 1964 (aged 56); Jefferson City, Missouri
- Education: Ohio State University (BA, MS, PhD)
- Occupation(s): Landscape architect, educator
- Spouse: Edith Waterman (or Edythe Watermann)

Charles Edgar Dickinson Jr. (August 12, 1908 – November 17, 1964) was an American landscape architect and educator. He was the first Black member of the American Society of Landscape Architects (ASLA).

== Early life and education ==
Charles Edgar Dickinson Jr. was born on August 12, 1908, in Columbus, Ohio. He attended public school in Columbus.

Dickinson attended Ohio State University, where he received a bachelor of landscape architecture degree (1930), a master's of science degree (1945), and a doctor of philosophy.

He was married to Edith Waterman (or Edythe Watermann), and they did not have children.

== Career ==
He worked as a landscape architect and professor at Palmer Memorial Institute in Sedalia, North Carolina. This was followed by work teaching at Tuskegee Institute (now Tuskegee University) from 1931 to 1932; and teaching at South Carolina State University from 1934 to 1940.

Dickinson's longest teaching and landscaping tenure was at Lincoln University in Jefferson City, Missouri, from December 1940 until November 1964. He collaborated with architect Louis Edwin Fry Sr. on the landscape architecture for the Page Library at Lincoln University.

He died of a heart attack on November 17, 1964, in Missouri. Dickinson's profile was included in the biographical dictionary African American Architects: A Biographical Dictionary, 1865–1945 (2004).
