= Thomas Wilson Boyde Jr. =

First black architect in Rochester, New York (1905–1981)

Thomas Wilson Boyde, Jr.
- Born: December 25, 1905; Washington, D.C., U.S.
- Died: September 12, 1981 (aged 75); U.S.
- Other names: Thomas W. Boyde, Jr.
- Education: Syracuse University
- Occupation: Architect
- Spouse: Jennie Jones
- Children: 3

Thomas Wilson Boyde, Jr. (1905–1981), was an American architect. He was the first African-American graduate of the School of Architecture of Syracuse University and the first African-American architect in Rochester, New York.

== Early life and education ==
Thomas Wilson Boyde, Jr. was born on December 25, 1905, in Washington, D.C. Boyde was the third of four children. Denied 1923 entry to West Point United States Military Academy, he attended four universities in five years. Boyde graduating 1928 with a Baccalaureate in architecture from the School of Architecture of Syracuse University.

The next five years he had four employers, including a New York State agency.

== Career ==
When the Rochester architect who designed what later was renamed Monroe Community Hospital hired Boyde as one of his assistants, the latter's decorative style of corner windows and curved walls had a chance to develop. This led to a series of other works and, later on, his own architectural firm. His project list included over 30 commercial locations and a larger number of private properties. The second largest category of his designs were restaurants.

His papers are part of the Rochester Museum and Science Center's collections. A 2020 local TV news article said "What exactly he's responsible for designing is still debated today." A $300,000 project "to fund a cultural resource survey of the architecture of Thomas W. Boyde Jr." was announced later that year.

Boyde's profile was included in the biographical dictionary African American Architects: A Biographical Dictionary, 1865–1945 (2004).

== Personal life ==
He married at age 24 in 1930. He and the former Jennie Jones had three children. In later life he had multiple sclerosis, and died at age 75.

== Works ==
- Monroe County Home and Infirmary (now Monroe Community Hospital) (1933), Rochester, New York; designed with Sigmund Firestone Assoc. architect
- Blue Label Food Plant (1936), 460 Buffalo Road, Rochester, New York; designed with Sigmund Firestone Assoc. architect
- Lawrence Collins residence (1939), 4425 Douglas Street NE, Washington, D.C.
- Carver House (1943), 192 Ormond Street, Rochester, New York
