= Howard Hamilton Mackey =

American architect, educator (1901–1987)

Howard Hamilton Mackey Sr.
- Born: November 25, 1901; Philadelphia, Pennsylvania, U.S.
- Died: August 20, 1987 (aged 85); Washington, D.C., U.S.
- Education: University of Pennsylvania
- Occupations: Architect, painter, printmaker, educator, academic administrator
- Years active: 1924–1973
- Known for: Tropical housing architecture
- Movement: Tropical Modernism
- Spouse: Matilda Eleanor Kendricks
- Children: 1
- Awards: Whitney Young Award (1983)

Howard Hamilton Mackey Sr., FAIA (1901–1987), was an American architect, painter, educator, and academic administrator. For 50 years he worked at Howard University, from 1924 until 1973; including serving as the department head, and associate dean.

== Early life and education ==
Howard Hamilton Mackey was born on November 25, 1901, in Philadelphia, Pennsylvania, to Black parents Anna Willis and Henry Bardon Mackey. His father was a butler for a White family and his mother was a domestic worker. From 1916 to 1920, Mackey attended South Philadelphia High School. The summer after high school graduation, he worked as a junior draftsman for architect William Augustus Hazel.

Mackey received a bachelor of architecture in 1924 from the University of Pennsylvania's School of Architecture. In 1936, he took a teaching sabbatical to work on a master's degree at the University of Pennsylvania.

== Career ==
He worked at Howard University for 50 years, from 1924 until 1973; as a faculty member (1924–); department head (1929–); and later an associate dean of the School of Architecture and Engineering (1937–). When Mackey joined Howard University in 1924, there were only two other full time instructors in the architecture department at the time, Hilyard Robert Robinson and Albert Irvin Cassell. Under Mackey's leadership, Howard University became the first HBCU to have an accredited architecture program.

From 1954 to 1957, Mackey took a sabbatical from Howard University in order to teach at the University of Maryland's Civil Engineering Department. During his time at the University of Maryland, he received a contract from the U.S. Department of State to develop housing plans in Suriname and British Guiana (now known as Guyana) for the Foreign Operations Administration. He also was a U.S. delegate to a Pan-American housing conference in Bogotá, Colombia. Because of these experiences abroad, Mackey became known for his tropical housing architectural designs.

He was a member of the College of Fellows of the AIA starting in 1962, and was awarded the Whitney Young Award in 1983. He was the second African-American to be elected to the College of Fellows of the AIA, after Paul R. Williams. Mackey was a chairman of the D.C. Board of Zoning Adjustments, a member of the D.C. Board of Architectural Examiners, and he served on the National Capital Planning Commission's committee on Landmarks of the Nation's Capital. Additionally, Mackey was a painter and exhibited his artwork at the Art Institute of Chicago, the Howard University Gallery of Art, and the Corcoran Gallery of Art.

In 1925, he married Matilda Eleanor Kendricks, and together they had one son. His son, Howard Jr. also worked as an architect. Mackey died on August 20, 1987, in the hospital in Washington, D.C., from pneumonia, a complication of Parkinson's disease.

Mackey's profile was included in the biographical dictionary African American Architects: A Biographical Dictionary, 1865–1945 (2004).

== See also ==
- African-American architects
