= Miller Fulton Whittaker =

American architect and college president (1892–1949)

President of South Carolina State College
- In office 1932–1949
- Preceded by: Robert Shaw Wilkinson
- Succeeded by: Benner C. Turner

Personal details
- Born: December 30, 1892 Sumter, South Carolina, U.S.
- Died: November 14, 1949 (aged 56) Orangeburg, South Carolina, U.S.
- Education: Kansas State College (B.S. Architecture, 1913; professional degree, 1928)
- Occupation: Architect, educator, college president
- Known for: Third president of South Carolina State College; architect of campus buildings including Hodge Hall

Miller Fulton Whittaker (December 30, 1892 – November 14, 1949) was an American architect, educator, and college president. He served as the third president of South Carolina State College (now South Carolina State University) from 1932 until his death in 1949. A trained architect and professor of physics, Whittaker guided the college through the Great Depression, oversaw significant campus expansion, and navigated the early tensions of the civil rights movement as the institution's leader.

== Early life and education ==
Whittaker was born on December 30, 1892, in Sumter, South Carolina, the son of Johnson Chesnut Whittaker and Page Harrison Whittaker. His father, Johnson Chesnut Whittaker, was one of the first three Black cadets to attend the United States Military Academy at West Point and was the subject of a widely publicized court-martial in the late 1880s before joining the faculty of the Colored Normal, Industrial, Agricultural, and Mechanical College of South Carolina (the predecessor to South Carolina State University).

Whittaker attended school in Sumter and at the academy of the Colored Normal, Industrial, Agricultural, and Mechanical College in Orangeburg, South Carolina, where his father had joined the faculty in 1900. In 1908, the family moved to Oklahoma City, where Whittaker graduated from Douglass High School in 1909. He earned a bachelor's degree in architecture from Kansas State College in 1913.

== Career ==
=== Faculty and architecture ===
In 1913, Whittaker joined the faculty of the Colored Normal, Industrial, Agricultural, and Mechanical College, teaching mechanical drawing and physics. During World War I, he served as a second lieutenant with the 371st and 368th infantry regiments of the all-Black 92nd Division.

In 1925, Whittaker became dean of the mechanical arts program at the college, but he devoted much of his time to architecture. He designed several campus buildings and supervised student labor in their construction. Among his most notable works was the design of Hodge Hall (now known as Lowman Hall), a facility for the college's science and agricultural programs, which was completed in 1917. In 1928, Kansas State College awarded Whittaker a professional degree in architecture after he submitted the drawings of Hodge Hall as his thesis. He also served as president of the State Association of College Presidents, Deans, and Registrars.

=== Presidency (1932–1949) ===
Whittaker was named the third president of South Carolina State College in 1932 following the death of Robert Shaw Wilkinson on March 13 of that year. He had previously served as acting president before being formally appointed president in May 1932.

==== Great Depression ====
Whittaker guided the college through the worst years of the Great Depression. Faculty salaries were slashed by one-third, and for a time there were doubts that the state could meet the college payroll. Enrollment declined to less than one thousand, and the high school program was terminated. With the assistance of New Deal programs (including the Works Progress Administration and the National Youth Administration), the financial support of the Rockefeller-sponsored General Education Board, and a 1937 state bond issue, Whittaker oversaw the construction of two academic buildings and a dormitory.

==== Academic development ====
Under Whittaker's leadership, the college achieved several significant milestones. In 1933, the college appeared on the approved list of the Southern Association of Colleges and Secondary Schools. He oversaw the establishment of a law school, the creation of a South Carolina State College Extension School with units in fifteen South Carolina communities, and the establishment of a Reserve Officers' Training Corps (ROTC) Infantry Unit. The first formal observance of Founders' Day was held in March 1938.

==== Post-war expansion ====
Following World War II, enrollments surged, with more than fourteen hundred students admitted, including five hundred veterans. Another five hundred applicants were rejected because of lack of space.

==== Civil rights era ====
With the onset of the civil rights movement, Whittaker found himself caught between state officials defending segregation and a Black community increasingly insistent on dismantling Jim Crowism. John Wrighten, an Army Air Force veteran and a graduate of South Carolina State, applied for admission to the University of South Carolina Law School and was rejected because of his race. State leaders prepared to establish a separate law school at South Carolina State, but with the assistance of Thurgood Marshall and the NAACP, Wrighten sued the university. Whittaker was called to testify in federal court in 1947. When Marshall asked Whittaker bluntly whether the proposed law school in Orangeburg would be equal to that of the University of South Carolina, Whittaker replied, "I don't think so." Whittaker had already complained, "They are putting me in the middle between the plaintiff and the defendants in this law school business." Wrighten lost the suit, and Whittaker supervised the creation of the new Black law school.

== Personal life and death ==
Whittaker never married. He continued his work as an architect throughout the 1930s and 1940s. He was a registered architect in South Carolina, Georgia, and North Carolina. His last project, designed in collaboration with John H. Blanche, was the Orangeburg Lutheran Church, which was completed in 1950.

In March 1949, Whittaker suffered a heart attack but returned to work by July. He died on November 13, 1949, at age 57, at his home in Orangeburg, South Carolina, following a second heart attack. He was buried in Palmetto Cemetery in Orangeburg. His funeral was held on November 15.

== Legacy ==
The Miller F. Whittaker Library at South Carolina State University, dedicated in 1969, was named in Whittaker's honor. The Whittaker family's legacy at the university spans multiple generations. Johnson Chesnut Whittaker, Miller's father, served as commandant of the campus military unit from 1901 to 1903. In April 2024, the university celebrated the 56th anniversary of the Miller F. Whittaker Library, with Whittaker's great-great-niece Elizabeth Whittaker-Walker delivering the featured address.
