= Paul Parks =

American civil engineer and civic leader (1923–2009)

Massachusetts Secretary of Education
- In office 1975–1979
- Governor: Michael Dukakis
- Preceded by: Joseph M. Cronin
- Succeeded by: Position abolished

Personal details
- Born: May 7, 1923 Indianapolis, Indiana, United States
- Died: August 1, 2009 (aged 86) Mattapan, Boston, Massachusetts, United States
- Spouse(s): Dorothy Alexander (m. 1947); Virginia Loftman (1972-2009)
- Children: 3
- Parent(s): Cleab (father); Hazel (mother)
- Education: Purdue University; Northeastern University
- Occupation: Civil engineer

Military service
- Allegiance: United States
- Branch/service: United States Army
- Years of service: 1943-1945
- Rank: Combat Engineer
- Unit: 365th Quartermaster Corps

Paul Parks (May 7, 1923 – August 1, 2009) was an American civil engineer. Parks became the first African American Secretary of Education for Massachusetts, and was appointed by Governor Michael Dukakis to serve from 1975 until 1979. Mayor Raymond Flynn appointed Parks to the Boston School Committee, where he was also the first African American.

Parks fought as a combat engineer for the U.S. Military and took part in the Normandy landings on Omaha Beach. Following his service in World War II, Parks was renowned for his work and dedication to desegregating Boston public schools through his role in the execution of the Boston Model City program, a program designed to use federal funding to develop selected areas in Boston and achieve economic stability. Parks was also a member of the Massachusetts State Advisory Committee to the U.S. Commission on Civil Rights, in which he was involved in the development of METCO, a program dedicated to resolving segregation in Boston public schools through desegregated busing and increased enrollment of black students in predominantly white schools.

== Early life and education ==
Parks's father, Cleab, was a disabled World War I veteran of Seminole descent. His mother, Hazel, was a social worker. Parks grew up in Indianapolis, which was characterized by its segregated education system at the time. He attended Crispus Attucks High School, an all-black institution in Indianapolis. Parks was awarded a $4,000 scholarship for winning an oratory contest in high school, and this monetary prize contributed to his college education when he enrolled at Purdue University in 1941. He was a member of the Omega Psi Phi fraternity. Before completing his Bachelor of Science in civil engineering, his education was interrupted in 1942 when he was drafted to fight in World War II as a combat engineer. Afforded by the benefits of the Serviceman's Readjustment Act, he resumed formal education at Purdue to complete his civil engineering degree, and he later earned a doctorate in engineering from Northeastern University after moving to Boston.

== Career ==
=== Military service ===
In 1942, Parks was drafted into the United States Army and was subsequently sent to Europe as a combat engineer in 1943 during World War II, where he served until 1945. Parks was a member of the 365th Engineer Regiment that sailed out of New York City on September 30, 1943, en route to Europe. As a combat engineer, his primary role was the detonation of mines. On June 6, 1944, the Allied Forces invaded the coast of Normandy on D-Day, and Parks was present on Omaha Beach during this invasion. Parks was also involved with the liberation of the Dachau concentration camp in 1945 after being detached from his original engineer unit. At Dachau, responsibilities included identifying and burying bodies. With the conclusion of his Western European military campaigns, Parks was eventually relocated to the Pacific South to assist in the liberation of the Philippines.

=== Civil engineer ===
Upon discharge from the military, Parks's initial work experience came in the form of planning and designing the new freeway system in Indiana as part of the Indiana Department of Transportation (1949–1951). He then moved to Boston to join Stone and Webster (1951), where he contributed to the design of dams and hydroelectric powerhouses as a hired engineer. At Fay, Spofford & Thorndike (1951–1952), Parks helped with the design of the New Jersey Garden State Parkway. Following these experiences, he worked on the design of missiles and contributed to nuclear engineering research at Chance Vought Aircraft (1952–1953) and Pratt and Whitney Aircraft (1953–1958), respectively. In 1957, Parks co-founded an architectural firm called Associated Architects and Engineer with fellow African-American Henry Clifford Boles. Notable commissions for the firm included the Methuen Junior High School, the Saint Stephen's Episcopal Church Parish Hall, and a major hospital in Philadelphia, among others. The firm was eventually dissolved in 1967.

Parks's engineering work also led him to numerous international opportunities. While still with his architectural firm, Parks traveled to regions of West Africa in 1967, including Liberia, Ivory Coast, Ghana, and Nigeria, to assist in housing projects. Furthermore, he was invited by the Israeli government in 1968 to serve as a consultant to its public systems involving education, housing, health, and justice.

Parks was a member of professional organizations including the American Society of Civil Engineers and the National Society of Professional Engineers.

=== Public service ===
Parks was well known for his involvement in desegregating public schools in Boston, Massachusetts. He was appointed as Massachusetts's Secretary of Educational Affairs, succeeding Joseph M. Cronin, who was the first to ever assume that role. Parks was appointed by Governor-elect, in 1974, Michael Dukakis. Parks was the first African American to be selected as a member of Dukakis's cabinet. As the Secretary of Educational Affairs, Parks was also the Executive Director of the Boston Model City Program, with the overarching goal of desegregating Boston schools and busing. Parks formed a council that would frequently report back to Governor Dukakis amidst a host of issues arising from the busing programs. Two decades following Parks's appointment as the Secretary of Educational Affairs, Parks then became the chairman of the Boston School Committee.

As the Chairman of the NAACP Education Committee, Parks was responsible for the Boston Model City Program. Parks was able to identify the growing economic issues found within the selected areas the program was in effect, noting that the unemployment rate was four times that of metropolitan Boston. Parks attributed these economic downfalls to the funding cuts to the program and advocated for it to remain in effect amidst several discussions of its termination. A statistical analysis conducted by Parks and his colleagues estimated that continued cuts to funding and termination of the program would cause more than $51 million in economic damage and a loss of 5,000 jobs. The program used federal funding of approximately $20 million to provide aid to 60,000 individuals in Dorchester, Jamaica Plain, and Roxbury, the latter of which was subject to a march in 1963 to protest segregation in Boston schools prior to Parks's appointment as Chairman.

Parks, in 1964, as a member of the Massachusetts State Advisory Committee to the U.S. Commission on Civil Rights, met with other members of the committee to revise evidence suggesting segregation in Boston public schools at that time. Parks and colleagues found that reading scores in black schools were far less than that of all-white public schools. Furthermore, they found that school administrators preached separate but equal quality of education for black and white students, despite evidence insisting on the opposite. The Kiernan Commission, spearheaded by Dr. Owen Kiernan in 1964, gathered exceptional individuals working in the field of education and business to assess the status and quality of education in Boston public schools. They returned with evidence to back Parks and the committee's claims of unequal quality of education and found that at least 32 schools were subject to this. Despite the condemning evidence presented to the Boston School Committee, they rejected the proof and dismissed the report. In 1965, Parks and the Massachusetts State Advisory Committee to the U.S. Commission on Civil Rights founded Operation Exodus, a program that buses black students to white schools outside of traditionally black neighborhoods in Boston. Additionally, Parks worked on establishing the Metropolitan Council for Educational Opportunity (METCO), a program that further supported racial desegregation in Boston schools by diversifying the student body and urged black students to enroll in predominantly white schools.

== Personal life ==
Parks was of African American, Muscogee, and Seminole ancestry. Parks married Dorothy Alexander on February 2, 1947, with whom he had three children: Paul Jr., Pamela, and Stacy. In 1972, Parks married Virginia Loftman. Parks died of cancer in 2009.
