= Alberta Jeannette Cassell =

American architect (1926–2007)

- Born: Alberta Jeannette Charolette Cassell; November 22, 1926; Washington, D.C.
- Died: October 24, 2007 (aged 80)
- Other name: Alberta Jeannette Cassell Butler
- Education: Cornell University
- Spouse: Francis Butler
- Children: 2
- Parent: Albert Cassell

Alberta Jeannette Cassell (November 22, 1926 – October 24, 2007), was an African American architect who worked for the United States Navy, and a children's book author. She was also known by the name Alberta Jeannette Cassell Butler.

== Early life and education ==
Alberta Jeannette Charolette Cassell was born in the District of Columbia, the daughter of architect Albert Cassell and teacher Martha Ann Mason. She attended James Monroe Elementary School, Bannecker Junior High, and Dunbar High School, graduating in 1944. Her father was determined that all of his children would become architects like himself, and that they would also attend his alma mater, Cornell University.

Cassell honored her father's wishes and went to Cornell University. In 1948, she became one of the first two African American women to graduate from their school of architecture (the other was her sister Martha Cassell Thompson). In 1947, she was part of an award-winning Cornell architecture team, in a national competition sponsored by the American Institute of Architects.

== Career ==
For two years, Cassell worked in her father's architecture firm, but left when he became involved in real estate development. In May 1951, she began working as an architectural engineer for the Naval Research Laboratory, until May 1961, when she started working as an engineering draftswoman with the Military Sea Life Command. Afterwards, she became a naval architect with the United States Naval Sea Systems Command between 1971 and 1982. She was a member of the Association of Women Architects (founded by Henrietta May Steinmesch), the Alpha Alpha Kappa chapter.

== Personal life ==
In 1950 Casell married Francis Butler, a mechanical engineer trained at Howard University; they had two children, Karl (born 1951) and Mira (born 1953). She retired due to a disability in 1982, and in her retirement, she began to write children's stories and devoting her time to photography. She was widowed in 2004, and she died in 2007, aged 80 years. Her children's book, The Little White Butterflies, was published posthumously, in 2012.

== See also ==
- African-American architects
