= William Henry Moses Jr. =

American architect, columnist, educator (1901–1991)

- Born: August 20, 1901; Cumberland County, Virginia, U.S.
- Died: October 19, 1991
- Burial place: Hampton University Cemetery, Hampton, Virginia, U.S.
- Education: Pennsylvania State University, New York University, Columbia University
- Occupation(s): Architect, columnist, educator, academic administrator
- Spouse: Julia Ann Mason (m. 1935–1991; death)
- Children: 2
- Relatives: Bob Moses (nephew)

William Henry Moses Jr. (1901–1991), was an American architect, educator, and academic administrator. He was the founder of the architecture program at the Hampton Institute (now Hampton University) in Hampton, Virginia.

== Early life and education ==
William Moses Jr. was born on August 20, 1901, in Cumberland County, Virginia, U.S.. He was born to parents Julia Trent Moses, and William Moses Sr., a Baptist minister. He was raised alongside his five siblings, and the family moved often because of his dad's work. He attended Central High School in Philadelphia, class of 1922.

He attended Pennsylvania State University (Penn. State) for two years, before withdrawing due to a lack of money. He later graduated from Penn. State in 1933 (B.Arch degree), and did postgraduate work at New York University and Columbia University.

In 1935, he married Julia Ann Mason from Virginia, she had been working as a teacher. Together they had two children.

== Career ==
After leaving college in 1924, Moses worked as a field superintendent under architect Vertner Woodson Tandy in New York City. This was followed by work as a draftsman under Louis E. Jallade, and as a freelance draftsman. In 1931, Moses returned to Penn. State to complete his bachelors degree in 1933. After graduation he went to work as a draftsman for the Columbia University Housing Studies.

In 1934, Moses joined the faculty at Hampton Institute, teaching architectural drafting. He was the first formally educated African American architect at Hampton Institute, and worked to form a new department in 1940. Moses initiated the architecture curriculum at the school and managed it through full accreditation by the National Architectural Accrediting Board in 1969. He retired from Hampton University in 1971.

== Death and legacy ==
He died on October 19, 1991, at the age of 90. Moses is buried at the Hampton University Cemetery, part of the Hampton University campus.

The architectural library at Hampton University shares his name, the William H. Moses Jr. Architecture Library and is dedicated in his honor.

== Works ==
- American Negro Exposition (1940), Chicago, Illinois; he participated on behalf of Hampton University
- Whittaker Memorial Hospital (1943), Newport News, Virginia; with Charles Thaddeus Russell
- Dixie Hospital (now Sentara Careplex Hospital), Hampton, Virginia

== See also ==
- African-American architects
