= Albert Grant Brown =

American architect (1881–1924)

- Born: 1881; Campbells Creek, West Virginia, U.S.
- Died: August 28, 1924 (aged 42–43); Charleston, West Virginia, U.S.
- Burial place: Spring Hill Cemetery, Charleston, West Virginia, U.S.
- Education: West Virginia Colored Institute, Tuskegee Institute

Albert Grant Brown (1881–1924) was an American architect and professor. He was an early African American architect and taught architecture at West Virginia Colored Institute (now West Virginia State University).

== Biography ==
Albert Grant Brown was born in 1881 in Campbells Creek, West Virginia. Brown attended Black Hawk Hollow Negro School for primary school. He continued his studies at West Virginia Colored Institute (now known as West Virginia State University) in Farm, West Virginia (now known as Institute, West Virginia); and Tuskegee Institute (now Tuskegee University) in Tuskegee, Alabama on a scholarship.

After graduation, Brown taught architecture classes at West Virginia Collegiate Institute (now West Virginia State University), his alma mater. He also served as the athletic director for many years.

After suffering from a hernia and checking into a hospital, he died on August 28, 1924, of pneumonia. Rev. Mordecai Wyatt Johnson preceded over his funeral service which was held at the First Baptist Church in Charleston, West Virginia. He was buried at Spring Hill Cemetery in Charleston, West Virginia.

== Work ==
- The Knights of Pythias Hall (1905), Washington and Dickinson Streets, Charleston, West Virginia; now demolished
- St. Paul Baptist Church (1920), 821 B Street, St. Albans, West Virginia

== See also ==
- African-American architects
