= Alma Carlisle =

American architect

Alma Fairfax Carlisle
- Born: Alma Fairfax Murray; July 9, 1927 (age 99); Alexandria, Virginia
- Education: Howard University
- Occupation: Architect
- Spouse: David Kay Carlisle
- Children: 3
- Practice: Los Angeles Bureau of Engineering

Alma Fairfax Carlisle (née Murray, born July 9, 1927), is an American architect and architectural historian who worked in Los Angeles. Her work led to the preservation of many historic districts and sites in the city of Los Angeles.

== Biography ==
Carlisle was born on July 9, 1927, in Alexandria, Virginia, where she was also raised. In high school, she began to become interested in architecture and architectural history, and family members, including her father, who were involved in real estate nurtured her interests. In 1950, Carlisle graduated cum laude from Howard University with an architecture degree.

Carlisle married David Kay Carlisle on July 28, 1953, and they had three children together. During the 1950s and 1960s, Carlisle was a homemaker. In 1975, she and her family moved to Los Angeles where Carlisle began working for the City of Los Angeles.

While Carlisle was an architectural associate for the Los Angeles Bureau of Engineering she helped investigate and provide evidence for preserving historic structures in Los Angeles. Her historic resources surveys, conducted in 27 neighborhoods in the city led to the "designation of four Historic Preservation Overlay Zones and more than 50 Historic-Cultural Monuments. Of the surveys, the ones in which she was most significantly involved with were Melrose Hill (1984) and Whitley Heights (1990). In 1996, she retired from the city, but in 2001, she joined an architectural firm in Los Angeles, Myra L. Frank & Associates.

== See also ==
- African-American architects
