= Georgia Louise Harris Brown =

African American architect

- Born: Georgia Louise Harris; June 12, 1918; Topeka, Kansas, US
- Died: September 21, 1999 (aged 81)
- Education: University of Kansas
- Occupation: Architect

Georgia Louise Harris Brown (June 12, 1918 – September 21, 1999), is considered to be the second African American woman to become a licensed architect in the United States. She was also the first black woman to earn a degree in architecture from the University of Kansas. She was also the only black member of the Chicago chapter of Alpha Alpha Gamma (female architects and allied women professionals).

== Early life and education ==
Brown was born on June 12, 1918, in Topeka, Kansas, to Carl Collins and Georgia Watkins, and was a middle child of five children. Her father was a shipping clerk and her mother was a school teacher who also studied classical music. Brown showed an artistic and mechanical aptitude at an early age: she worked on cars and farm equipment with her older brother and was interested in painting. She went to Seaman High School and went to Washburn University between 1936 and 1937. In 1938, she moved to Chicago and enrolled in classes at the Armour Institute of Technology, later known as the Illinois Institute of Technology and studied under Mies van der Rohe. From 1940, she attended the University of Kansas and received her architecture degree in 1944, the first black woman do so from the university. In 1941, she married James A. Brown; they divorced in 1952.

== Career ==
Brown started working in Chicago for Kenneth Roderick O'Neal from 1945 to 1949. She became a licensed architect on July 19, 1949, and began to work as an architect and engineer for Frank J. Kornacker & Associates that same year by which time she had two children. She was responsible for structural calculations on the apartments on 860 Lake Shore Drive in Chicago. While at Kornacker's 8-person firm, she attended evening civil engineering classes and moonlighted. She worked in Chicago until 1953, when she left for Brazil. One of her reasons for leaving the United States was because "opportunities for advancement were limited by her race" and that in Brazil, there would be fewer racial boundaries to her success.

Brown learned to speak Portuguese by studying with a friend, and permanently moved to São Paulo by 1954. For part of 1954, she worked for Charles Bosworth, but later opened her own interior design firm, Escandia Ltda.

In Brazil, Brown worked on several significant buildings and projects. She was the project manager and designer for a large complex in Osasco and later another owned by Pfizer Pharmaceutical Corporation in Guarulhos. She also designed a Jeep plant in San Bernardo and a shipping facility for Siemens. She also designed an airport for Krupp. Other highlights included the 376,740 square foot Kodak Brasileire Comerico film factory in São Jose dos Campos. She also designed over a dozen personal homes from 1971–1985 for wealthy Brazilians.

In 1995, Brown moved to Washington, D.C., where she retired and spent her remaining years as a volunteer youth mentor at St. Luke's Episcopal Church. After cancer surgery in 1999, she went into an unexpected coma which lasted two weeks until her death.

== See also ==
- African-American architects
