= Richard Lewis Brown =

African American architect

Richard Lewis Brown Sr. (1854–1948) was a builder and state politician who lived in Jacksonville, Florida. An African American, Brown was born in South Carolina and moved with his family to Florida after the American Civil War, first to Lake City and then Jacksonville. He was married in 1875 and worked as a carpenter, farmer, and minister. He served two terms in the Florida House of Representatives from 1881 to 1884. He worked construction for the Duval County school board and has a school named after him. He was the contractor for Centennial Hall at Edward Waters College. R.L. Brown was also a member of the Omega Psi Phi fraternity and a charter member for the Jacksonville chapter.

== See also ==
- African American officeholders from the end of the Civil War until before 1900
