= Martha Cassell Thompson =

African American architect

- Born: Martha Ann Cassell; 1925
- Died: 1968 (aged 42–43)
- Known for: Architecture
- Spouse: Victor Thompson (m. 1948)
- Children: 1

Martha Ann Cassell Thompson (1925–1968), was an American architect. She was a member of the prominent Cassell Family of African-American architects; and was the chief restoration architect for the Washington National Cathedral.

== Early life and education ==
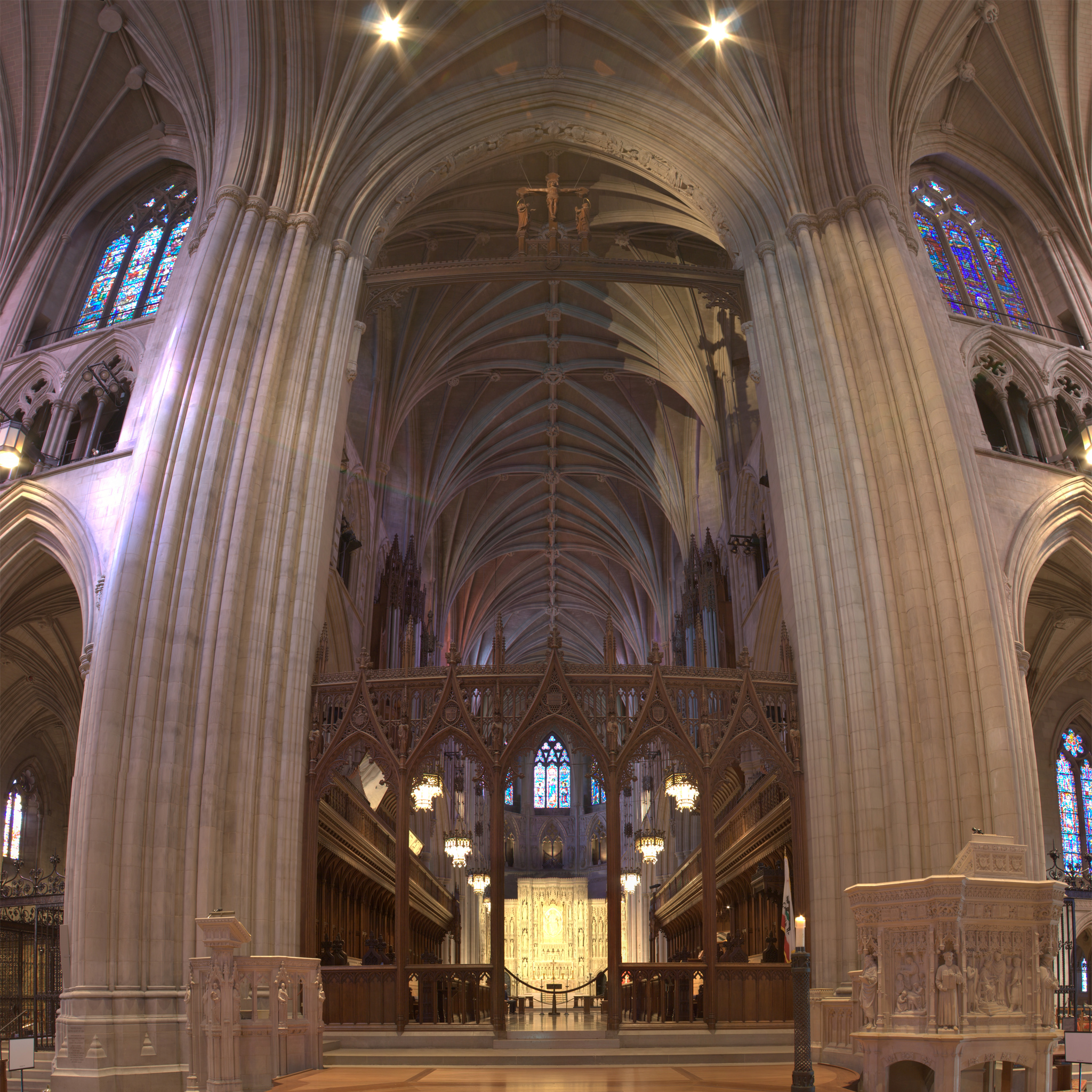
National Cathedral Center

Martha Ann Cassell Thompson was the second child of Albert Cassell, an architect, and Ann Mason Cassell, a Baltimore public school teacher. She attended James Monroe Elementary School, Garnett Patterson and Banneker Junior School, and Dunbar High School, graduating as class valedictorian in 1943.

Along with her siblings Charles Cassell and Alberta Jeannette Cassell, Martha was encouraged by their father Albert Cassell to attend Cornell University College of Architecture, Art, and Planning for graduate work. She attained a Bachelor of Science in architecture from Cornell University's School of Architecture in 1947 or 1948. She and her sister Alberta Jeannette Cassell were the first two African American women to graduate with a bachelor of architecture from the university.

== Career ==
Thompson, from 1949 to 1951, worked for an architectural firm in St. Louis. After which, she worked with architect Philip Hurbert Frohman (1887-1972) at the firm Frohman, Robb, & Little in the District of Columbia. There, given her expertise on Gothic architecture, she became the chief restoration architect for the Cathedral of St. Peter and Paul (originally designed by Bodley & Vaughn), later known as the Washington National Cathedral. She was also one of the only women architects on the team responsible for the completion of the project. She worked on the project from 1959 to 1968.

Martha Cassell Thompson was also a skilled pianist, and organized the Social Services Committee for the YWCA.

== Personal life ==
In 1948 Martha Cassell married Dr. Victor Thompson, who was a medical student at Meharry Medical College. They had one child, Karen Thompson, in 1949, who trained at Illinois Institute of Technology and became the third generation of architects. Martha Cassell Thompson died in 1968, and is buried at the Lincoln Memorial Cemetery, Suitland, Maryland.

== See also ==
- African-American architects
