= Robert P. Madison =

American architect

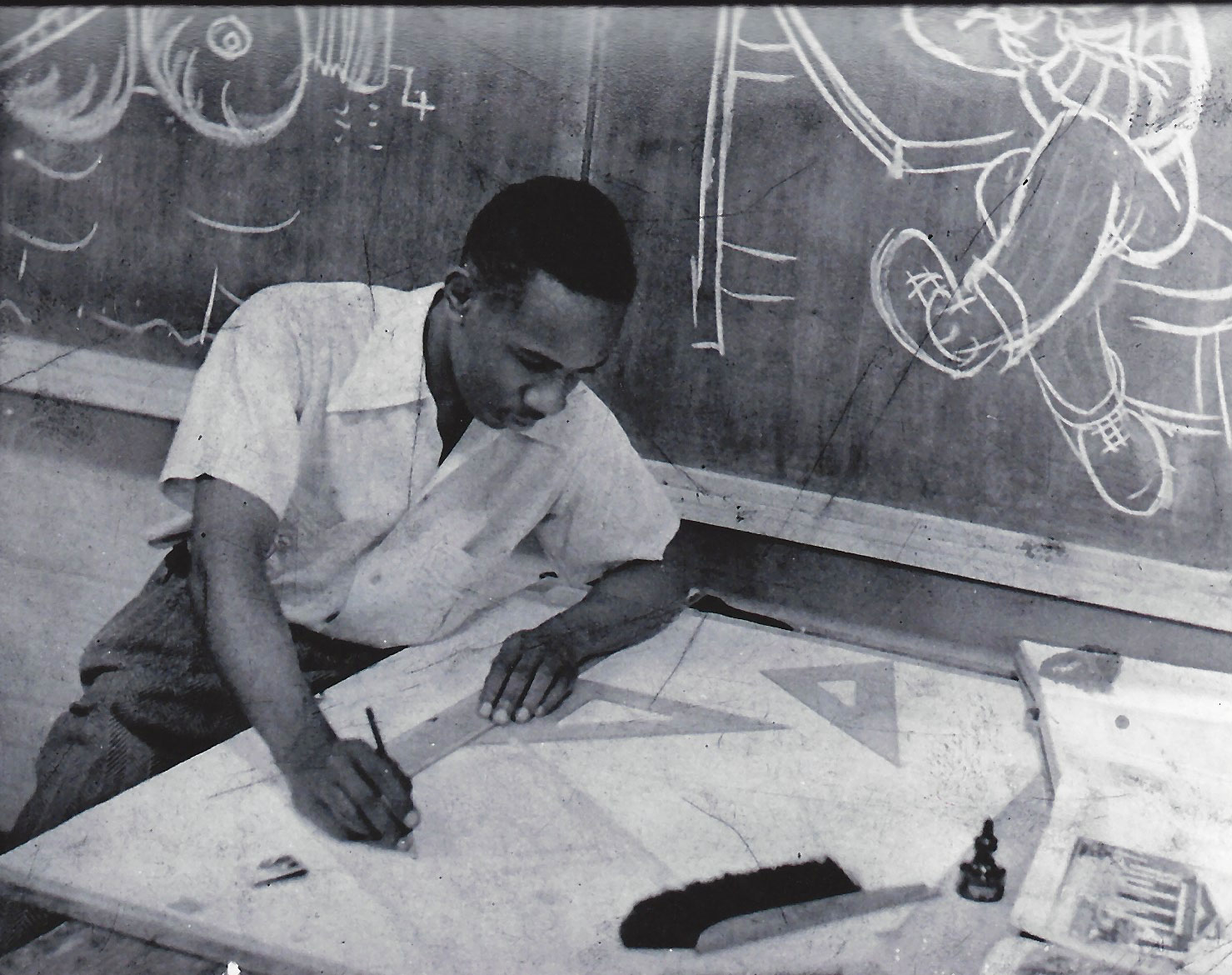
- Madison in 1940
- Born: July 28, 1923 (age 101); Cleveland, Ohio, U.S.
- Other names: Bob Madison
- Education: Case Western Reserve University; Harvard Graduate School of Design
- Occupation: Architect
- Website: www.rpmadison.com

Robert Prince Madison (born July 28, 1923) is an American architect.

== Early life and education ==
Madison was born in Cleveland, Ohio in 1923 to Robert James Madison (1899–1951) and Nettie Brown Madison (1900–1974). His father trained as an engineer but was unable to find employment in that profession. He had three younger brothers, two of whom, Julian and Bernard, also joined the family architecture firm.

He attended East Technical High School in Cleveland, graduating with honors in mathematics and science. In 1940, he entered the School of Architecture at Howard University, but interrupted his studies to serve as a second lieutenant in the U.S. Army during World War II. He was a member of the U.S. Army's African-American 92nd Infantry Division and served in Italy, receiving three combat ribbons and the Purple Heart. In 1946, he resumed his architecture studies at Case Western University, despite experiencing racial discrimination from the dean of architecture, graduating with a bachelor's degree in architecture in 1948. He was the first African-American to graduate from Case Western's School of Architecture, as well as the first to gain a degree in architecture in Ohio. He entered Harvard University's Graduate School of Design in 1951, studying under Walter Gropius, and received his master's degree in architecture in 1952.

Madison briefly taught architectural design and site planning at Howard University as an assistant professor, before being awarded a Fulbright Scholarship to study abroad. He was the first African-American architect to be selected for this scholarship. He studied urban design at the École des Beaux-Arts, Paris, in 1952–53.

== Architectural career ==
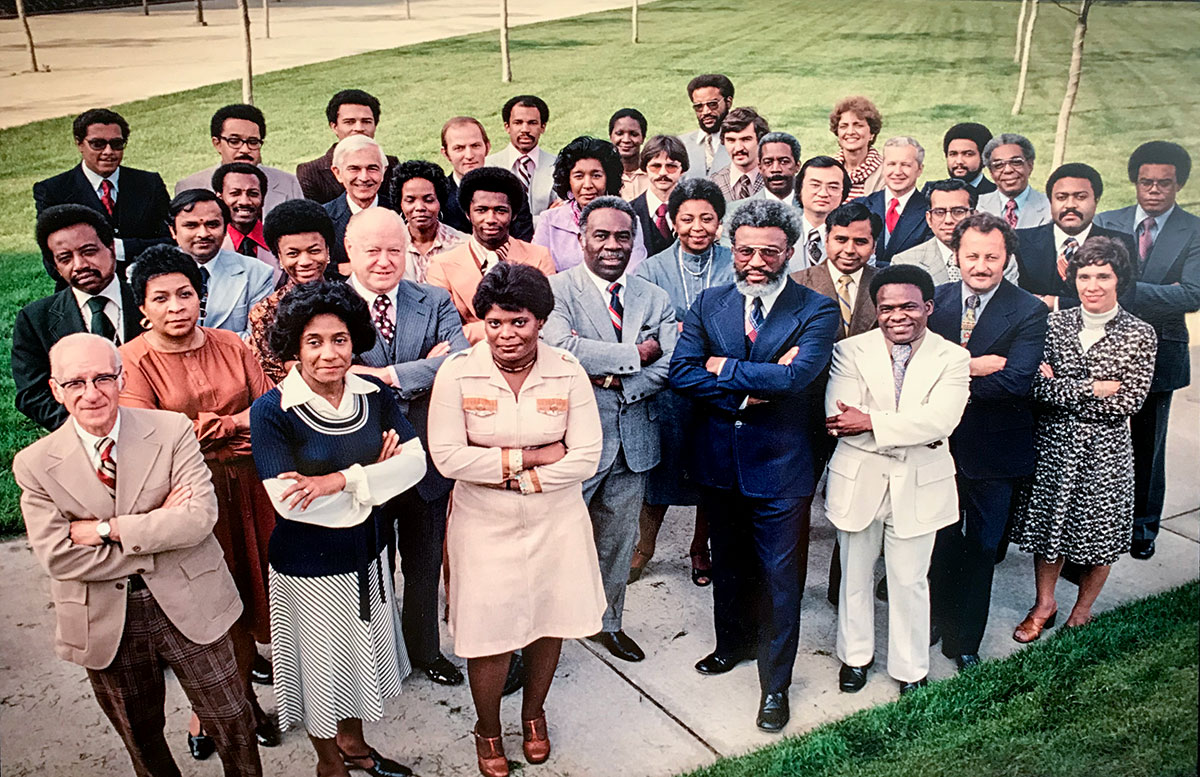
Madison (front middle) with his employees at Madison & Madison in 1972

On July 17, 1954, Madison established the Robert P. Madison International architectural firm in Cleveland, Ohio. This was the first black-owned architectural firm in Midwestern United States. The firm initially struggled financially due to the progressive foundation of the company.

In 1957, the firm entered every design competition announced and won Third Prize and Honorable Mention in the Ohio Home Competition. In 1958 the firm's design of the Mount Pleasant Medical Center won best design by the Cleveland Chamber of Commerce.

In 1965 the firm was selected to design the U.S. Embassy Office Building in Dakar, Senegal, West Africa. Its design won an award and recognition by the U.S. Department of State Foreign Building Operations. Madison has stated that this achievement was one of his proudest moments.

According to Crain's Cleveland Business, Robert P. Madison International is ranked no. 9 among architecture firms in northeast Ohio.

He retired in 2016.

== Designs and buildings ==
During the last 20 years, Robert P. Madison International has been both the lead and associate architects for the design of major projects in the Cleveland area, including the renovation of the Cleveland Public Library and design of its new Louis Stokes wing, the Downtown Hilton Hotel, Horseshoe Casino Cleveland, Cleveland Medical Mart and Huntington Convention Center, Cleveland Museum of Art, Cleveland Museum of Natural History, Quicken Loans Arena (now Rocket Mortgage FieldHouse), Cleveland Browns Stadium (Now FirstEnergy Stadium), Rock and Roll Hall of Fame and Museum, Great Lakes Science Center, GCRTA Waterfront Line, Willard Park Garage, Cleveland Hopkins International Airport Concourses C and D and Cafe, and the North Coast Harbor Master Plan.

Other buildings include:

- U.S. Embassy Office Building, Dakar, Senegal (1977)
- Industrial Bank of Washington, Washington, D.C. (1962)
- Plymouth Housing Estate, Detroit, Michigan (1970)
- Tuskegee University Engineering Nuclear Building, Tuskegee, Alabama (1966)
- Wayne County Justice Center, Wooster, Ohio (1976)
- State of Ohio Computer Center, Columbus, Ohio (1987)
- St. Johns A.M.E. Church, Niagara Falls, New York (1969)
- Mt. Pleasant Medical Center, Cleveland, Ohio (1957)

== Awards and honors ==
Madison has been awarded the American Institute of Architects Ohio Gold Medal Firm Award (1994) and the Cleveland Arts Prize (2000). He received an honorary doctorate from Howard University (1987). In 2002, he was inducted into the Northeast Ohio Business Hall of Fame.

== Personal life ==
Madison reports being "very close" to Coretta Scott, later the wife of Martin Luther King Jr., when he first returned from his war service, and was once engaged to her. In 1949, he married Leatrice Lucille Branch (died 2012). His life is the subject of the 2019 documentary, Deeds Not Words: Conversations with Robert P. Madison by Derek E. Morton. He published his memoir, Designing Victory (co-authored with the journalist, Carlo Wolff), in April 2019.
