= Beverly Lorraine Greene =

American architect (1915–1957)

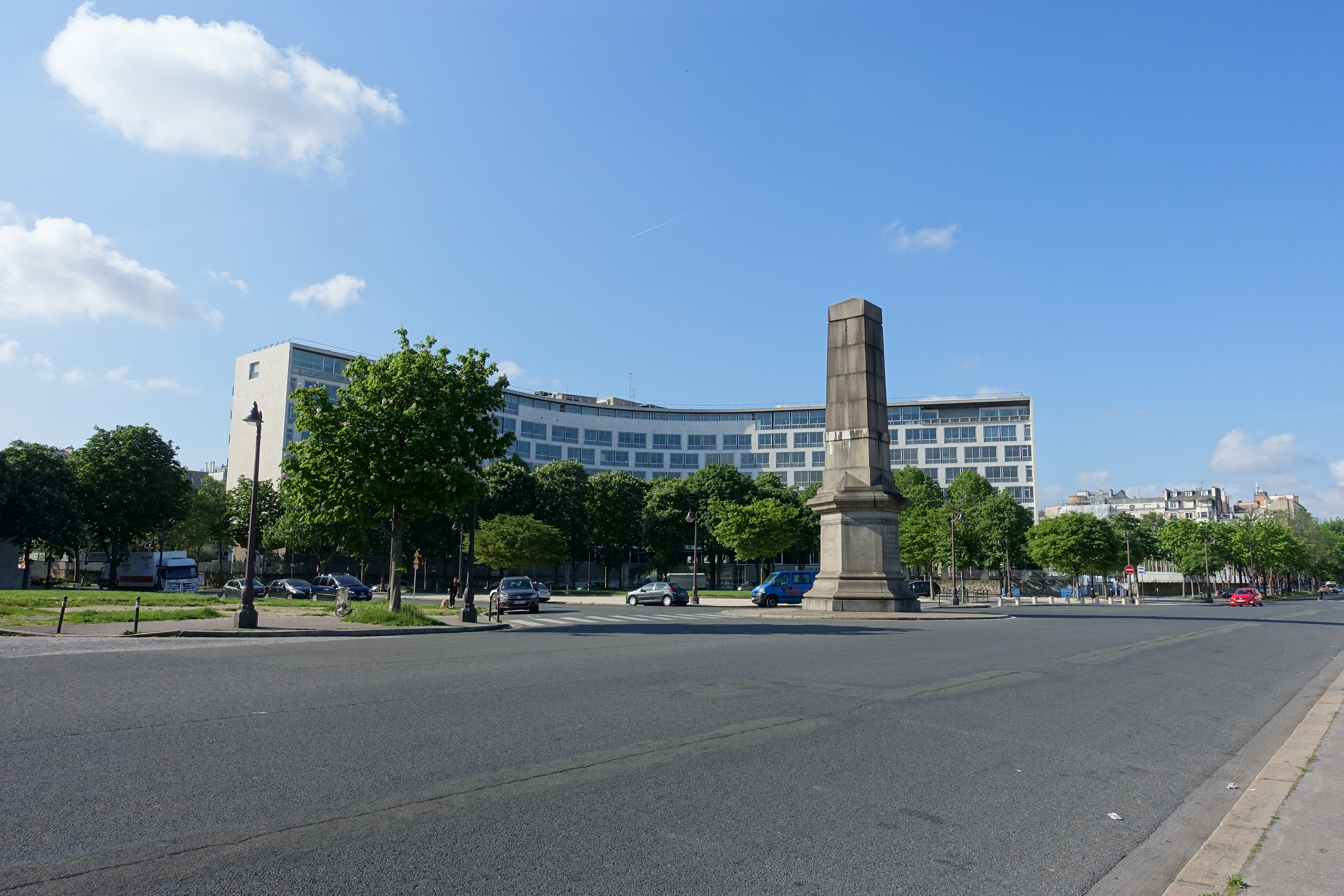
- Image of UNESCO Headquarters, designed by Greene
- Born: October 4, 1915; Chicago, Illinois, U.S.
- Died: August 22, 1957 (aged 41); New York City, U.S.
- Education: University of Illinois at Urbana–Champaign; Columbia University
- Occupation: Architect
- Known for: First female African-American licensed architect in the U.S.

Beverly Lorraine Greene (October 4, 1915 – August 22, 1957) was an American architect. According to architectural editor Dreck Spurlock Wilson, she was believed to be the first female African-American licensed architect in the United States. She was registered as an architect in Illinois in 1942, and worked on projects within the modernist movement, focusing on institutional, civic, and residential design.

== Early life and education ==
Beverly Lorraine Greene was born on October 4, 1915, to attorney James A. Greene and his wife Vera Greene in Chicago, Illinois. Her family was of African-American heritage, and she had no brothers or sisters. She attended the racially integrated University of Illinois at Urbana–Champaign (UIUC), graduating with a bachelor's degree in architectural engineering in 1936, and became the first African-American woman to earn this degree from the university. She was also involved in the drama club Cenacle and was a member of the American Society of Civil Engineers. The following year, 1937, she earned a master's degree from UIUC in city planning and housing.

== Career ==
Greene returned to Chicago and worked for Kenneth Roderick O'Neal's architecture firm in 1937, the first architectural office led by an African American in downtown Chicago, before she was hired by the Housing Authority in 1938. She became the first licensed African-American woman architect in the United States when she registered with the State of Illinois on December 28, 1942. Despite her credentials, she found it difficult to surmount race barriers to find work in the city. She and other black architects were routinely ignored by the mainstream Chicago press.

A 1945 newspaper report about the Metropolitan Life Insurance Company's development project at Stuyvesant Town led Greene to move to New York City. She submitted her application to help design it, in spite of the developer's racially segregated housing plans; and much to her surprise, she was hired as the first architect employed on the project. After only a few days, she quit the project to accept a scholarship at Columbia University where she studied urban planning. She earned a master's degree in architecture in June of 1945. After completing her degree she took a job with the firm of Isadore Rosenfield, which primarily designed health facilities. Though she remained in Rosenfield's employ until 1955, Greene worked with Edward Durell Stone on at least two projects in the early 1950s. In 1951, she was involved with the project to build the theater at the University of Arkansas and in 1952, she helped plan the Arts Complex at Sarah Lawrence College. After 1955, she worked with Marcel Breuer, assisting on designs for the UNESCO United Nations Headquarters in Paris and some of the buildings for the University Heights Campus of New York University, though both of those projects were completed after Greene's death.

== Death and legacy ==
Greene passed away on August 22, 1957, in New York City, at age 41. Her memorial service took place at the Unity Funeral Home in Manhattan, one of the buildings she had designed.

Her career was dedicated to showing young women that they can be successful and to serve as a role model for them, as well as people of different racial and ethnic groups who dream big, while facing backlash for joining or even just considering joining the career. She stated in a 1945 interview, "I wish that young women would think about this field. Never did I have one bit of trouble because I was a Negro but there have been arguments about hiring a woman. However, the War has ended that, and Negro women in the post-war world will have a fertile field in architecture. I wish some others would try it.” Using her knowledge in urban planning and architecture, she was widely respected among recognizable firms in Chicago and New York, and used her success to advocate for professional opportunities for others who have gone through the same experiences as her.

== Projects ==
Projects Greene worked on while working at Marcel Breuer's office (1951– 1957):

=== Grosse Point Public Library, 1951 ===
In the Grosse Point Public Library project in Grosse Point, Michigan, Greene worked as a draftsperson, which means she contributed to technical drawings, design development and translating Breuers ideas into buildable plans. Some important design choices Greene made were finding ways to help form to blend with function in a modernist way.

The library was designed to promote efficient and usable public space within a geometric layout. The library's rectangular layout includes large amounts of glass to allow natural light to enter the building, giving the open reading spaces a large amount of light.

This project was important to Greene’s career because it showed how she had an involvement in modernist architecture and public buildings. It’s also important to note that the Grosse Point Public Library became a key example of post WWII suburban Modernism, and reflects Greene’s dedication to that.

=== Winthrop House Rockefeller addition, 1952 ===
Greene helped by working as a draftsperson on the Winthrop House Rockefeller addition project in Tarrytown, New York. It was built to be a servant's quarters, and its goal was to improve the student living conditions on campus. Some design choices in this project, included a simple form with a focus on natural light. This addition was more contemporary, which was a way that it contrasted the original buildings on the Harvard Campus. This project was important to Greene’s career because it showed her involvement in big academic architecture projects, and showed her ability to collaborate well with others. This project also showed her role in post WWII architecture, by helping to design a more functional student housing situation by adding onto what is already there.

=== NYU's University Heights campus, 1956 ===
During Greene's time in New York, she worked on many projects that were connected to New York University (NYU). In the project for New York University Building Complex, University Heights campus in the Bronx, she collaborated with Edward Durell Stone and Associates to help modernize NYU’s campus. Goals of this project include more support for the growing student population on campus, to create efficient residential and academic spaces for the students, and to create a more modernized campus appearance.

This project was very relevant to Greene's career, as it played a large role in shaping post WWII architecture. The campus's design demonstrated that a modernist approach to architecture was applicable to college campuses, instead of just suburban neighborhoods as previously thought.

=== UNESCO Headquarters, 1954–1957 ===
The UNESCO Headquarters project at Secretariat and Conference Hall in Place de Fontenoy, Paris was a major international collaboration. Greene worked with architects Marcel Breuer, Bernard Zehrfuss, and Pier Luigi Nervi. Greene's contributions were mainly in the design, development, and production phases of the project, however, she was not credited as one of the lead designers. Additionally, this project's design had a distinctive Y-shaped Secretariat building, and the integration of the Conference hall was done through coordination with the structure and forms.

Her role in this project shows that most of the time, while working on large modernist projects, there is a large number of architects contributing behind the scenes. Her work also reflects the historical context of racial and gender barriers.

=== Unity Funeral Home, 1964 ===
Unlike previous projects, Greene designed the Unity Funeral Home in Harlem, New York City independently. This project was designed during a time when architecture rarely reflected Harlem's African American community's culture with care. Because of this, Greene's design priorities focused on creating a respectful spatial experience for mourning and gathering, as well as creating a space that felt modern but not cold, therefore balancing professionalism with emotional interpretation of the space.

This project is one of the few documented built works by Greene and contrasts with her other works, such as the UNESCO Headquarters .

== See also ==
- African-American architects

== Sources ==
- Thompson, Lowell D. (2012). African Americans in Chicago. Arcadia Publishing. ISBN 978-0738588537.
- Wilson, Dreck Spurlock (2004). African American Architects: A Biographical Dictionary, 1865–1945. New York: Routledge. ISBN 9780415929592.
