= Elizabeth Carter Brooks =

American educator, activist, and architect

- Born: Elizabeth Carter; 1867; New Bedford, Massachusetts, United States
- Died: 1951 (aged 83–84); New Bedford, Massachusetts, United States
- Education: Harringon Normal School for Teachers
- Occupations: Educator, social activist, architect
- Spouse: W. Sampson Brooks

Elizabeth Carter Brooks (1867–1951), was an American educator, social activist and architect. She was passionate about helping other African Americans achieve personal success and was one of the first to recognize the importance of preserving historical buildings in the United States. Brooks was "one of the few Black women of the era who could be considered both architect and patron."

== Early life ==
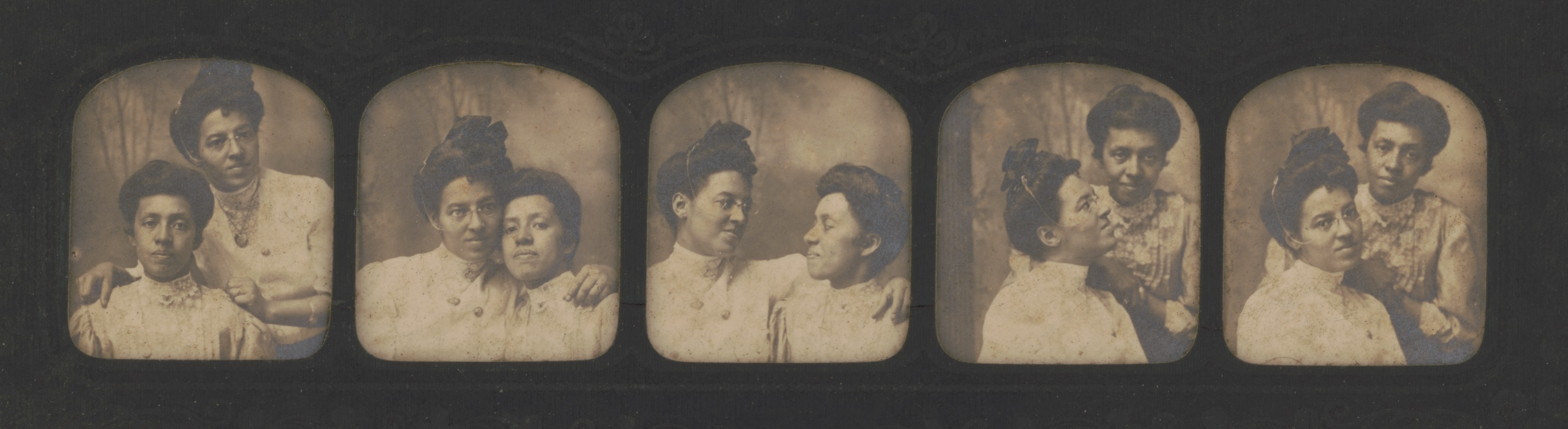
Elizabeth Brooks with Emma Hackley (in spectacles).

Brooks was born in New Bedford, Massachusetts, which was an area of the country well known at the time for providing refuge, resources, education and employment for former slaves. Her mother, Martha Webb, had been a former slave, owned by President John Tyler. Webb was involved with the Underground Railroad. Her daughter went on to develop a "passion for equality" that lasted her entire life.

Brooks attended New Bedford High School, and then went on to the Swain Free School, which provided students with a strong foundation in design and architecture skills. She then went on to become the first African American graduate of the Harrington Normal School for Teachers.

== Career ==
Brooks began teaching in the early 1890s at Howard's Orphan Home or Howard Colored Orphan Asylum in Brooklyn, which was founded and run by African Americans.

In 1895, she started working with the National Association of Colored Women's Clubs (NACWC). She became the secretary of the Convention in 1896 and vice-president from 1906 to 1908. She succeeded Lucy Thurman as the 4th president of NACWC from 1908 until 1912. Brooks also joined the National Association for the Advancement of Colored People (NAACP) shortly after it was founded and later created her own NAACP chapter in New Bedford. She would be honored as a president emeritus of the New Bedford NAACP in 1948.

Brooks was one of the founders of the New England Federation of Women's Clubs (later the Northeastern Federation of Colored Women's Clubs). She was president for over 27 years and during her time in the club, "oversaw the sponsorship of community centers, scholarship funds, day care centers, and other services needed by the community."

In 1897, Brooks helped open the New Bedford Home for the Aged, which at first had several temporary locations. In addition, Brooks paid the rent for the home by herself for the first six months. Afterwards, the Women's Loyal Union "assumed the responsibility for maintaining the New Bedford Home for the Aged." Brooks eventually designed the Colonial style permanent home for its final location at 396 Middle Street. The Women's Loyal Union, which Brooks was involved with, continued to help support the home at the new location. Brooks became the first president of the home and of the Women's Loyal Union, and remained in those roles until 1930. The building itself is still standing in New Bedford and is two and half stories tall, topped with a hip roof, six dormers and a front facade with a flat-roofed portico.

Brooks began teaching again, this time in 1901 at the Taylor School, where she became the first African American teacher in New Bedford.

In 1918, she was recruited by the War Council of the National board of the YWCA to supervise and oversee the building of the Phillis Wheatley YWCA in Washington, D.C.

In 1929, she retired from teaching. That same year, she married W. Sampson Brooks, who was the bishop of the African Methodist Episcopal denomination of the Bethel Church. She and her husband moved to San Antonio, where they lived together until her husband's death in 1934. After that, she moved back to New Bedford.

In 1939, she began her work on preserving Black heritage. Brooks felt that "monuments to 'race history' were an important part of the African American landscape and deserved to be preserved. She bought the home of William H. Carney and turned the home into a memorial.

After her death in 1951, the city of New Bedford honored her by naming a school after her in 1957.
