= Hilyard Robinson =

African-American architect, engineer (1899–1986)

Hilyard Robert Robinson
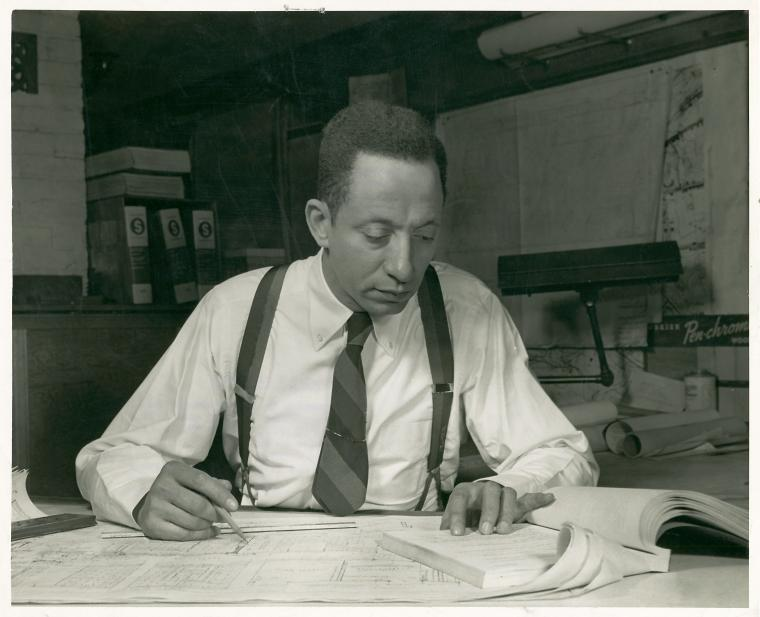
- Robinson working on plans and specifications for a new war-housing projects at Ypsilanti, Michigan
- Born: Hilyard Robert Robinson; December 3, 1899; Washington, D.C., U.S.
- Died: July 2, 1986 (aged 86); Washington, D.C., U.S.
- Education: University of Pennsylvania; University of the Arts, Philadelphia; Columbia University (GSAPP)
- Occupations: Architect, teacher, engineer
- Employer(s): Howard University, Harvard University
- Spouse: Helena Rooks

Hilyard Robert Robinson (December 3, 1899 – July 2, 1986) was an American architect, teacher, and engineer. He was a prominent early Black architect in the United States, and influenced a generation of students.

Born and raised in Washington, D.C., Robinson graduated from M Street High School in 1916, part of its last class. He enlisted in the 167th Brigade of the Army's Field Artillery Branch, where he toured Europe during World War One. Returning home, Robinson graduated from Columbia University in 1924 with a degree in architecture, later obtaining a master's from the same university. He went on to design several pieces, including the Langston Terrace Dwellings from 1935 to 1938. According to one historian, Robinson's "enduring contribution is a significant body of architecture that conveys his distinctly rational and human interpretation of Modernism". He died at Howard University Medical Center in 1986.

== Early life ==
Hilyard Robert Robinson was born on December 3, 1899, in Washington, D.C., to Michael and Elizabeth Robinson. According to census data, Michael was a private in the U. S. Army; Hilyard's grandfather owned a barbershop where Hilyard shined shoes. When Hilyard's father died, Elizabeth took a job as a seamstress and moved him to his grandmother's house in Foggy Bottom.

Robinson graduated Thaddeus Stevens School and from M Street High School in 1916, part of its last class. He then studied at the Pennsylvania Museum and School of Industrial Arts (now University of the Arts, Philadelphia) for one year, majoring in Commercial Art, before joining the 167th Brigade of the Army's Field Artillery Branch.

== Military service and life as an architect ==
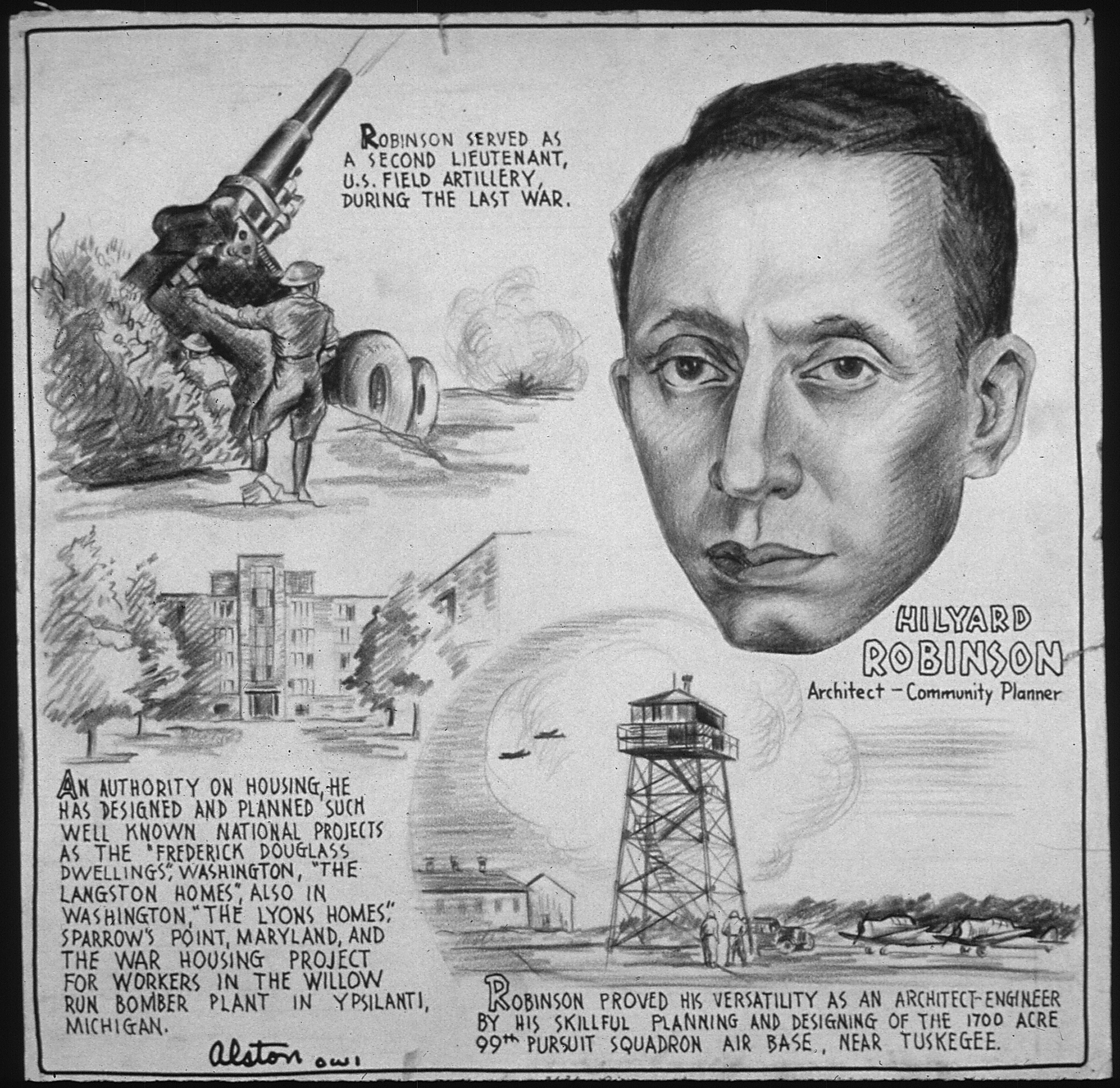
Illustration of Hilyard Robinson by Charles Henry Alston

During World War I, Robinson served as a U.S. Army artillery officer where he spent time in Paris at the Armistice and observed the style of the buildings there. Upon his return to the United States, Robinson transferred to the University of Pennsylvania before eventually graduating from Columbia University in 1924 with a degree in architecture and working for several architectural firms and teaching at Howard University.

In 1931, after he married Helena Rooks and completed a master's degree at Columbia, the Robinsons went to Europe to study in Germany, where Robinson was influenced by the Bauhaus style, as well as Scandinavia, France and elsewhere.

Robinson taught architecture at Howard University from the 1920s to 1960s, and he also designed many campus buildings.

The U.S. Department of the Interior commissioned Robinson to build the Langston Terrace Dwellings (1935–1938) for which he gained prominence, and Robinson also served as an architectural consultant to the government of Liberia. Robinson worked closely with other American architects such as Ralph A. Vaughn and Paul Williams. He had served as a mentor in 1945 to emerging architect Henry Clifford Boles.

== Retirement, death and legacy ==
Robinson died on July 2, 1986, at Howard University Medical Center. According to one historian in African American Architects: A Biographical Dictionary, 1865–1945, Robinson's "enduring contribution is a significant body of architecture that conveys his distinctly rational and human interpretation of Modernism".

The Langston Terrace Dwellings were listed on the National Register of Historic Places in 1987.

== Notable works ==
- Aberdeen Gardens (Hampton, Virginia) (1934)
- Langston Terrace Dwellings (1935–1938)
- Ralph Bunche House (Washington, D.C.) (1941)
- Sharpe Field Airport (1941)
- 99th Pursuit Squadron Airfield and Training Base (1941), Cheaha, Alabama; with Percy C. Ifill
- George Washington Carver dormitory (1942), Howard University, Washington, D.C.; with Percy C. Ifill
- Parkridge Homes (1943), Ypsilanti, Michigan; a war-housing project developed for Black workers of the Willow Run Bomber Plant
- Liberian Centennial Victory Exposition (1945–1947), Monrovia, Liberia; with Percy C. Ifill
- Arthur Capper/Carrollsburg (1958)
- Multiple Howard University buildings (Cramton Hall, the Ira Aldridge Theater, the School of Engineering, the Home Economics Building (now School of Human Ecology), Locke Hall)
- Cherry Hill Public Housing, Baltimore, Maryland (1945)

== Works cited ==
- Ethridge, Harrison Mosley (1979). The Black Architects of Washington, D.C., 1900–Present (PhD thesis). OCLC 1135586457.
- Wilson, Dreck Spurlock (March 2004). African American Architects: A Biographical Dictionary, 1865–1945. Routledge. pp. 492–499. ISBN 978-1-135-95629-5.
