= Georgia Institute of Technology College of Design =

Architecture school at the Georgia Institute of Technology

Coordinates: 33.7761°N 84.3957°W

College of Design
- Type: Public
- Established: 1908
- Dean: Ellen Bassett
- Faculty: 252
- Undergraduates: 595
- Postgraduates: 552
- Location: Atlanta, Georgia, United States
- Website: design.gatech.edu

The College of Design at the Georgia Institute of Technology, established in 1908 as the Department of Architecture and also formerly called the College of Architecture, offered the first four-year course of study in architecture in the Southern United States.

== History ==
The history of the College of Design spans over 100 years. The Department of Architecture was formed in 1908, and granted its first degree in 1911. It was renamed the School of Architecture after World War II, and elevated to a full-fledged College of Architecture in 1975. In 2016, it was renamed the College of Design in order to more accurately reflect the breadth of programs the College offers, and to reduce confusion between the College of Architecture and its component School of Architecture. For most of the 20th century, the Architecture curriculum was directed by masters of architecture, mostly Harvard graduates (until 1975).

In 1908, Georgia Tech (as the "Georgia School of Technology") formally began teaching architecture, when Preston A. Hopkins of Boston was appointed to teach the entering class of 20 students and organize the curriculum. The new Department of Architecture, although small, was equal in rank to other academic departments of engineering at Tech. Francis Palmer Smith (B.S. Univ. of Pennsylvania 1907) was selected as the first department head in 1909. In 1911, the first degrees, the Bachelor of Science in Architecture, were granted. This event placed Georgia Tech among the earliest public universities in the U. S. to offer an architecture degree. By 1912, the Department of Architecture grew to 42 full-time students with three faculty members.

By 1930, the Architecture department had 132 full-time students, awarded 20 degrees, and had six full-time with six part-time faculty. The curriculum during the early years was closely allied with engineering, and the subject of construction was strongly emphasized. By the 1930s, the influence of the Beaux-Arts, formerly a dominant force in architectural education nationally, had begun to decline as the sway of Bauhaus increased. The department did not have the post-professional graduate program or an option for architectural engineering, both of which were contained in over half of the architecture schools at the time. Architectural education was mainly a product of local concerns in Atlanta, in Georgia and the South, in accordance with the mission of the Georgia School of Technology. In 1934, the five-year Bachelor of Architecture degree was created to conform with the requirements of the increasingly influential Association of Collegiate Schools of Architecture (ACSA). Under the leadership of Bush-Brown, the Architecture students declined to 66 during the depression, reached a low of 22 students during World War II, and then exploded to 462 post-war students.

In 1948, the new School of Architecture was formed and made parallel to other professional schools within the newly renamed Georgia Institute of Technology. In 1952, the School of Architecture building, designed by Bush-Brown, Gailey and Heffernan, was constructed, creating a separate identity for the school, with a highly professional curriculum. In 1975, the College of Architecture was formed to handle increased enrollment and strengthening of allied disciplines. William Fash (Oklahoma State University, M.ARCH, 1960) was appointed as first dean of Architecture in 1976. In 1975, with respect to its international thrust, the college's Paris Program was established by P. M. Heffernan. Originally located at the Ecole d'Architecture Paris Tolbiac and moved to the Ecole d'Architecture Paris la Villette, the Program provides for a full year of study for architecture students during their senior year of undergraduate study. In 1992, a Division of Fine Arts was created in the College of Architecture, leading to a new Arts and Technology Program for course work in the areas of music, visual arts, and multimedia.

In 1972, William J. Stanley III became the first African American to graduate from the college of architecture, and in 1977, his wife, Ivenue Love-Stanley became the first African-American woman to graduate from the college.

In 1995, the Center for Geographic Information Systems (CGIS) was created. The CGIS has worked on projects for the 1999 Color Infra-Red (CIR) Digital Ortho Photo Program, for the Georgia GIS Data Clearinghouse, for the NWI-Wetlands statewide digital wetland database with GIS tools, for the Trees Atlanta-Greenspace Acquisition Support System, the U.S. Environmental Protection Agency-Air Quality, natural hazards, hydrography, and for infrastructure management.

In 2008, the Georgia Tech Center for Music Technology (GTCMT) was established as an interdisciplinary research center.

== Schools ==
- School of Architecture
- Building Construction : School of Building Construction
- City & Regional Planning : School of City and Regional Planning
- Industrial Design : School of Industrial Design
- Music : School of Music

== Facilities ==
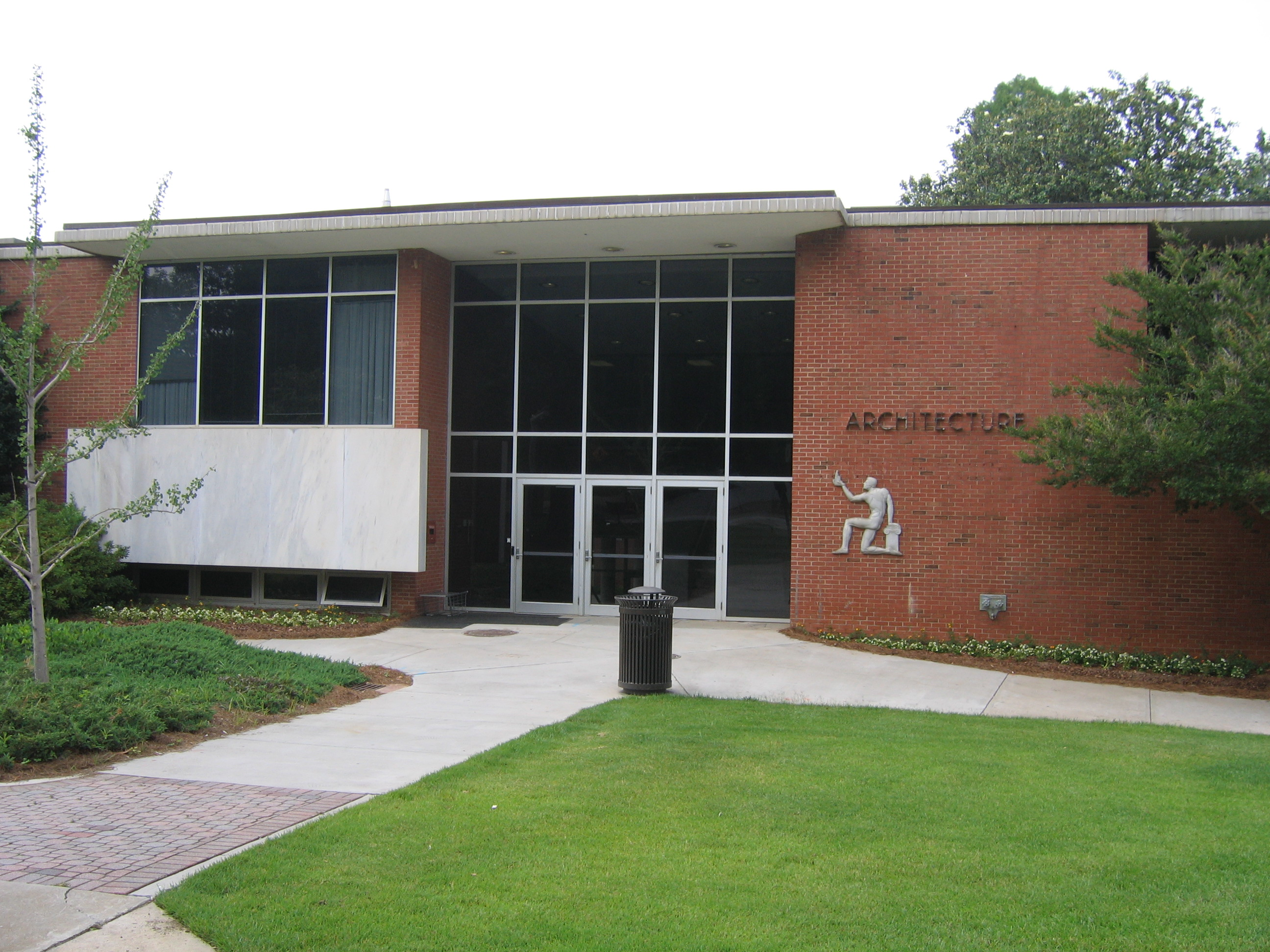
Architecture East

The College of Design occupies several buildings and spaces throughout campus, the center of which are the two main buildings - College of Architecture East and West - in the center of the campus on Fourth Street.

- College of Architecture East Building
  - Constructed in 1952 as the college's first home
  - Designed by the firm Bush-Brown, Gailey, and Heffernan, a firm composed two former program leaders
  - Contains College Auditorium, City and Regional Planning program office, and PhD program office
  - Studio and computer labs used for Industrial Design and Architecture programs
  - College of Design Wood Shop
- College of Architecture West Building
  - Constructed in 1979 with classrooms and jury space around a large, open atrium
  - Contains Dean's Office, Architecture program office, Industrial Design program office, and Architecture Library
  - Studio and computer labs used for Common First Year, Industrial Design, and Architecture programs
- John and Joyce Caddell Building
  - Located behind West Building
  - Contains Building Construction program office and Center for GIS
- Hinman Building
  - Located behind of the Georgia Tech Library to the north
  - Renovated by Office dA and Lord Aeck Sargent adding 14,500 square feet (1,350 m^{2}) of studio and instructional space, 3,700 square feet (340 m^{2}) of faculty office space, and 6,620 square feet (615 m^{2}) of research space
- Couch Building
  - Located on West Campus, amongst residence halls
  - Houses Music Department offices, performance, and practice space
  - Formerly contained Under the Couch, a student-operated music club, which has since been relocated to the Student Center
- The "Church"
  - Located on 10th Street
  - Contains Center for Assistive Technology and Environmental Access
- Digital Fabrication Lab (DFL) (formerly Advanced Woods Product Laboratory (AWPL))
  - Located on Marietta Street
  - Contains wood and metal workshops along with a couple of CNC machines

== Degrees ==
A complete list is available on the College of Design website.

=== Undergraduate ===
- B.S. in Architecture - A four-year, pre-professional program in Architecture (not B.Arch.)
- B.S. in Industrial Design
- B.S. in Music Technology

=== Graduate ===
- Master of Architecture 3.5-year track - A professional program in Architecture for students who earned a non-architecture undergraduate degree.
- Master of Architecture 2-year track - A professional program in Architecture for students who earned an undergraduate degree in architecture.
- M.S. with concentrations in:
  - Advanced Production
  - Building Construction and Facility Management
  - Building Information and Systems
  - Design and Health
  - Design Computation
  - High Performance Buildings
  - Human-Computer Interaction
  - Geographic Information Science & Technology
- M.S. in Urban Design
- M. City and Regional Planning
- Master of Industrial Design (MID) - 2-year and 3-year track
- M.S. in Music Technology

=== Postgraduate ===
- Ph.D. with major in:
  - Architecture
  - Building Construction
  - City & Regional Planning
  - Music Technology

== Notable College of Design alumni ==
Name	Class year	Notability	Reference(s)
Michael Arad	1999	Designer architect of the World Trade Center Memorial in New York City; he was selected from 5,201 competitors as the winning designer with "Reflecting Absence"	
Merrill Elam	1967	Principal of Mack Scogin Merrill Elam Architects, husband-wife team who are internationally acclaimed for unconventional use of materials in narrative associations in their designs.	
Jan Lorenc	1994	Prominent designer; co-owner of Lorenc+Yoo Design	
Jerome "Jerry" Cooper	1952	Chairman of the Board of the Cooper Carry in Atlanta, Georgia; designed the West Architecture Building for the College of Architecture.	
John Portman	1950	Architect who designed several buildings; examples are the SunTrust Plaza, and the Westin Peachtree Plaza Hotel	
Mack Scogin	1967	Principal of Mack Scogin Merrill Elam Architects, husband-wife team who are internationally acclaimed for unconventional use of materials in narrative associations in their designs.	
Hugh Stubbins Jr.	1933	Architect who designed several high-profile buildings around the world	
Janice Wittschiebe	1980	Principal of Richard Wittschiebe Hand Architects, prominent Atlanta architecture firm, former President of the Georgia Tech Alumni Association, member of the Georgia Tech Foundation Board	
Vern Yip	1995	Designer on Trading Spaces	
