= Cheryl McAfee =

Cheryl McAfee may refer to:

- Cheryl L. McAfee (born c. 1958), African American architect
- Cheryl McAfee (rugby union) (born 1975), Australian rugby union player
