= Ivenue Love-Stanley =

American architect

- Born: Ivenue Love; 1951 (age 74–75); Meridian, Mississippi, U.S.
- Education: Millsaps College, Georgia Institute of Technology College of Architecture
- Occupation: Architect
- Spouse: William J. Stanley III

Ivenue Love-Stanley, FAIA, NOMA (born 1951) is an American architect. She co-founded Stanley, Love-Stanley P.C., an Atlanta-based architecture and design firm. She was the first African-American woman to graduate from Georgia Institute of Technology's College of Architecture, and in 1983 she became the first African-American woman licensed architect in the Southeast.

Love-Stanley's projects include the Aquatic Center for the 1996 Centennial Olympic Games, the Lyke House Catholic Student Center at the Atlanta University Center, the Southwest YMCA and St. Paul's Episcopal Church (which won awards from the National Organization of Minority Architects), the Auburn Market in Sweet Auburn and the National Black Arts Festival headquarters.

== Biography ==
Raised in Meridian, Mississippi, Love-Stanley earned her Bachelor of Science in Mathematics from Millsaps College in 1972 and a Master of Architecture from Georgia Institute of Technology in 1977. Love-Stanley has been a strong supporter of Georgia Tech's inclusion efforts, offering an annual award for a student mentoring program that rewards students of African descent with strong academic credentials with a scholarship and internship. She has also served as a Georgia Tech alumni trustee and a member of their National Advisory Board.

With her husband William J. "Bill" Stanley III, she co-founded Stanley, Love-Stanley, P.C. in 1978 which has become the second largest African-American architectural practice in the South. Her work with the NOMA included the creation of formal connections with the American Institute of Architects. During the 1996 Summer Olympic Games, Love-Stanley designed and oversaw the design of the Olympic Aquatic Center in a joint venture, and the installation of a "Celebrate Africa" exhibit and performance. Later she provided design services for Youth Art Connection, a gallery and art hub for the Boys and Girls Clubs of Metro Atlanta.

Love-Stanley served on several historic preservation boards as well as on the City of Atlanta's Zoning Review Board. Love-Stanley served for eight years on the Board of Directors of the Atlanta Midtown Improvement District which oversees capital improvement projects in Midtown Atlanta. She also supported the effort to designate Atlanta's West End neighborhood as a national historic district, volunteering to review documents, prepare drawings and serving as a consultant. While on the board of the Atlanta Preservation Center, she stopped the demolition of several landmark buildings and led the restoration of the Herndon Home Museum (once owned by Alonzo Herndon, one of the wealthiest African-Americans in the U.S.). Love-Stanley also contributed her services pro bono to the design and development of the Sweet Auburn Avenue project which worked to revitalize the area in Atlanta around the Martin Luther King Jr. National Historical Park and APEX Museum, just east of Downtown Atlanta.

She has won many community and professional service citations for her work in redevelopment of the historic districts of Atlanta as well as her advocacy for minority inclusion in the architectural profession.

== Awards and honors ==
Love-Stanley is involved in community service work as well as architectural design. Two of Stanley Love-Stanley, P.C. projects—the Horizon Sanctuary (which houses the Ebenezer Baptist Church), and the sculpture at John Westley Dobbs Plaza in Atlanta—are featured in Judith Dupre's book, "Monuments: America's History in Art and Memory" (Random House, 2007).

Some awards and honors for her work are:

- Named one of the "top women architects" in 1995 by Ebony magazine
- Cathedral at Turner Chapel (the largest African Methodist Episcopal Church in the world): 2008 Brick in Architecture Award, the Silver in "Houses of Worship" category
- Appointed to the Atlanta Urban Design Commission in 2005
- Appointed to the Georgia State Board of Architects and Interior Designers, from 2003–2012
- 2014 Whitney M. Young Jr. Award, American Institute of Architects

== See also ==
- African Americans in Atlanta
- African-American architects
- Cheryl L. McAfee
