= Marshall Purnell =

American architect (born 1950)

Marshall Emmiett Purnell
- Born: June 8, 1950 (age 76); Toledo, Ohio, U.S.
- Education: University of Michigan

Marshall Emmiett Purnell FAIA NOMA (born June 8, 1950) is an American architect. He co-founded the architecture firm, Devrouax+Purnell in Washington, D.C. In 2008, he was the president of the American Institute of Architects.

== Early life and education ==
Marshall Emmiett Purnell was born June 8, 1950, in Toledo, Ohio. He was raised in Grand Rapids, Michigan. He is from an African-American family and is the second son of the late Lelia (née Givens) Purnell and Curtis Purnell. He attended Ottawa Hills High School where he played point guard on its state high school championship-winning basketball team. Though he was recruited by the Boston Red Sox, he chose not to pursue sports.

Purnell earned a B.S. degree in architecture and urban planning, and a M.Arch degree from the Taubman College of Architecture and Urban Planning at the University of Michigan, Ann Arbor.

== Career ==
After earning his degree, Purnell taught design until 1973 at the University of Maryland. Following that, he joined the American Institute of Architecture in 1974, working as an executive in the headquarters in Washington, D.C., until 1978.

In the summer of 1978, four months prior to Purnell leaving his executive position, Paul S. Devrouax, a well-esteemed architect with an already established firm proposed to Purnell, a partnership that would later be known as the firm Devrouax+Purnell. He served as the design principal and vice president of the firm for thirty-five years, until the death of the co-founder, Paul S. Devrouax in 2010.

Purnell was the president of the National Organization of Minority Architects in 1985 and 1986. In 1994, he served as president of the College of Architecture and Planning Alumni Association Board of Governors and was a member of the University of Michigan Alumni Association Executive Committee from 1996 to 2003.

In 2006, Marshall was elected as the first African American architect to serve as the national president on the American Institute of Architects in 150 years; an organization that did not allow membership of African Americans until 1923. His inauguration marked a significant step to diversifying the fields of Architecture and Design.

In 2007, he received the University of Michigan Distinguished Service Award and Michigan's College of Architecture Service Award whereupon he presented the Commencement Address. In 2009, he received an honorary Doctorate of Architecture from the Boston Architectural College.

In 2014, Purnell joined the College of Design at North Carolina State University in Raleigh. He took the position of Professor of the Practice, Teaching Professional Practice, Design Studios, IDP Coordinator, AIAT Board Member, AIAS representative and Advisory Board Coordinator.

== Notable work ==
As the design principal of Devrouax+Purnell, some firm projects include:

- Washington Convention Center
- Washington Nationals Baseball Park
- Verizon Center, the Washington NBA and NHL venue
- PEPCO Energy’s corporate headquarters
- FreddieMac corporate Headquarters
- the Martin Luther King, Jr. Memorial
- several projects for the Washington Metropolitan Area Transportation Authority
- modernization projects at U.S. Embassies in Moscow and the former Yugoslavia

== Publications ==
- M. Purnell, (1975) “The Federal Market Place: Are you Prepared?” (American Institute of Architects)
- M. Purnell, L. Spiller (1976), (1978) “A Directory of Minority Architectural and Engineering Firms” (American Institute of Architects, American Consulting Engineers Council)
