= McAdams Park =

City park in Wichita, Kansas

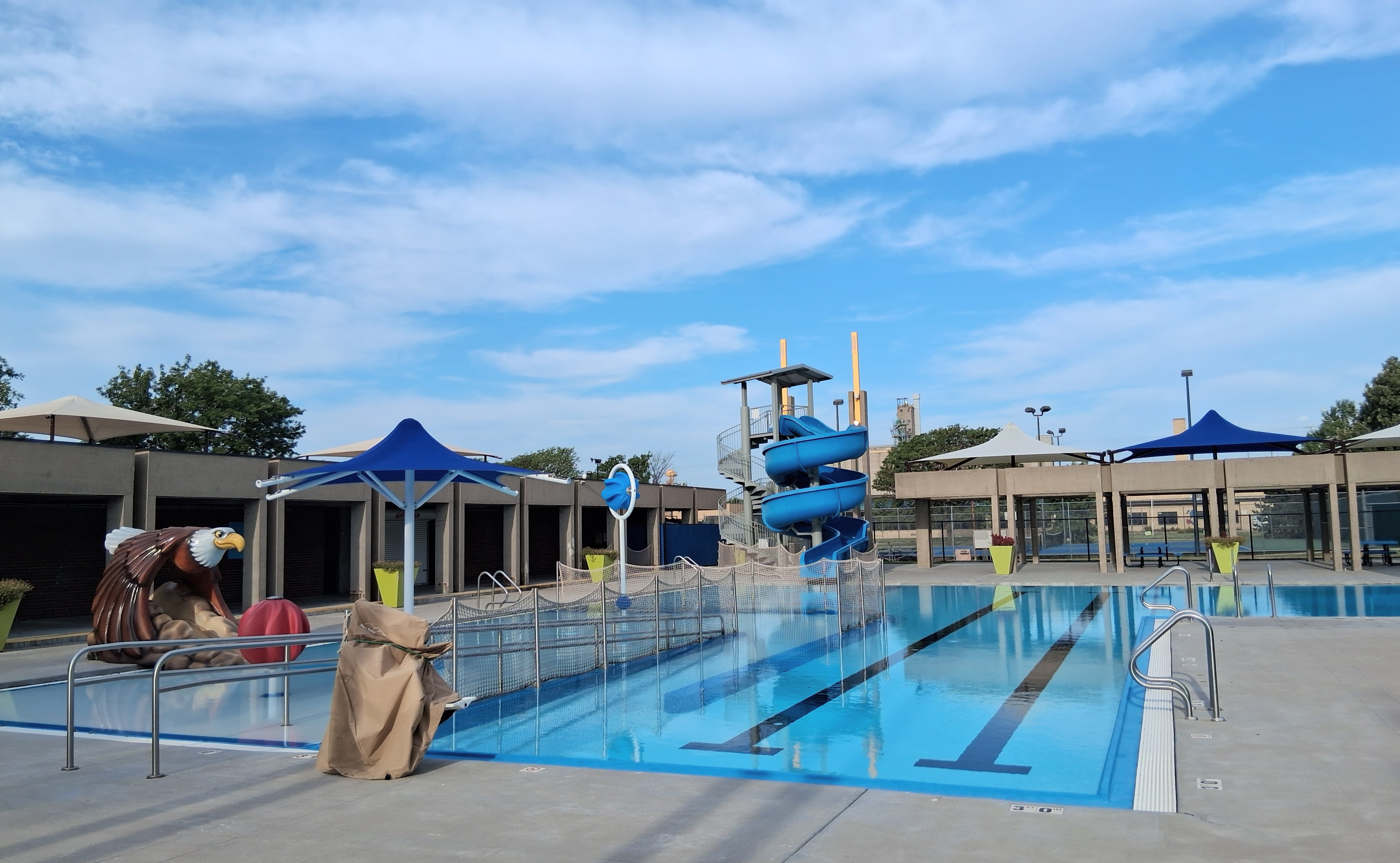
- McAfee Swimming Pool at McAdams Park in 2026
- Interactive map of McAdams Park
- Location: 1329 E. 13th Street, Wichita, Kansas
- Coordinates: 37°42′43″N 97°19′21″W
- Opened: 1901, as McKinley Park
- Operator: City of Wichita Department of Parks and Recreation
- Website: www.wichita.gov/facilities/facility/details/mcadamspark-46

McAdams Park, formerly McKinley Park, is a city park, baseball field, and swimming pool built in 1901 and located at 1329 E. 13th Street in Wichita, Kansas, United States.

== History ==
The park was originally 12 acres (4.9 ha) and was named McKinley Park when it opened in 1901. Later parcels were added in 1941, 1946, and 1980.

In 1966, the City of Wichita renamed McKinley Park to McAdams Park in honor of the late Emerson McAdams. McAdams, a former city policeman, served 27 years as director of McKinley Park. He died October 20, 1965, aged 52. Facilities at the park were enhanced in 1968 in conjunction with construction of the canal route. Land and Water Conservation Funds, provided by the Kansas Department of Wildlife, Parks and Tourism and the National Park Service, have been used to develop this park.

The city's first artificial turf baseball diamond was constructed in 2016, and a new restroom and concession stand was constructed in 2017. In 2020, the McAdams Pool was renamed the McAfee Pool, named after Charles F. McAfee the Black architect who built the park pool in 1969.

== Jackie Robinson statue ==
In 2021, a bronze statue of Jackie Robinson was erected by League 42, a youth baseball program. In January 2024, the statue, made of 95% copper, was cut down at the ankles with the cleats remaining. Parts of the statue were found days later in a local park and it was determined the artwork was meant to melted down for the value of its metal. An arrest followed three weeks later and it was further determined that the theft was not based on a hate crime act. A recast statue was unveiled on August 5, 2024.
