= Charles F. McAfee =

American architect (born 1932)

Charles Francis McAfee
- Born: December 25, 1932 (age 93); Los Angeles, California, U.S.
- Other name: Charles McAfee
- Education: University of Nebraska–Lincoln
- Occupations: Architect, building material manufacturer, activist
- Spouse: Gloria Myrth Winston
- Children: 3, including Cheryl L. McAfee
- Awards: Whitney Young Award (1999)

Charles Francis McAfee, FAIA, NOMA (born December 25, 1932), is an American architect, building material manufacturer, and housing activist. He was the founding president of Charles F. McAfee Architects, Engineers, and Planners firm (now McAfee^{3}) which was headquartered in Wichita, Kansas. McAfee has had a distinguished career, and has been considered one of the most important African-American architect in the United States for his social activism in designing affordable housing. He was a mentor to many of Black architects, including two of his own daughters.

== Early life ==
Charles Francis McAfee was born on December 25, 1932, in Los Angeles, California, to parents Willie Anna (née Brown) and Arthur James McAfee. He served with United States Army from 1953 to 1955, during the end of the Korean War and was sent to Germany.

McAfee graduated with a B.Arch in 1958 from University of Nebraska–Lincoln.

== Career ==
McAfee was one of the first black registered architects in the State of Kansas. In 1963, McAfee began his own firm in Wichita, Kansas. Through the years, Charles F. McAfee Architects, Engineers and Planners expanded and opened satellite offices in Dallas and Atlanta.

McAfee was known for his modernist designs. In 1966, his “convertible” design allowed for flexibility in creating spaces with limited or confined infill lot locations. He tackled social inequalities with a focus on designing affordable housing and utilized a modular approach.

In order to build the modular building components, Mc Afee opened a manufacturing plant in 1994 that hired and trained people from the community. McAfee Manufacturing Company, Inc. hired and trained workers from the Wichita area. In 1999, the manufacturing plant was shut down after facing debt.

In 1976, he served as president of the National Organization of Minority Architects (NOMA), and is one of NOMA's 45 charter members. He also served as president of the National Business League, and president of the Urban League of Wichita.

In 1981, McAfee was elected to the Fellow of the American Institute of Architects (FAIA).

In 2006, McAfee transitioned ownership of his firm to Cheryl Lynn McAfee Mitchell and Charyl Frena McAfee-Duncan, his daughters. McAfee manages the firm's Atlanta office, and McAfee-Duncan directs the Dallas office.

== Awards and honors ==
In 1999, McAfee received the prestigious Whitney Young Award from the American Institute of Architects at the AIA National Convention and Expo in Dallas, Texas.

In 2020, the Wichita McAdams Park Pool was renamed the McAfee Pool in his honor. Built in 1969, the pool is listed on the National Register of Historic Places.

In addition, McAfee received the Excellence in Architecture honor from Kansas AIA, and the Building Innovation for Homeownership award from the United States Department of Housing and Urban Development.

== Personal life ==
In 1955, McAfee married his childhood friend and singer, Gloria Myrth Winston. The couple had three daughters. Two of his daughters, Cheryl L. McAfee and Charyl Frena McAfee-Duncan, are also notable architects and serve in leadership positions at McAfee^{3} Architects in Atlanta.

His archived papers are located at the University of Kansas.

== Works ==
- R. A. Eubanks residence (1964), 1436 North Madison Avenue, Wichita, Kansas
- Jackson Mortuary (1965), 600 North Main Street, Wichita, Kansas
- McAdams Park pool (1969), Wichita, Kansas
- McKnight Art Center (1970), Wichita State University, Wichita, Kansas
- Edwin A. Ulrich Museum (1974), Wichita State University, Wichita, Kansas
- Midtown station (MARTA) (1982), Atlanta, Georgia
- 1996 Olympic Games (1996), Atlanta, Georgia
- McAdams Park concession stand and restrooms (2016), Wichita, Kansas
- Oklahoma City School District 89 renovation, Oklahoma City, Oklahoma
- Calvary Baptist Church, Wichita, Kansas

== See also ==
- African-American architects
- McKissack & McKissack
