= Wendell Jerome Campbell =

American architect

Wendell Campbell (April 27, 1927 – July 9, 2008) was an African American architect who studied under Mies Van Der Rohe and Ludwig Hilberseimer while attending the Illinois Institute of Technology. Campbell graduated in 1957 with a Bachelor of Arts in Architecture and City Planning, and after difficulty in finding work due to racial prejudice he founded his own firm in 1966. Campbell is noted for his contributions to several building projects throughout Chicago and Gary, Indiana as well as his redevelopment plans for major US cities. In 1971 Campbell co-founded and served as the first president of the National Organization of Minority Architects. In 1976 he was awarded the prestigious Whitney Young Medal of Honor by the American Institute of Architects (AIA) and designated as a fellow of the AIA in 1979.

== Early life ==
Wendell Campbell was born on April 27, 1927, in East Chicago, Indiana and grew up as one of six children in the household. Growing up as the son of a carpenter, who was the first black general contractor in Chicago, Campbell often assisted his father with projects helping to gain carpentry skills from early in his life. Campbell graduated high school in 1945 as a National Honor Society Recipient. After graduation he was drafted to serve in Japan during World War II, where he was a part of a combat engineer regiment that designed bridges and roads. After fourteen months of service, Campbell was honorably discharged and returned to the United States to study architecture. After being offered a full-tuition scholarship from Commonwealth Edison, in 1957 Campbell graduated from the Illinois Institute of Technology with a BA in Architecture and City Planning. While attending IIT Campbell had the opportunity to study under both Mies Van Der Rohe and Ludwig Hilberseimer from whom he says he learned the ability of learning how to think and solve problems through to a reasonable solution which helped to influence many of his projects.

== Career ==
After graduation Campbell secured a job at the Purdue Calumet Development Foundation, where he worked for ten years on various urban renewal projects in the region. He launched his own firm, Wendell Campbell Associates in 1966, and renamed it several times during his practicing career. The name changed to Campbell and Macsai in 1970 until 1975 while Campbell and architect John Macsai were partners. It then to Campbell Tiu Campbell in 1976 to recognize the contributions of his daughter Susan and professional partner Domingo Tiu.

Shortly after graduating, and while still employed at the Development Foundation, in 1971 Campbell co-founded and served as the first president of the National Organization of Minority Architects. For his contributions to address racial inequity within the architecture field he was awarded the Whitney M. Young Jr. Award by the AIA.

In 1981 Campbell was commissioned to design and build the Genesis Convention Center in Gary, Indiana. According to the Crusader Newspaper Group the convention center was used as a symbol to represent Black achievement in a new era of Gary's history. The center was in operation for 35 years and housed the Gary Steelheads basketball team and the Continental Basketball Association.

Campbell is associated with many major Chicago landmarks throughout his practicing career. Campbell was a contributor to the additional expansion efforts of McCormick Place during the construction of the North Building in 1986.

Campbell contributed to the initial remodeling of the DuSable Museum of African American History. He later returned and designed the Harold Washington Wing, which opened to the public in 1993.

In 1997 Campbell designed the Trinity United Church of Christ, which serves one the largest Black congregations of Chicago with more than 8,500 members.

Beginning in 1999, Campbell Tiu Campbell were contracted to work on the interior and exterior remodeling of the Chicago Military Academy in Bronzeville. The new school was to be located within the Eighth Regiment Armory building, which is a historic landmark that was built in 1915 to be used to house the all-black 8th Infantry Battalion. In 2000, the National Trust for Historic Preservation recognized the restoration and conversion of the Armory with a National Preservation Honor Award.

Campbell also designed a few residential homes, one of these homes, constructed in 1962 is located within the Chatham neighborhood of Chicago. His other residential projects include two high-rise buildings with then partner John Macsai: 1240 N. Lake Shore Drive and The WaterFord Condominiums (4170 N. Marine Drive) constructed in 1973.

According to his webpage on the NOMA website, Campbell is also credited with restoration of the Michigan Avenue Draw Bridge and the Metcalf Federal Building and redevelopment plans for major cities like New Orleans, Las Vegas, Chicago and Milwaukee.

== Personal life ==
Campbell continued his dedication to racial equity and creating greater educational and economic opportunities by being serving on the boards of: Mercy Hospital and Medical Center, AIA Chicago, the Chicago Architectural Assistance Center, the Black Ensemble Theatre, the South Side YMCA and NOMA.

In 1954 Campbell married June Crusor Campbell with whom he had two daughters Susan Campbell-Smith and Leslie Campbell, the former being a partner in his firm Campbell Tiu Campbell.
