= Kimberly Dowdell =

American architect

- Born: Detroit, Michigan, U.S.
- Education: Cornell University (BA), Harvard University (MPA)
- Occupation: Architect
- Website: https://www.kimberlydowdell.com

Kimberly Nicole Dowdell, AIA, is an American architect, real estate developer, and educator. She is originally from Detroit, Michigan, and is a Chicago-based. Dowdell is currently a principal at HOK's Chicago office, and she served as the 2019-2020 national president of the National Organization of Minority Architects (NOMA). On June 15, 2022, Dowdell was elected as first vice-president and president-elect of the American Institute of Architects. She was the 100th president of the American Institute of Architects and the first Black woman to serve in the role.

== Early life and education ==
Dowdell grew up in Detroit. Dowdell received a Bachelor of Architecture from Cornell University in 2006 and her Master in Public Administration from Harvard University in 2015.

== Career ==
When at Cornell in 2005, Dowdell co-founded the Social Economic Environmental Design (SEED) Network. After Cornell, Dowdell worked at HOK's New York office in 2008 before transitioning to focus on real estate in 2011.

After graduating from Harvard University in 2015, Dowdell worked for Detroit's Housing and Revitalization Department and in 2016 transitioned to working with Century Partners on equitable revitalization of the city's vacant lots. Between 2016 and 2019, Dowdell taught architecture and urban planning at the University of Michigan.

As a principal at HOK, Dowdell launched the HOK IMPACT program and co-chairs the Diversity Advisory across all of HOK's global offices.

== Awards and honors ==
- Elected to Cornell University Board of Trustees, 2022
- AIA Young Architects Award, 2020
- Women in Architecture Design Leadership – Activist Award, 2020
- 19th Annual Dunlop Lecturer at the Harvard Graduate School of Design, 2019
- Next City Vanguard honoree for rising urban leaders, 2013
- Crain's Detroit Business "40 Under 40" honoree, 2005

== Notable speaking events ==
- Verdical Group's annual Net Zero Conference, 2024
- World Build Podcast: CSR, environmental stewardship, equity and inclusion, June 7, 2021
- TEDxDetroit : Home run Detroit November 2017
