= Roberta Washington =

American architect

- Education: Howard University; Columbia University
- Occupation: Architect
- Practice: Roberta Washington Architects

Roberta Washington FAIA, NOMA, is an American architect. She founded the firm Roberta Washington Architects in 1983, which, at the time, was one of very few architecture firms in the United States led by an African-American woman. She was a Commissioner of the New York City Landmarks Preservation Commission from 2007 to 2015. She is a past President of the National Organization of Minority Architects (1997) and is a Director and Treasurer of the National Organization of Minority Architects (NOMA) Foundation. She has been a Fellow of the American Institute of Architects since 2006.

== Early life and education ==
Washington received her Bachelor of Architecture degree in 1970 from Howard University. She completed a Master of Architecture degree at Columbia University in 1971. She received a full scholarship from Columbia University along with 25 other African-American students as a response to its campus riots in 1968. After earning her master's degree, she spent four years working on hospital and housing projects in Mozambique.

During her education, she was active in organizations including the Women's Caucus at the American Institute of Architects and Alliance of Women in Architecture. Forming bonds with fellow architects helped inspire Washington to work to ensure legacies of Blacks and women aren't lost. She has been researching and writing about architects Beverly Loraine Green and Georgia Louise Harris Brown since 1997.

Washington was elected to the board of directors of the Society of Architectural Historians in 2021. She is a member of the Board of Directors of Save Harlem Now. She served on Community Board 10 in Central Harlem where she was chair of the Housing Committee and co-chair of the Land Use Committee.
