= Pratt Institute School of Architecture =

Private architecture school in New York City, US

Coordinates: 40.69134°N 73.96369°W

- Type: Private architecture school
- Established: 1928
- Location: New York City, New York, United States
- Campus: Urban
- Website: pratt.edu/architecture

The Pratt Institute School of Architecture is the architecture school of the Pratt Institute, a private university in New York City. In 2020, the program was ranked among the ten best architecture schools in the United States.

Alumni include Pascale Sablan, William Van Alen, Ralph Appelbaum Associates, Annabelle Selldorf, Richard Foster, George Ranalli, Carlos Zapata, and Pritzker Prize winner Peter Zumthor. The School was created in 1928 and by 1954 was recognized as being full degree-granting Undergraduate and Graduate program. Undergraduate architecture is the largest program in both the School of Architecture and Pratt Institute at large with over 550 students. Within the Brooklyn campus, the school of architecture is located a block south of the main campus in Higgins Hall, 61 St James Place (designed by Steven Holl).

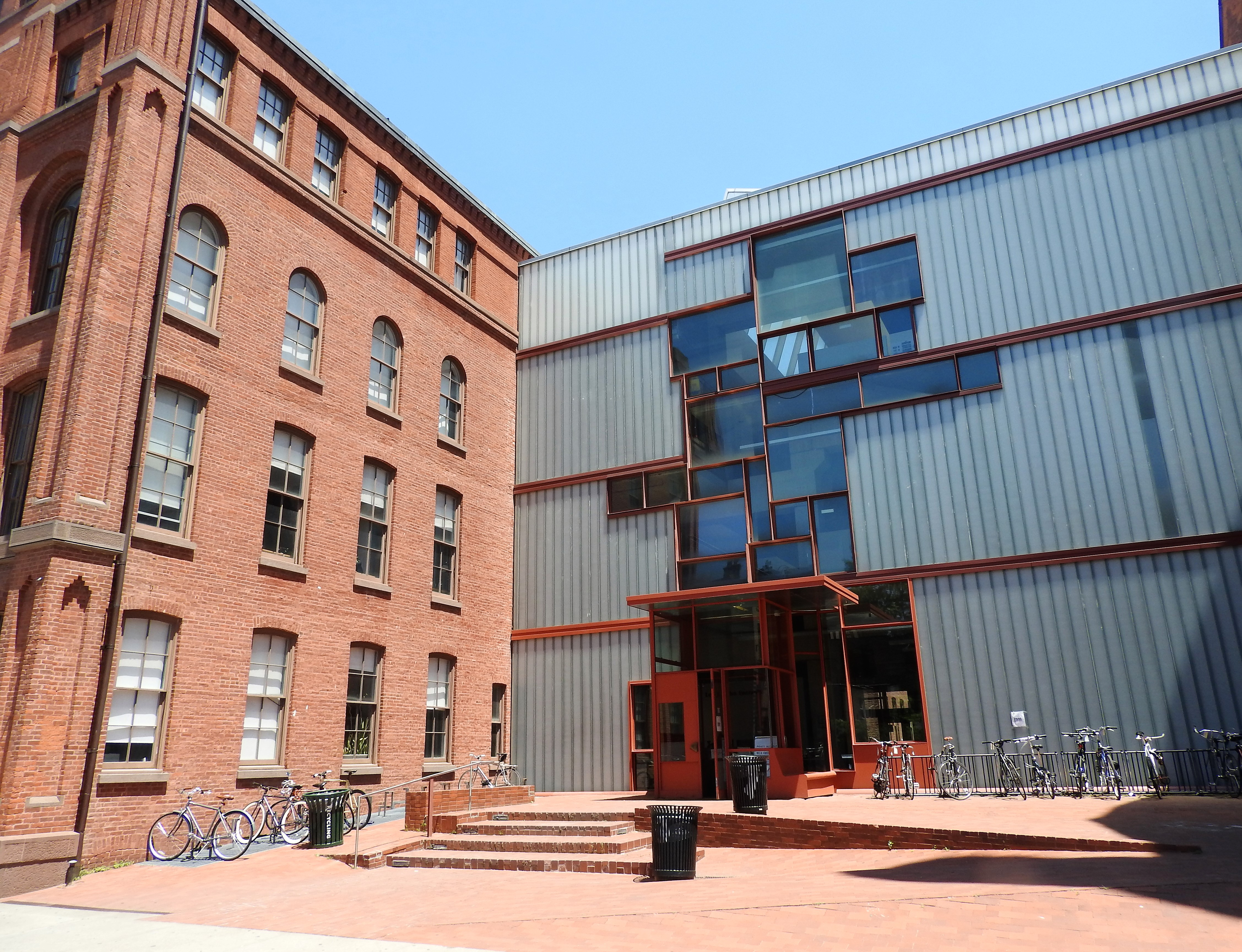
Higgins Hall

== Degrees and minors ==
The school offers the following degrees and minors:

Undergraduate

- Bachelor of Architecture (First-professional)
- Bachelor of Science in Construction Management (Manhattan Campus)
- Bachelor of Professional Studies in Construction Management (Manhattan Campus)
- Associate of Applied Science in Building and Construction (Manhattan Campus)

Undergraduate Minors:

- Minor in Construction Management
- Minor in Architectural Theory and Technology
- Minor in Morphology

Graduate

- Master of Architecture (First-professional)
- Master of Science in Architecture (Post-professional)
- Master of Science in Architecture and Urban Design (Post-professional)
- Master of Science in City and Regional Planning
- Master of Science in Urban Environmental Systems Management
- Master of Science in Historic Preservation (Manhattan Campus)
- Master of Science in Facilities Management (Manhattan Campus)
- Master of Science in Real Estate Practice (Manhattan Campus)

=== Alumni ===
- Joe Amisano (1917-2008)
- Ralph Appelbaum Associates
- Charles Belfoure
- Guy Bolton (1884-1979)
- Elizabeth Crowley
- Johannes Knoops (1962- )
- Henry F. Ludorf (1888-1968)
- Elisabeth Martini (1886-1984)
- Henry V. Murphy (1888-1960)
- J. Gerald Phelan (1893-1981)
- John M. Pierce (1886-1958)
- George Ranalli (1946- )
- Annabelle Selldorf
- William Van Alen
- Carlos Zapata
- Peter Zumthor

== Additional resources ==
- American Institute of Architecture Students Chapter
- Berlin and China Summer Program
- Undergraduate Rome Program, sharing studio space with the University of Waterloo, School of Architecture in Piazza de Santa Maria in Trastevere
- Yearly student work publication, in Process
