= Statue of Jackie Robinson (Wichita, Kansas) =

Sculpture in the United States

Coordinates: 37°42′43″N 97°19′21″W

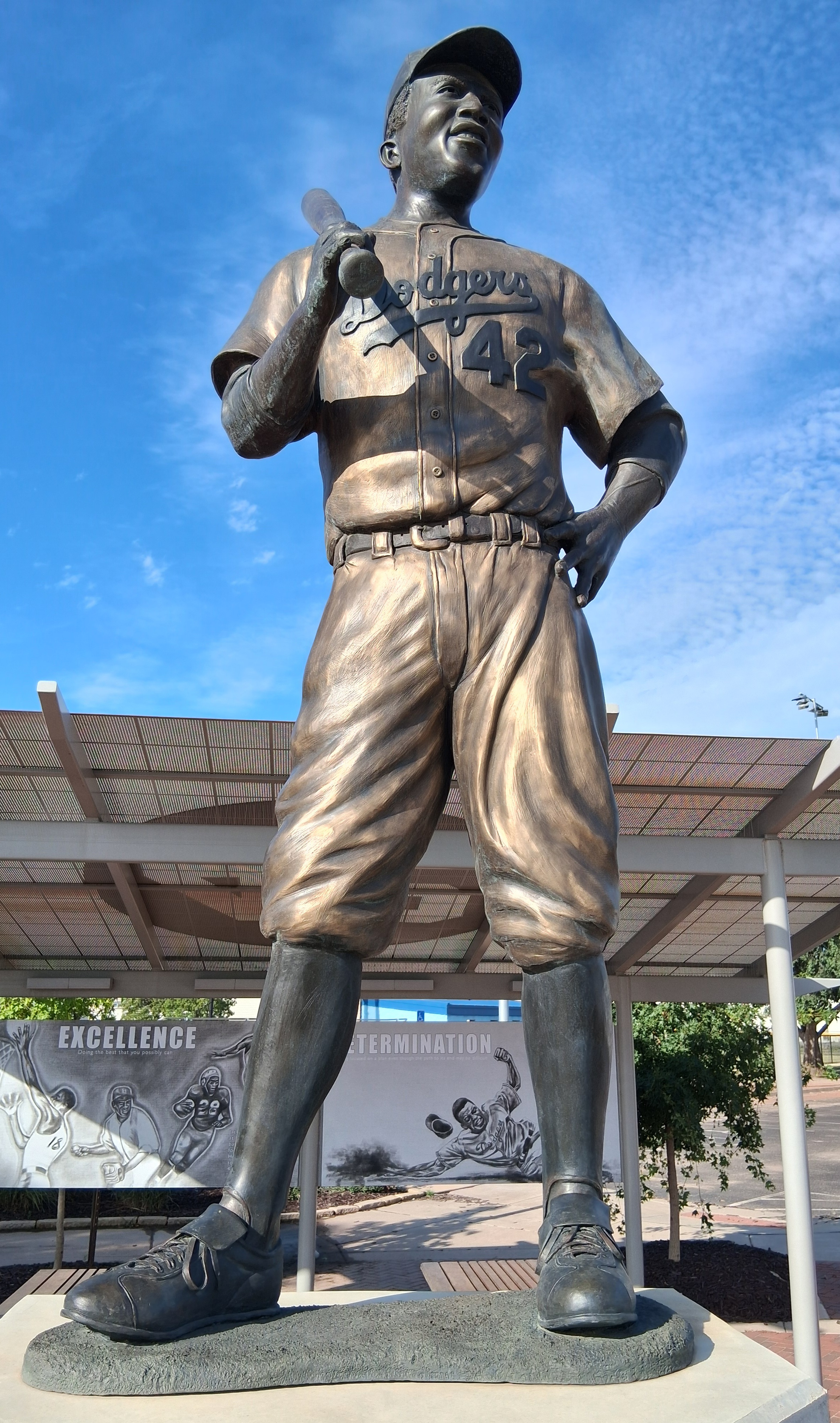
- The Statue of Jackie Robinson in 2026
- Artist: John Parsons
- Year: 2021
- Medium: Bronze sculpture
- Subject: Jackie Robinson
- Location: McAdams Park Wichita, Kansas, U.S.
- Website: league42.org

In 2021, a bronze statue of Jackie Robinson, created by John Parsons, was installed in Wichita, Kansas, by League 42, a youth baseball league, in McAdams Park. In January 2024, the statue was stolen, cut off from its ankles by a group of vandals. It was found dismantled and burnt a few days later. A recast statue was unveiled on August 5, 2024.

== Background ==
League 42, a non-profit organization which promotes youth baseball for children in Wichita and was named after Jackie Robinson's jersey number, raised $50,000 for a life-sized statue of Robinson in McAdams Park where their baseball field was located. The statue was dedicated in 2021 in honor of Robinson, the first African-American player to break the color line in Major League Baseball.

Robinson first played professional baseball for the Kansas City Monarchs of the Negro leagues, who played in Kansas City, Kansas, prior to his historic signing with the Brooklyn Dodgers.

== Theft and destruction ==
The statue vandalized

According to the Wichita police, the statue went missing during the morning hours of January 25, 2024. The statue was cut from its ankles, with only the statue's base and Robinson's cleats remaining. Surveillance video, released the following day, showed multiple people hauling the sculpture away in the dark.

Joe Sullivan, the chief of police in Wichita stated in a press conference:

I'm frustrated by the actions of those individuals who had the audacity to take the statue of Jackie Robinson from a park where kids and families in our community gather to learn the history of Jackie Robinson, an American icon, and play the game of baseball. This should upset all of us.

Five days after the statue was stolen, its remains were found burning in a trash can. Bob Lutz, head of League 42, said afterwards that they would try to either salvage the statue or replace it with a new one.

A week after the theft occurred, on what would have been Robinson's 105th birthday, all 30 Major League Baseball teams announced that they would help replace the vandalized statue; the artwork would be recast using the initial mold with completion planned for summer 2024. MLB also announced they would provide funding for League 42's youth baseball program, to help it achieve its academic and on-field goals.

On February 12, 2024, police arrested 45-year-old Ricky Alderete in connection with the theft. They said there was no evidence it was a "hate-motivated crime" and that intent was to sell the metal, which was 95% copper, for scrap. The police chief said it was "only the first arrest".

The following month, it was announced that the bronze cleats left behind by the vandals would to be donated to the Negro Leagues Baseball Museum.

In May 2024, Alderete pleaded guilty to theft and other charges. On August 1, 2024, he was sentenced to 15 years in prison.

A recast statue was unveiled on August 5, 2024.
