= John S. Chase =

American architect (1925–2012)

John Saunders Chase Jr.
- Born: January 23, 1925; Annapolis, Maryland
- Died: March 29, 2012 (aged 87)
- Education: Hampton University; University of Texas at Austin School of Architecture
- Occupation: Architect

John Saunders Chase Jr. (January 23, 1925 – March 29, 2012) was an American architect who was the first licensed African American architect in the state of Texas. He was also the only Black architect licensed in the state for almost a decade. He was also the first African American to serve on the U.S. Commission of Fine Arts, which reviewed the design for the United States Vietnam Veterans Memorial. He was born in Annapolis, Maryland, to John Saunders Chase and Alice Viola Hall.

== Education and career ==
Chase attended Hampton University as an undergrad, graduating in 1948. On June 7, 1950, Chase enrolled in the University of Texas School of Architecture master's program, making the university the first in the South to enroll an African American. Upon graduation, no white firm would hire him, so Chase moved to Houston, Texas to teach at Texas Southern University and to start his own firm, which he owned and operated for over 50 years. Although he had been designing buildings since the late 1940s, Chase started officially practicing architecture in 1952. In 1963, he designed Riverside National Bank, the first black-owned bank in Texas. In 1971, he and 12 other architects founded the National Organization of Minority Architects (NOMA).

== Awards ==
Over the course of his career, Chase received numerous accolades for his professional and civic achievements.

- Hampton Outstanding Alumnus at Large (1961)
- Houston Citizens' Chamber of Commerce Business Achievement Award (1967)
- Omega Psi Phi fraternity, Inc. Man of the Year (1968)
- Service to Humanity Award (1972)
- Houston Association of General and SubContractors Award (1974)
- Black Entrepreneur Award from National Association of Black Accountants (1977)
- Central Intercollegiate Athletic Association (CIAA) Hall of Fame for Wrestling and Football (1977)
- AIA Whitney M. Young Jr. Citation for Significant Contributions to Social Responsibility (1982)
- NOMA Design for Excellence Award (1984-1987)
- University of Texas at Austin Distinguished Black Alumnus Award (1989)
- Texas Ex-Students Association Distinguished Alumnus Award (1992)
- Commendation for Meritorious Service Houston ISD
- Honor Award for Architectural Excellence in School Design, Texas Association of School Boards (for Booker T. Washington High School)
- City of Annapolis Outstanding Contributions in the Field of Architecture
- Fleet Owners Golden 100 Award
- Texas Society of Architects Honor Award

In 2025, the University of Texas at Austin named its architecture library the John S. Chase Architecture and Planning Library.

== Selected works ==
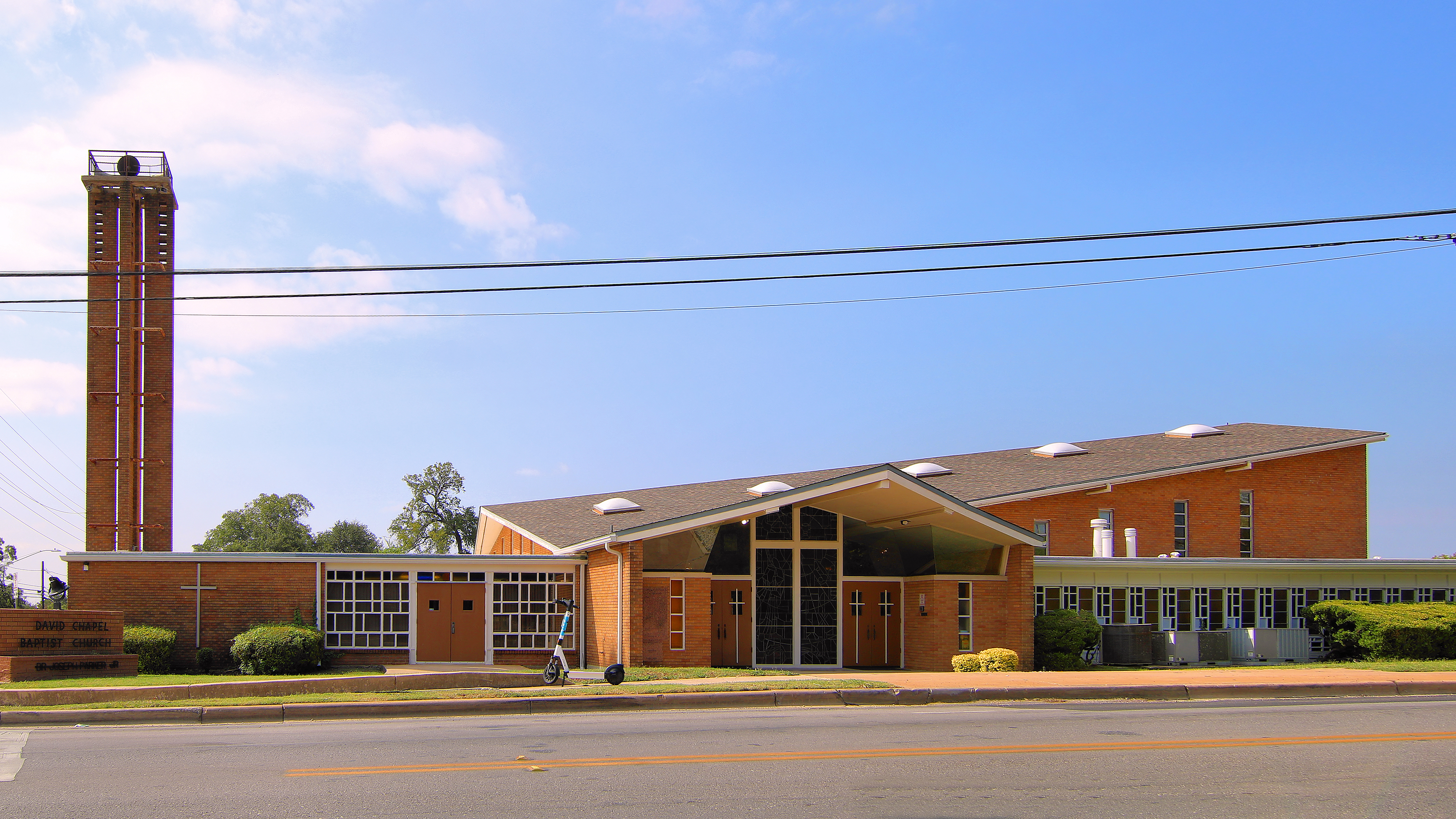
David Chapel Missionary Baptist Church

- Deluxe Hotel, Austin, 1949-1953
- Colored Teachers State Association of Texas Headquarters, Austin, 1952
- Greater Mt. Zion Baptist Church, Houston, 1955 (with David C. Baer)
- David Chapel Missionary Baptist Church, Austin, 1959
- Chase Residence, Houston, 1959
- Olivet Baptist Church, Austin, 1961
- Irene Thompson House, Austin, 1963
- Riverside National Bank, Houston, 1963
- Della Philips House, Austin, 1966
- Martin Luther King Jr. Humanities Building at Texas Southern University, Houston, 1969
- Greater Barbours Chapel Missionary Baptist Church, Texas City, 1971
- Washington Technical Institute, Washington, DC, 1972, 1976-1979
- Atlanta Life Building, Atlanta, 1974-1975
- Ernest S. Sterling Student Life Center at Texas Southern University, Houston, 1976
- Thurgood Marshall School of Law at Texas Southern University, Houston, 1976
- Booker T. Washington High School, Houston, 1984-1986 (with Morris Architects)
- Links, Inc., National Headquarters, Washington, DC, 1985
- George R. Brown Convention Center (Banquet Halls and Grand Ballroom, with Golemon & Rolfe Associates, Molina & Associates, Haywood Jordan McGowan, Moseley Associations, and 3D/International)), Houston, 1988
- Harris County Astrodome Remodeling and Expansion Project (with CRS Sirrine, Wilson/Griffin, and Haywood Jordan McCowan), 1989/1990
- Delta Sigma Theta sorority national headquarters, Washington DC, 1990
- School of Law & Government Studies, Townview Center Magnet High School, Dallas, 1991-1995
- U.S. Embassy, Tunis, Tunisia, 1992-1995 (never built)
- San Antonio Garage, University of Texas at Austin, 1993-1994 (with Morris Architects)
- Mike A. Myers Track and Soccer Stadium, University of Texas at Austin, 1999-2000
- Toyota Center (associate architect with HOK Sport and Morris Architects), Houston, 2003
