= Paul S. Devrouax =

American architect

- Born: October 4, 1942; New Orleans, Louisiana, U.S.
- Died: March 22, 2010 (aged 67); Washington, D.C., U.S.
- Occupation: Architect
- Practice: Devrouax+Purnell
- Buildings: PEPCO Headquarters; Washington Convention Center; Nationals Park
- Projects: African American Civil War Memorial

Paul S. Devrouax (October 4, 1942—March 22, 2010), was an American architect. He founded the architectural design firm of Devrouax+Purnell, in Washington, D.C.

He helped design the Verizon Center, Nationals Park, the Walter E. Washington Convention Center, and the D.C. headquarters of Freddie Mac and Pepco. He co-designed the African-American Civil War Memorial, and provided design adjustments to the Martin Luther King, Jr. Memorial.

== Early life and education ==
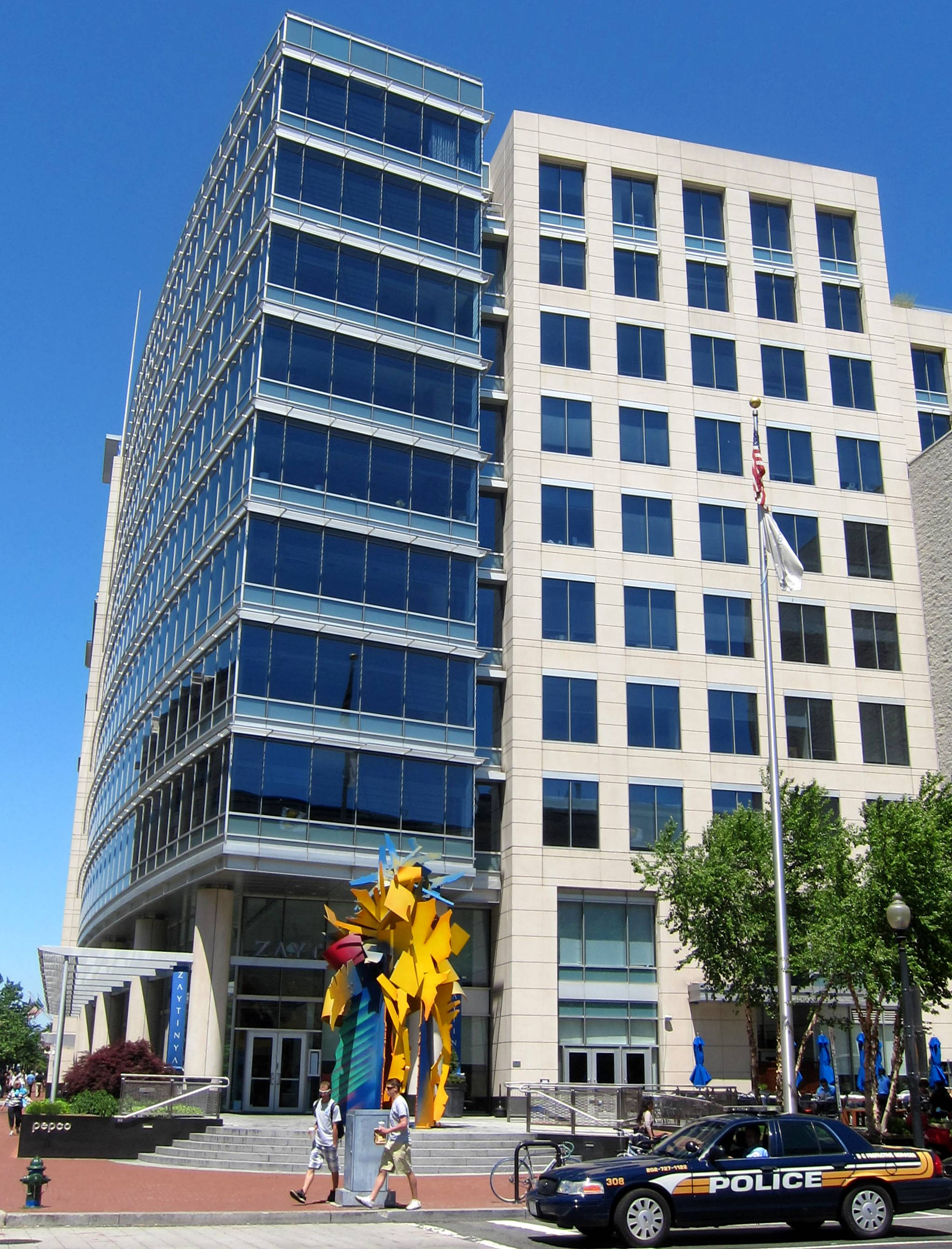
Devrouax co-designed the Pepco headquarters.

He was born in October 1942 to in New Orleans, Louisiana, to Paul Devrouax, Sr. and Freddie Warner Devrouax. He had two brothers, Edward and Charles, and was raised in New Orleans and Los Angeles, California. He graduated in 1966 with a degree in architecture from Southern University in Baton Rouge, Louisiana.

Devrouax was drafted into the United States Army, and was promoted to the position of sergeant in the 6th Armored Cavalry Regiment. In 1968, he was stationed at Fort Meade in Maryland. On April 5, 1968, his unit was deployed in D.C. to restore order in the wake of the Martin Luther King, Jr. assassination riots.

Devrouax married Brenda Stallworth on September 9, 1972. The couple had a daughter, Lesley.

== Career ==
With African American architect Marshall E. Purnell, he founded Devrouax+Purnell Architects and Planners, PC, in 1978. He was elected president of the National Organization of Minority Architects in 1980, and the Washington Project for the Arts in 1988.

In 1986, Devrouax designed the Frank D. Reeves Municipal Building for the D.C. city government, a structure which helped revitalized the U Street NW historic neighborhood. He designed the renovation of the Reverend Jesse Jackson's apartment home at the Rittenhouse Building in LeDroit Park in Washington, D.C., in 1990. In 1995, Devrouax+Purnell won the design for one of Freddie Mac's headquarters building in McLean, Virginia. They were the first African American architects to design a headquarters for a Fortune 500 company. Five years later, Devrouax+Purnell became the first African American owned architectural firm to design a corporate headquarters in downtown Washington, D.C., when they won the design competition for the new Pepco building.

Devrouax also helped design the Verizon Center (home of the Washington Wizards professional basketball team and the Washington Capitals professional ice hockey team), which was finished in 1997, and Nationals Park (home of the Washington Nationals professional baseball team), which was completed in 2008. He also helped lead the design team for the Walter E. Washington Convention Center, which opened in 2003.

In 2009, Devrouax+Purnell's design was one of six chosen as finalists for the National Museum of African American History and Culture.

=== Death ===
Devrouax died of a heart attack at his home in Washington, D.C., on March 22, 2010.

== Memorial work ==
Devrouax also worked on several important national monuments. He and landscape architect Edward D. Dunson designed the site for the African-American Civil War Memorial in 1998.

In 2004, Devrouax helped build the Martin Luther King, Jr. Memorial in Washington, D.C.. He and members of his firm made design refinements to the memorial, made presentations to federal and city agencies with design approval over the memorial, and helped develop, monitor, and approve construction documents.
