= Pascale Sablan =

American architect

Pascale Sablan FAIA NOMAC
- Born: Pascale Saint-Louis; March 27, 1983 (age 43); Queens, New York, U.S.
- Education: Columbia University; Pratt Institute School of Architecture
- Occupation: Architect
- Practice: Adjaye Associates; S9 Architecture; FXFOWLE

Pascale Sablan (born 1983) is an American architect and designer. She is the CEO at Adjaye Associates, New York Studio and became a Fellow of the American Institute of Architects in 2021. Sablan advocates on behalf of women and BIPOC people in architecture as the founder and executive director of Beyond the Built Environment. She previously worked for FXFOWLE (now FXCollaborative) and S9 Architecture.

Sablan has served as the historian and president of the National Organization of Minority Architects. In 2024 Sablan was inducted into the NOMA Council, one of the highest honors to reach in the organization. She received the Whitney M. Young Jr. Award from the American Institute of Architects in 2021. Projects that she has contributed to include the Ancestral Chamber of the African Burial Ground National Monument, schools in Haiti, and the Bronx Point Project which includes the Universal Hip Hop Museum. She earned architectural degrees from Columbia University and the Pratt Institute School of Architecture.

In early 2025 Pascale published GREATNESS: Diverse Designers of architecture book with Oro Editions.

== Early life and education ==
Pascale Saint-Louis was born in 1983 in Queens, the second oldest of 10 children. She is part of the Haitian diaspora and speaks Haitian Creole. While painting a mural for a community center in Pomonok, Queens, when she was 11, she was told she would make a good architect. She graduated from The Mary Louis Academy in 2001.

She earned her Bachelor of Architecture degree from the Pratt Institute School of Architecture in 2006. While she was a student at Pratt, she interned with Aarris Architects, working on a project for the Ancestral Chamber of the African Burial Ground National Monument in New York. She earned her master's in architectural design from Columbia University's Graduate School of Architecture, Planning and Preservation in 2007.

== Architectural career ==
Following her graduation in 2007, Sablan worked as an architect for FXFOWLE (now FXCollaborative) for 10 years as a member of its international studio. In 2014, she was licensed as an architect and promoted to associate at the firm after working for 13 years. She was the 315th living Black woman to be licensed in architecture in the United States. While at FXFOWLE, she worked on design for the Museum of the Built Environment in Riyadh, Saudi Arabia. She was a senior associate at S9 Architecture from 2017 to 2021. Sablan was hired as a senior associate at Adjaye Associates in 2021. In January 2023, Sablan was promoted to associate principal at Adjaye Associates New York studio. She has worked on residential, mixed-use, and commercial projects in Azerbaijan, India, the United Arab Emirates, and Japan.

Sablan has been involved with the ACE Mentorship Program since 2012. She worked alongside students to design a school campus for the Association of Haitian Physicians Abroad in Cap-Haïtien, Haiti, following the earthquake in 2010. Among Sablan's projects was the 540-unit residential Bronx Point Project which includes the Universal Hip Hop Museum and a community facility.

Sablan advocates on behalf of women and BIPOC people in architecture. She is the founder and executive director of the platform Beyond the Built Environment, which originated in 2017. It is dedicated to promoting people of color and women within the field of architecture. The group's 2017 exhibition SAY IT LOUD highlighted work by members of the National Organization of Minority Architects (NOMA). By 2022, the group had staged 34 exhibitions around the world. She served as historian of NOMA and became president of the organization in 2021, the fifth woman to ever hold the position. In 2020, Sablan started the Great Diverse Designers Library, a directory of women and people of color in design and architecture.

Sablan is a former president of the New York Coalition of Black Architects and has been on the board of trustees of The Mary Louis Academy. She is on the board of directors of AIA New York and gives lectures at universities. In 2021, Sablan became the youngest AIA College of Fellows inductee at age 38.

== Awards ==
In 2014, Sablan won the Emerging Professional Award from AIA New York/Center for Architecture. She was named member of the year of the National Organization of Minority Architects in 2015. In 2018, she won the Young Architects award of the American Institute of Architects. She became a Fellow of the American Institute of Architects in 2021. She received the Whitney M. Young Jr. Award from the American Institute of Architects in 2021. She received the Architectural League's 2021 Emerging Voices award. She won three Anthem Awards of the Webby Awards program in 2022.
