= James C. Dodd =

American architect (1923–1999)

James Charles Dodd Sr.
- Born: January 17, 1923; Texarkana, Texas, United States
- Died: February 3, 1999 (aged 76); Sacramento, California, United States
- Education: University of California, Berkeley
- Occupations: Architect, businessperson
- Years active: 1952–1996
- Known for: First licensed African American architect in Sacramento; founding member of NOMA
- Awards: Fellow of the American Institute of Architects (1981)

James Charles Dodd Sr., FAIA (1923–1999), was an American modernist architect and businessperson. He was the first licensed African American architect in the city of Sacramento, California. His architectural firm was James C. Dodd and Associates. Dodd was a founding member of the National Organization of Minority Architects (NOMA).

== Early life and education ==
James C. Dodd was born on January 17, 1923, in Texarkana, Texas, into an African American family. He served in the United States Army as a lieutenant during World War II.

Dodd used his G.I. Bill after the war, and attended the University of California, Berkeley where he studied architecture. He graduated from UC Berkeley in 1952 with a B.A. degree in architecture.

== Career ==
After graduation he worked as a draftsman for the State of California. In 1952, the Dodd family moved to Sacramento. From 1952 to 1955, Dodd worked for the firm of Barovetto & Thomas (Silvio Louis Barovetto, and Albert B. Thomas).

From 1956 to 1996, Dodd operated his own firm, the James C. Dodd and Associates architectural office was located at 2710 X Street in Sacramento. Notable building by James C. Dodd and Associates include Del Paso Heights Schools, McClellan Air Force Base remodels, Saint Hope Academy, Netta Sparks Women’s Civic Improvement Club, the Edna Wright House, the Hill House, and the James Jones’ House. The Nathaniel Colley Building (1967) at 1810 S Street in Sacramento, was designed by Dodd. Nathaniel Colley was the first Black lawyer in the city and a civil right leader; and the building was considered for listing on the Sacramento Register of Historic and Cultural Resources.

In 1970, Dodd was a founding member and a president of National Organization of Minority Architects (NOMA).

Elbert Mitchell was Dodd's business partner and they shared ownership in an apartment complex in Sacramento, which they built together. Dodd had several other business ventures; including the creation of the Urfab System, a prefabricated housing material panel, made from recycled product. Urfab was approved in 1976 by the California Department of Housing and Community Development.

In 1981, he was elected to as a Fellow of the American Institute of Architects.

Dodd died on February 3, 1999, in Sacramento.

== List of notable work ==
- 1961, Dodd’s Residence, 1860 60th Avenue, Sacramento, California
- 1963, Shiloh Baptist Church, 3565 9th Avenue, Sacramento, California; NRHP-listed
- 1963, 6390 South Land Park Drive, Sacramento, California
- 1967, Nathaniel Colley Building, 1810 S Street, Sacramento, California

== See also ==
- African-American architects
- National Register of Historic Places listings in Sacramento County, California
