= Statue of Walter Johnson =

Sculpture at Nationals Park in Washington, D.C., U.S.

- Artist: Omri Amrany; Julie Rotblatt-Amrany
- Year: 2009
- Medium: Bronze
- Subject: Walter Johnson
- Location: Nationals Park; Washington, D.C., U.S.; 38°52′26.5″N 77°0′27.1″W

In 2009, a bronze statue of Walter Johnson, created by sculptor Omri Amrany, was installed outside Nationals Park, in Washington, D.C. One of the greatest pitchers in baseball history, Johnson played his entire career for the original Washington Senators.
