= Nationals Park =

Baseball stadium in Washington, D.C.

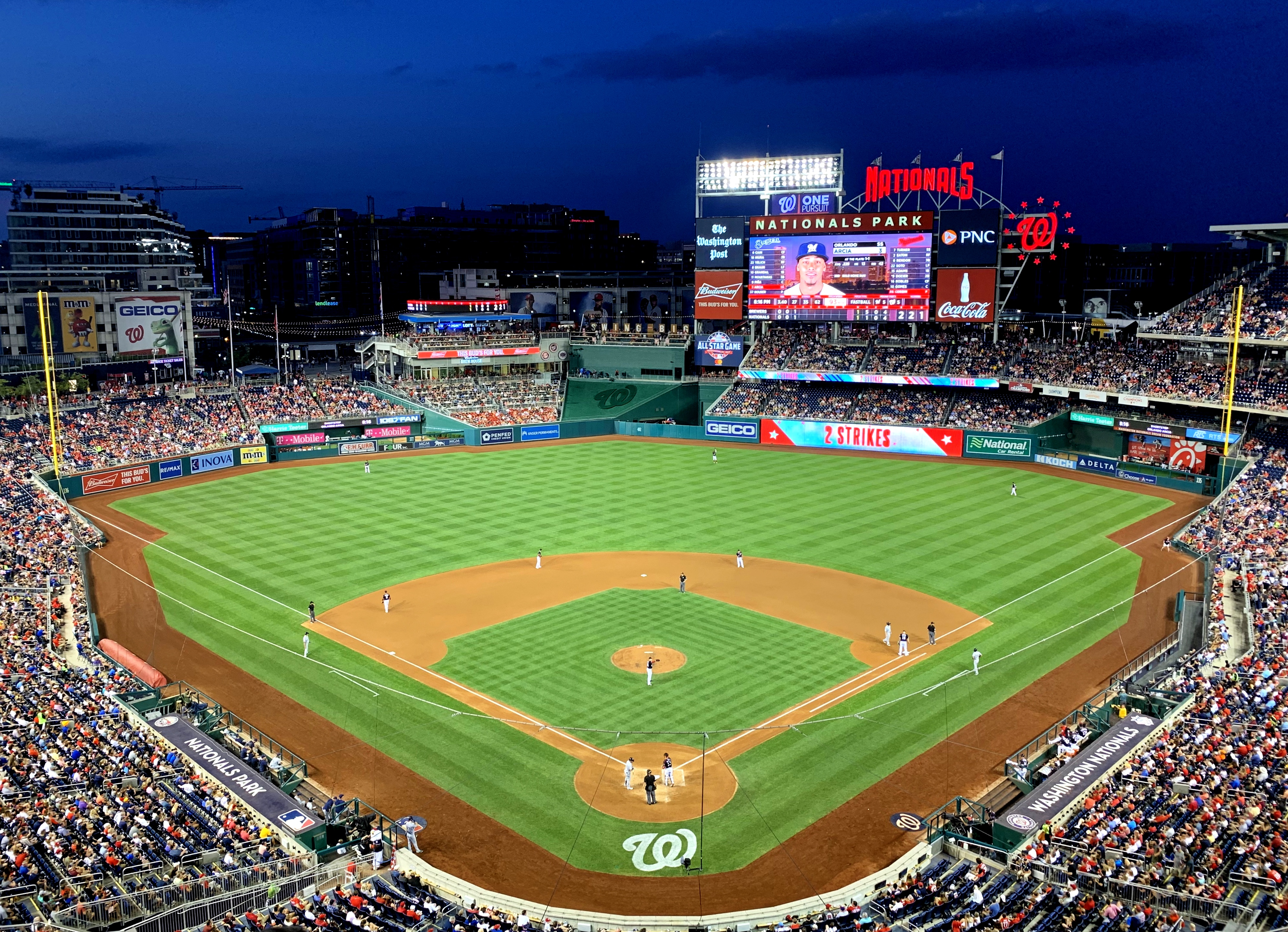
- Nationals Park in August 2019

- Location in Washington, D.C. Location in the United States
- Address: 1500 South Capitol Street SE
- Location: Washington, D.C., U.S.
- Coordinates: 38°52′22″N 77°0′27″W
- Owner: District of Columbia (Events DC)
- Operator: Washington Nationals
- Capacity: 41,373
- Surface: Kentucky bluegrass
- Record attendance: 45,966 (October 12, 2012 vs. Cardinals)
- Field size: Left Field - 337 feet (103 m); Left-Center - 377 feet (115 m); Center Field - 402 feet (123 m); Right-Center - 370 feet (113 m); Right Field - 335 feet (102 m)
- Public transit: Washington Metro: at Navy Yard–Ballpark; and Washington Metro Bus C51 and C55
- Parking: 14 sanctioned parking lots or garages

Construction
- Groundbreaking: May 4, 2006
- Opened: March 22, 2008
- Cost: US$693 million ($1.04 billion in 2025 dollars)
- Architects: HOK Sport; Paul S. Devrouax
- Project managers: Turner; Brailsford & Dunlavey; McKissack & McKissack
- Structural engineers: ReStl; Thornton Tomasetti
- Services engineers: M-E Engineers; JVP Engineers; SIM-G Technologies
- General contractor: Clark/Hunt/Smoot Joint Venture

Tenant
- Washington Nationals (MLB) (2008–present)

Website
- mlb.com/nationals/ballpark

Nationals Park is a baseball stadium along the Anacostia River in the Navy Yard neighborhood of Washington, D.C. It is the ballpark of Major League Baseball's Washington Nationals. It was completed in 2008, and was the first LEED-certified green major professional sports stadium in the United States.

Designed by HOK Sport and Devrouax & Purnell Architects and Planners, the ballpark was initially expected to cost $670 million, with a later price tag of $693 million to build, financed almost entirely by D.C. This amount included $135 million in an upfront payment from taxpayer funds. The rest of the sum, about $535 million, was funded by municipal bonds, putting the city deeply into debt. An additional $84.2 million was spent on transportation, art, and infrastructure upgrades, bringing the total cost to $783.9 million. The stadium has a capacity of 41,373. The Washington Monument and the Capitol building are visible from the upper decks on the first base side of the field.

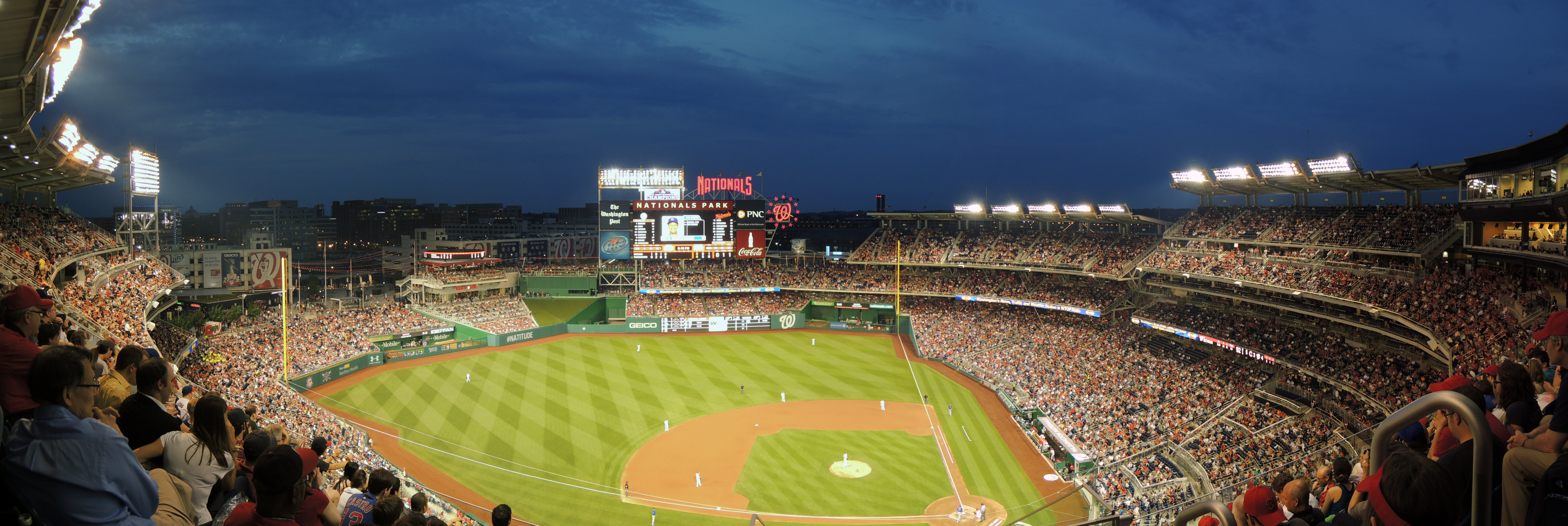
Nationals Park on May 10, 2013

Nationals Park hosted the 2018 Major League Baseball All-Star Game, the first All-Star Game to be played in Washington, D.C., since 1969. It hosted games 3, 4, and 5 of the 2019 World Series, the first in the federal district since 1933. It also hosted Banana Bowl I in October 2026.

== Location and transportation ==
Nationals Park is located in the Southeast quadrant of Washington, D.C., on South Capitol Street (a main artery separating Southeast from Southwest Washington) at the Anacostia River waterfront. The ballpark is accessible from Interstate 395 via the Southwest Freeway, and from Interstate 295 via the Frederick Douglass Memorial Bridge, which carries South Capitol Street across the Anacostia River. The Douglass Bridge was renovated so that South Capitol Street could continue at ground level past the stadium (it was previously 15 feet (4.6 m) above ground level).

The primary method of public transportation to the stadium is on the Washington Metro system. The stadium is one block from Navy Yard–Ballpark station on the Green Line. The station is located near the park's center field entrance and is heavily used by fans on game day. The station's southern entrance was expanded when the stadium was built, adding an escalator and elevator and moving the farecard mezzanine to street level.

Parking near the stadium is limited. There are 14 Nationals Park-sanctioned parking lots or garages, with a small number of third-party lots nearby. During the 2008 and 2009 seasons, the Nationals ran a free shuttle service (dubbed the "Nats Express") from parking lots at RFK Stadium to Nationals Park on game days.

Several Metrobus routes serve the park. Various other transit options include a water taxi service from Alexandria, Virginia, and Georgetown.

Cyclists are encouraged to ride to the stadium and are offered free valet bicycle parking. Garage C, located next to the ticket windows at the corner of 1st and N Street, houses a free bike valet service where fans are invited to store their bikes during the game. There are also 110 red bike racks on the sidewalks around the ballpark.

== History ==
=== Site selection and design ===
After it was announced that the Expos would leave Montreal, the government of Washington, D.C., began looking for a site for a baseball stadium to lure the team to Washington. After considering sites near RFK Stadium, in NoMA and straddling I-395 at Banneker Park, District officials announced on September 21, 2004, that they had chosen a site near the SE Anacostia waterfront.

=== Construction ===
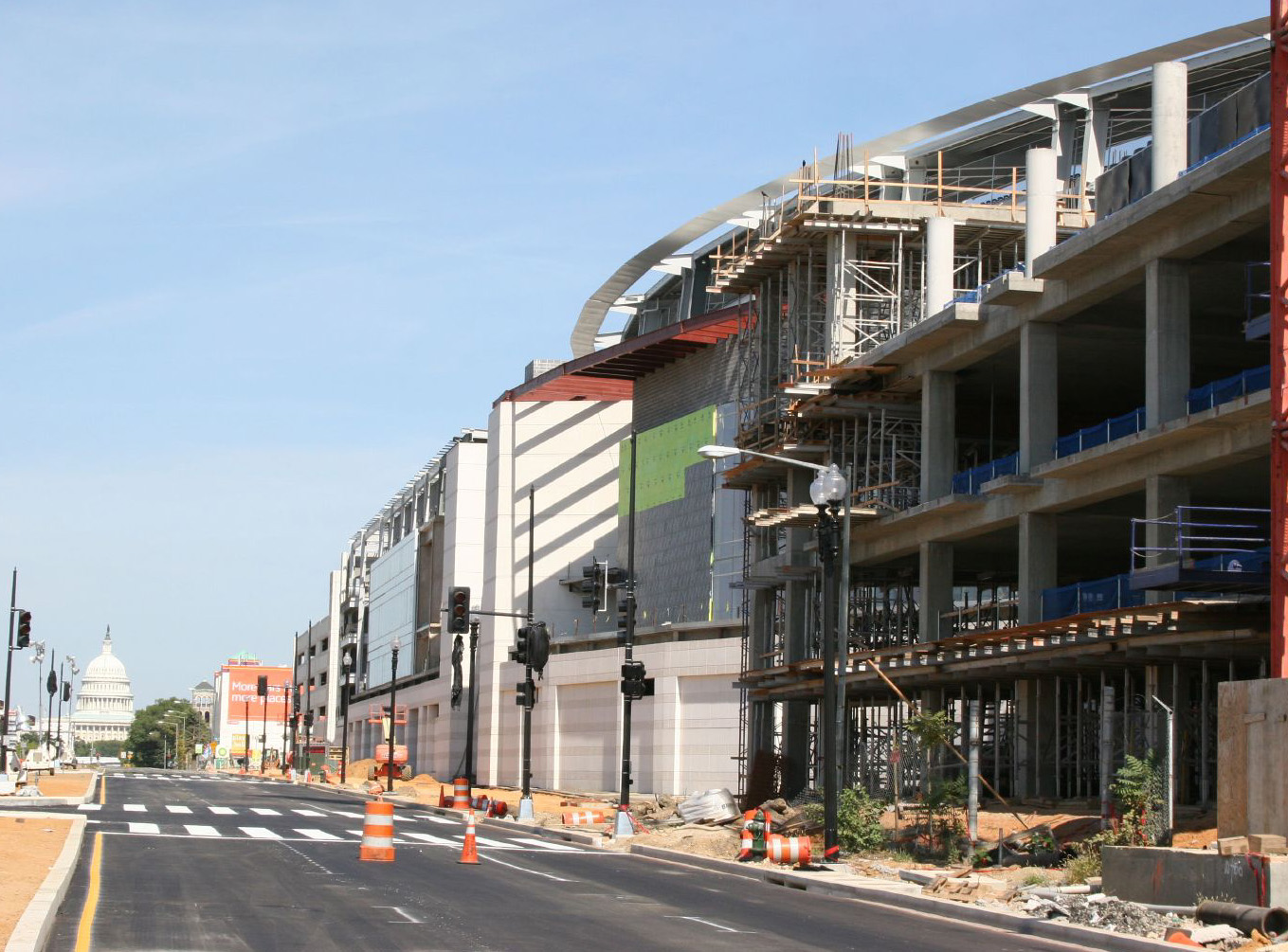
Nationals Park, under construction in September 2007, with the U.S. Capitol seen in the background

Financing for the stadium was expected to be provided by a banking syndicate led by Deutsche Bank. However, the finalization of the financing deal stalled due to complex negotiations among the city government, MLB as the owner of the team, and the bank. The bank requested a letter of credit or comparable financial guarantee against stadium rent to cover risks such as poor attendance or terrorism. The requested guarantee was $23 million, with the city requesting that MLB provide the guarantee. The financing situation was later solved, and construction began in May 2006.

The site of Nationals Park was chosen by Mayor Anthony Williams as the most viable of four possibilities for a ballpark. The ballpark's design was released to the public at a press conference on March 14, 2006. Groundbreaking was in early 2006. With an ambitious construction schedule of fewer than two years to complete the stadium, a design-build approach was selected to allow the architects and builders to work in concert with one another. Ronnie Strompf, the project superintendent, coordinated the efforts of numerous subcontractors daily.

=== Opening ===
The 2008 Washington Nationals season was the team's first in Nationals Park. George Washington University (GW) and the Nationals announced in February 2008 that the GW Colonials baseball team would play the first game in Nationals Park on March 22, 2008. GW played Saint Joseph's University in an afternoon game and the hometown Colonials had a 9–4 victory over Saint Joseph's.

The Washington Nationals defeated the Baltimore Orioles, 3–0, in an exhibition game on March 29, 2008, in their first game in the ballpark.

The Nationals opened the 2008 MLB season in Nationals Park with a rare one-game series against the Atlanta Braves on March 30, which served as the first official MLB game at the park. True to tradition, President George W. Bush threw out the ceremonial first pitch. The Nationals defeated the Braves, 3–2, with a walk-off home run from Ryan Zimmerman, giving the Nationals their first opening day win since moving to Washington. Chipper Jones of the Braves hit the first batted ball and first home run, while the Nationals' Cristian Guzman got the first base hit. According to the Elias Sports Bureau, Zimmerman's game-winning home run was the third walk-off home run in major-league history to be hit in the first MLB game played at a stadium. The game was the most-watched MLB opening night in the history of ESPN.

In their first season at Nationals Park, the Nationals finished with a league-worst record of 59–102. At home, they drew 29,005 fans per game, placing their average attendance at 19th in MLB.

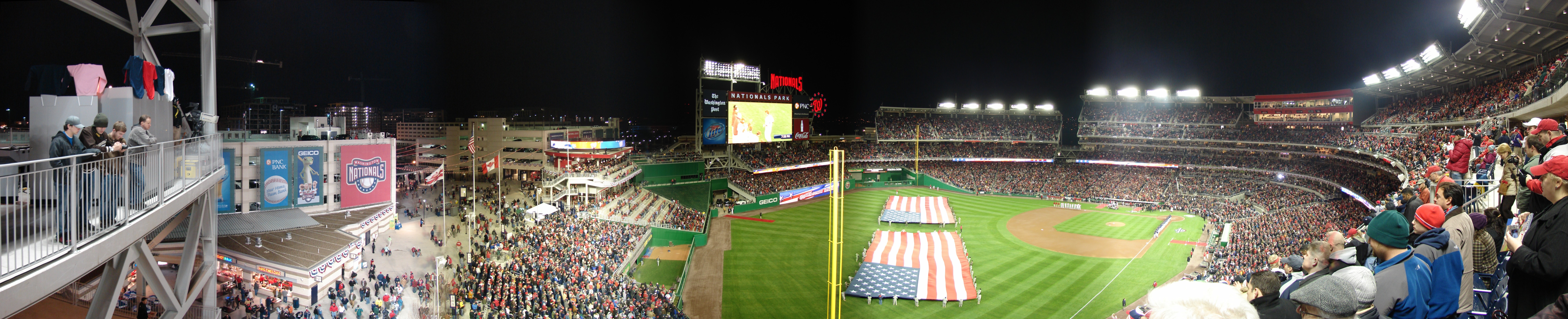
Opening Night, March 30, 2008

=== Seasons and changes ===
==== 2009 season ====
Several ballpark improvement projects were completed by the Nationals during the off-season, including:

- Expansion of the Red Porch restaurant in center field to include additional tables on both the concourse and field side. Glass windows on the concourse side were replaced with slidable garage doors, opening to a fenced outdoor patio. On the field side, the rear-most row of Center Field Lounge seats was removed, with an outdoor deck featuring tables and chairs installed in its place. New signage was added on the concourse side.
- Installation of three statues in the ballpark honoring Walter Johnson of the original Washington Senators, Frank Howard of the expansion Senators, and Josh Gibson of the Negro league Washington Homestead Grays, which played many of its games in Washington.
- A large Washington Nationals hat was added above the entrance to the team store near the center field plaza.
- New LED message boards were added over the roof of the Center Field Gate, providing information and instructions to fans entering the ballpark.
- New advertisement panels were attached to the face of the two garages in center field, with green panels being replaced by white panels. Additional panels showing the team's 2009 promotions and the current lineup were added to the western garage, facing the plaza.

Concessionaire Levy Restaurants replaced Centerplate as the provider of food and beverage at Nationals Park beginning with the 2009 season.

Before the Nationals 2009 home opener on April 13, 2009, at 3 pm, longtime Philadelphia Phillies announcer Harry Kalas was found unconscious in the Nationals Park press box at 12:20 pm. Kalas was rushed to George Washington University Hospital and pronounced dead at 1:20 pm. A moment of silence was held before the game, followed by both Nationals and Phillies fans applauding Kalas in tribute. The Phillies played with a picture of Kalas in their dugout.

On June 4, 2009, Randy Johnson became the 24th pitcher in MLB history to reach 300 wins when the San Francisco Giants beat the Nationals 5–1 at Nationals Park. The game was scheduled to be played the night before, but was delayed due to heavy rain in the DC-area. On July 4, 2009, Adam Dunn became the 123rd player to hit 300 career home runs. The home run came in the 7th inning in a 5–3 win versus the Atlanta Braves.

==== 2010 season ====
During the All-Star break, the press box was repainted blue to match the color of the seats. On June 8, 2010, pitcher Stephen Strasburg, called the "most hyped and closely watched pitching prospect in the history of baseball", made his first major league appearance, starting a game against the Pittsburgh Pirates before a sold-out crowd at Nationals Park. Strasburg pitched seven innings, giving up two runs and striking out 14 batters, a new team strikeout record.

==== 2011 season ====
Minor changes before the start of the 2011 season include removing the party tent on top of the LF parking garage to improve views of the U.S. Capitol from upper sections, chrome baseball decorations adorning the outside of the stadium, and various signage and concession changes including the departure of Five Guys. Nationals Park also became home of the D.C. Sports Hall of Fame. In June 2011 four new concession stands opened, owned by Danny Meyer's Union Square Hospitality Group: Blue Smoke (barbecue), Box Frites ("Belgian-style fries and dipping sauces"), El Verano Taqueria (Mexican) and Shake Shack (hamburgers, hot dogs, frozen custard). The team also ended Friday night firework shows and fireworks after home runs and team victories.

==== 2012 season ====
On May 4, for the series against Philadelphia, the Nationals renamed the park "Natitude Park". This was following their "Take Back the Park" plan, first selling advance tickets to fans in the Washington, D.C., area before opening up ticket sales to other states. This marked a shift from recent years where Phillies fans had flooded the park, as the crowd was predominantly Nationals fans and the team took two of three from their division rivals. On July 4, 2012 Nationals Park hosted a game on The Fourth of July that notably featured an 11AM start. In every year (except 2020) since 2012 Nationals Park has hosted an 11AM July 4 game. The Nationals made the playoffs for the first time since relocating to Washington in the 2012 season, with Games 3, 4, and 5 of the 2012 National League Division Series against the St. Louis Cardinals being played in Nationals Park. Washington lost the NLDS three games to two.

==== 2013 season ====
Team owner Theodore N. Lerner approached D.C. Mayor Vincent Gray and other city officials in mid-July 2013 and asked if the city would pay to have a retractable roof built over Nationals Park. After seeing sketches, Gray rejected the proposal at the same meeting. No cost analyses were done before the meeting, although team architects speculated it would cost $300 million. City officials noted that the stadium was not designed for a roof.

==== 2014 season ====
On April 22, 2014, Saint Louis Cardinals slugger Albert Pujols hit his 500th career home run off Nationals pitcher Taylor Jordan. The Nationals made the playoffs for the second time since arriving in Washington. Nationals Park hosted Games 1 and 2 of the 2014 National League Division Series. The Nationals lost the series to the San Francisco Giants, three games to one.

==== 2015 NHL Winter Classic ====
On January 1, 2015, Nationals Park hosted the 2015 NHL Winter Classic before a crowd of 42,832 spectators. The Washington Capitals defeated the Chicago Blackhawks, 3–2, after former Blackhawk Troy Brouwer scored the go-ahead goal with 13 seconds remaining in regulation play. This made the Capitals only the second home team to win a Winter Classic and the first to win two Winter Classics, having won in Pittsburgh in 2011.

==== 2015 season ====
On July 17, 2015, during a regular-season game between the Nationals and the Los Angeles Dodgers, a series of three power outages affected a bank of lights along the park's third base line. The first power outage, which occurred in the bottom of the 4th inning, resulted in a delay of 1 hour and 22 minutes. Play was later resumed as the pitchers retired the next five batters. In the middle of the 5th inning, another power outage occurred, which resulted in a 40-minute delay. The bottom of the 5th inning was later played; at the end of the inning, a third power outage occurred. Due to the power outages, the game was suspended in the top of the 6th inning, with the Nationals leading the Dodgers 3–2 at that point. The game was resumed the next afternoon, with the Nationals winning against the Dodgers, 5–3.

==== 2016 season ====
The Nationals made the playoffs for the third time since arriving in Washington. Nationals Park hosted Games 1, 2, and 5 of the 2016 National League Division Series. The Nationals lost the series to the Los Angeles Dodgers, three games to two.

==== 2017 season ====
Before the 2017 season, the Nationals added the MGM National Harbor Dugout Club, named for the nearby Maryland casino which opened in December 2016. These seats were added near the first base dugout, in the approximate location where the tarp was stored in previous seasons. The tarp has been moved to the third-base side.

In late September 2017, a new organ was installed at Nationals Park, fulfilling the Washington Nationals organization's long-held goal of upgrading the stadium's organ. The Viscount Sonus 60, priced at $20,000 on European websites, was manufactured in Mondaino, Italy, and tuned in Harrisburg, Pennsylvania. It was installed in a former radio booth on the second floor of the stadium's press box, replacing a less-capable portable Hammond organ located in a corner of the stadium's sound effects control room. The new location gave the organist a private room for the first time and a better view of the field and crowd.

The Nationals made the playoffs for the fourth time since arriving in Washington. Nationals Park hosted Games 1, 2, and 5 of the 2017 National League Division Series. The Nationals lost the series to the Chicago Cubs three games to two.

==== 2018 Major League Baseball All-Star Game ====
Nationals Park hosted the 2018 Major League Baseball All-Star Game on July 17. It was the fifth MLB All-Star Game to be played in Washington, D.C., and the first in Washington since 1969. The American League beat the National League 8–6 before 43,843 fans.

==== 2019 World Series ====
Nationals Park hosted games 3, 4 and 5 of the 2019 World Series, the first in the city since 1933. The Nationals lost them all to the Houston Astros, but still won the series in seven games.

==== 2021 shooting ====
On July 17, 2021, at about 9:30 p.m. EDT, a shooting occurred outside of Nationals Park in Washington, D.C., during a baseball game between the Washington Nationals and the San Diego Padres. Three people were injured. The shooting happened in the middle of the sixth inning with San Diego holding an 8–4 lead. Some fans moved into the teams' dugouts and onto the field while others left the stadium.

Some stadium employees believed the incident to be a drive-by shooting. The Metropolitan Police Department of the District of Columbia (MPD) reported the shooting occurred at N Street and South Capitol Street SW, near the Third Base Gate.

In a joint statement the following day, Mayor of D.C. Muriel Bowser and Nationals owner Mark Lerner said, "While MPD's investigation is ongoing, it appears the incident involved a dispute between individuals in two vehicles. MPD does not believe the Washington Nationals, the ballpark or fans were the target."

The game was suspended and was completed the following day at 1:05 p.m., before that day's regularly scheduled game, without further incident. The Padres defeated the Nationals, 10–4.

==== 2024 season ====
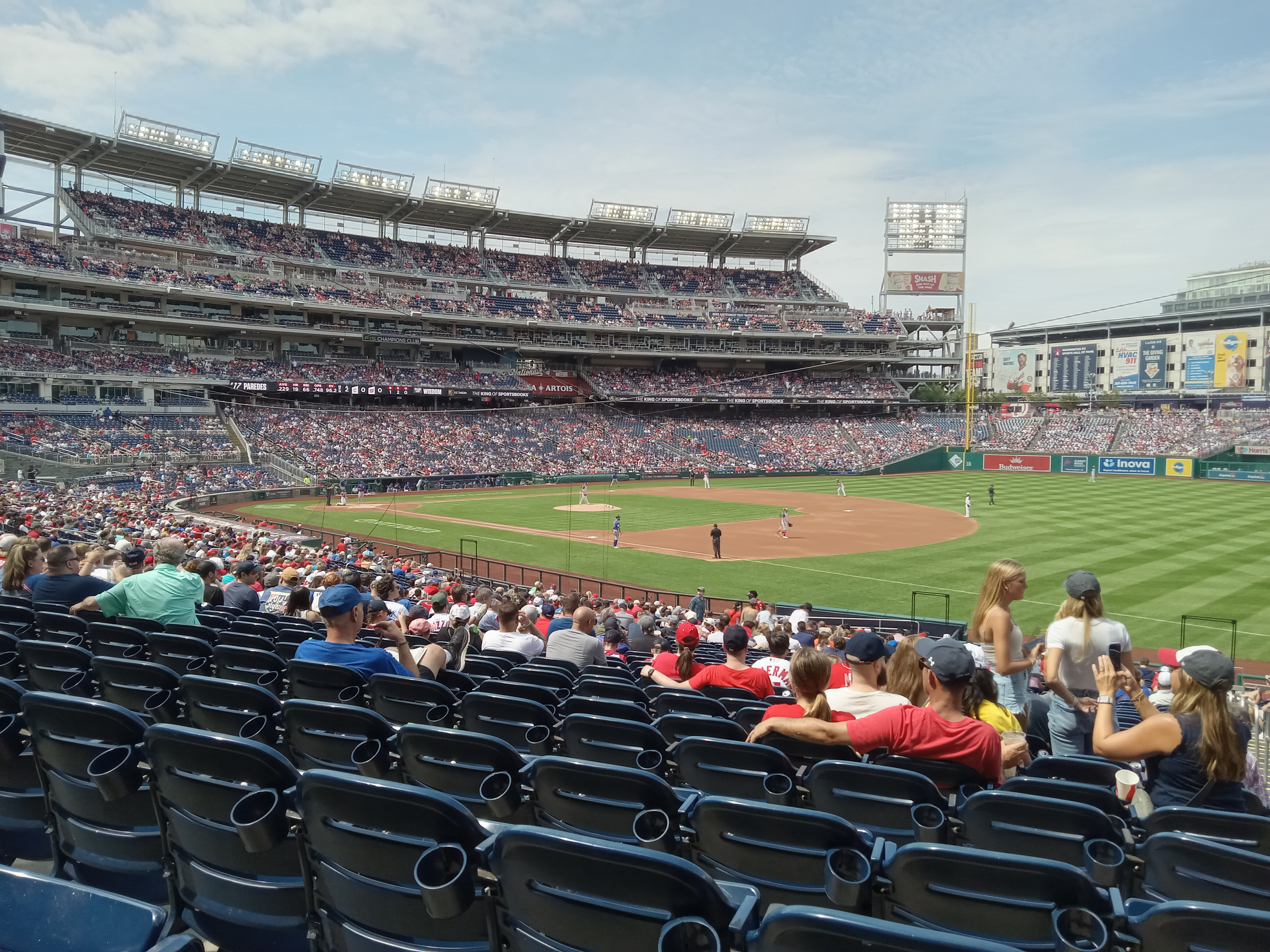
The Nationals play the Chicago Cubs on September 1, 2024

The 2024 season saw the heaviest facelift since construction in 2008. A new Daktronics 4,780-square foot jumbotron was installed, along with an upgrade of the ribbon board to 10MM resolution, while ads and LED signage upgrades were also completed. Audio and video upgrades were also completed, expanding the capabilities and speed of the technology providing statistics and information, as well as speaker upgrades that will be completed in phases. In addition, the stadium's lighting was overhauled, with the installation of brand new LED Musco Show-Light® entertainment technology. The new lighting provides brighter lights on existing structures and color changing features for Nationals home runs, wins, and other special occasions.

=== Washington Nationals average attendance ===
Average regular season attendance
| Season | Average attendance |
|---|---|
| 2008 | 29,005 |
| 2009 | 22,435 |
| 2010 | 22,569 |
| 2011 | 24,256 |
| 2012 | 29,269 |
| 2013 | 32,746 |
| 2014 | 31,844 |
| 2015 | 32,344 |
| 2016 | 30,641 |
| 2017 | 31,173 |
| 2018 | 31,775 |
| 2019 | 27,899 |
| 2020 | 0 |
| 2021 | 18,093 |
| 2022 | 25,017 |
| 2023 | 23,034 |
| 2024 | 24,288 |

== Features ==
As of the 2017 season, the ballpark has 41,338 seats and features 79 suites on three levels, all around the infield. Team President Stan Kasten also said that the team might sell the naming rights to the levels of the luxury suites, which currently bear the names of presidents Washington, Jefferson and Lincoln. While the city agreed to spend up to $611 million, Kasten has stated that the principal owners, the Lerner family, spent tens of millions of dollars more on "jazzing up the park". The park has an out-of-town scoreboard, which is 102 feet (31 m) long, installed in the right-field wall. The main scoreboard, at 101 feet (31 m) long and 47 feet (14 m) high, is more than five times the size of the one at RFK Stadium.

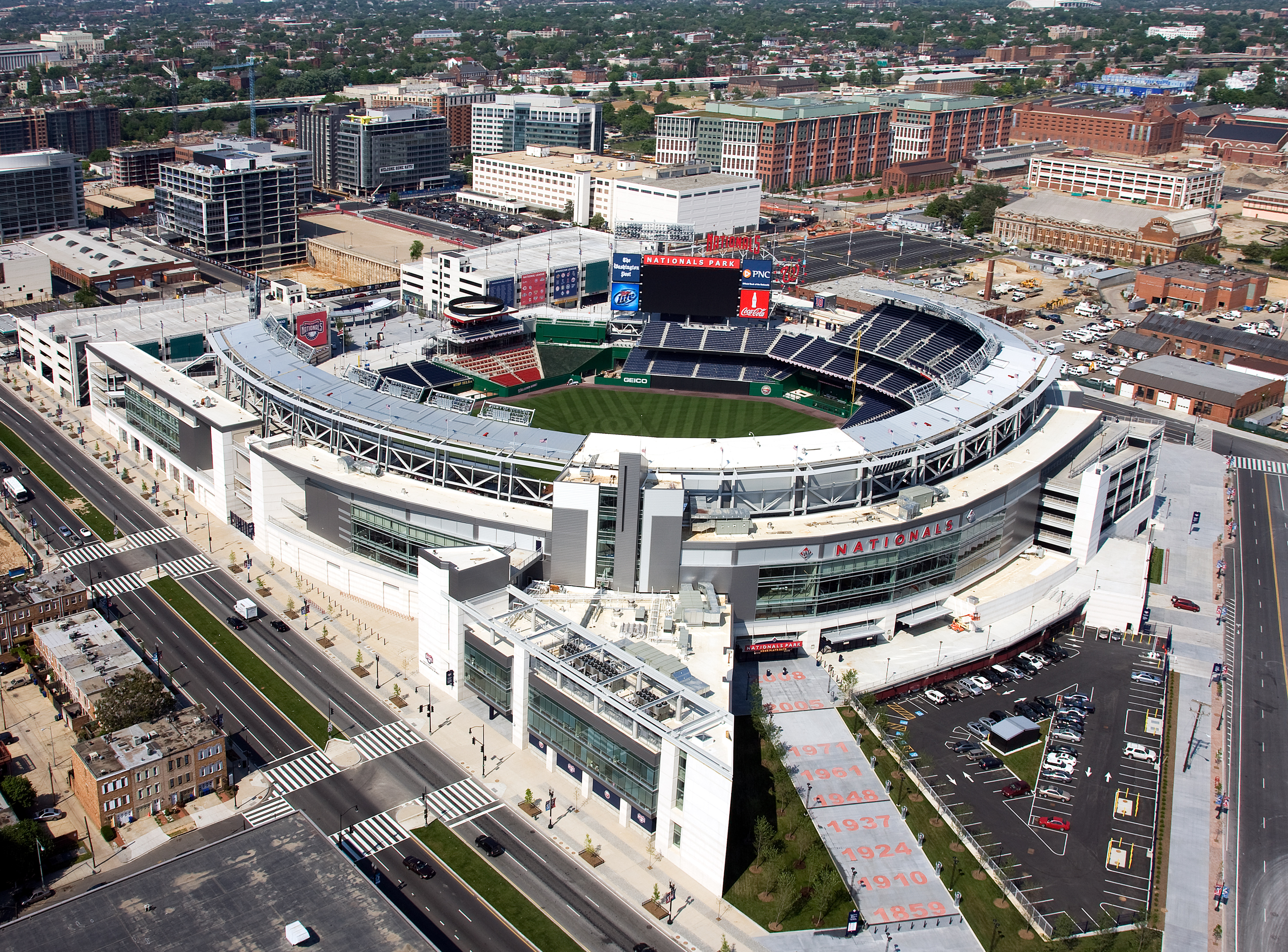
Aerial view of Nationals Park in May 2008. The Nationals' previous stadium, RFK Stadium, is barely visible near the top of the picture.

On March 13, 2007, Kasten announced that there would be a grove of cherry blossoms located just beyond the left-field bleachers. Kasten stated that the cherry blossoms would provide a look that Americans associate with the nation's capital.

Other distinctive features of the ballpark are the views of the U.S. Capitol from the upper deck. These views have been mostly blocked by new construction in recent years. Fans in the upper deck sitting down the right-field line near the foul pole can get a glimpse of the Washington Monument and the National Cathedral during day games. Several area-based food establishments have concession stands: Ben's Chili Bowl hot dogs, Dogfish Head and Flying Dog Brewery beer.

Another feature, The Budweiser Brew House, is a full-service sit-down restaurant located in center field. It offers some unusual amenities such as salads, along with regular ballpark fare such as burgers and hot dogs. When the stadium first opened in 2008, the restaurant was enclosed by glass windows with a view of the field, which were soon made retractable. The restaurant was eventually expanded to outside the interior, with tables being placed in three rows outside.

The ballpark's press box is named in honor of longtime Washington Post sports columnist and reporter Shirley Povich, cited as a longtime friend of Lerner by the team.

In 2010, the stadium added the Ring of Honor, celebrating players from the Washington Senators (Joe Cronin, Rick Ferrell, Goose Goslin, Clark Griffith, Bucky Harris, Walter Johnson, Harmon Killebrew, Heinie Manush, Sam Rice, and Early Wynn), Negro league Washington Homestead Grays (Cool Papa Bell, Ray Brown, Josh Gibson, Buck Leonard, Cumberland Posey, and Jud Wilson), and the Nationals franchise's previous incarnation, the Montreal Expos (Gary Carter and Andre Dawson), who have been inducted into the Baseball Hall of Fame.

Since 2011, a submarine dive horn has blared after every Nationals home run and win—a nod to the park's location in the Navy Yard neighborhood. As with any World Series victory, as the team did in 2019, Queen's "We Are the Champions" is played over the PA.

In September 2018, Nationals Park began using a bullpen cart.

In September 2018, the ashes of John McNamara, a sportswriter killed in the Capital Gazette shooting, were spread in the flowers just over the left-field fence.

In terms of batting park factor ESPN writer Tristan H. Cockcroft has said that "Nationals Park has been remarkably consistent in its neutrality from a run-scoring perspective."

On January 11, 2021, the Nationals announced a partnership agreement with Bet MGM, a subsidiary of MGM Resorts International, to open a sportsbook at Nationals Park. The sportsbook will be accessible from outside the park and located by the Center Field Gate in a space formerly occupied by auxiliary event space Center Field Social. Fans inside the stadium will be able to bet using a mobile device within the stadium and a two-block radius of the ballpark.

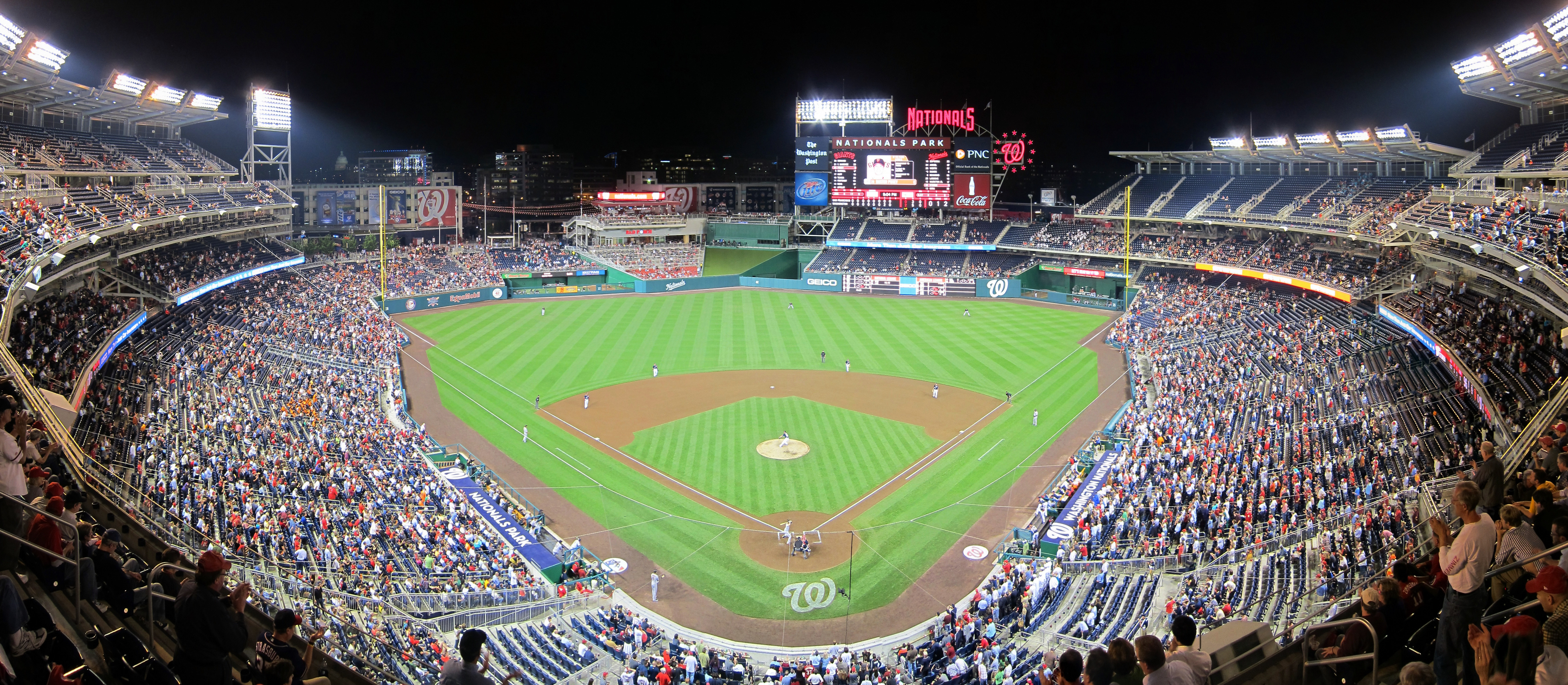
Panoramic image of Nationals Park during a home game against the San Francisco Giants, May 2, 2011

=== Seating ===
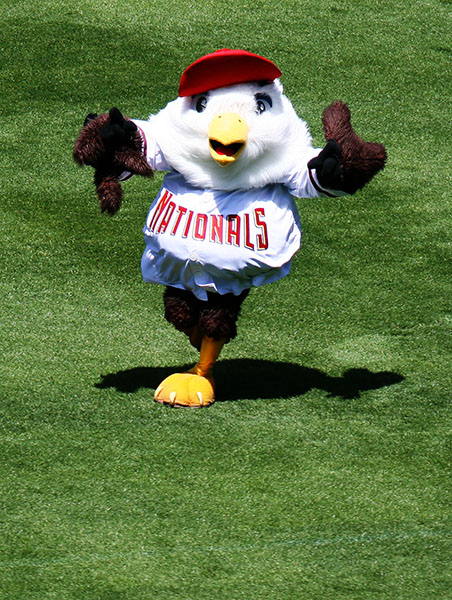
Screech, the Washington Nationals mascot before his 2009 "growth spurt"

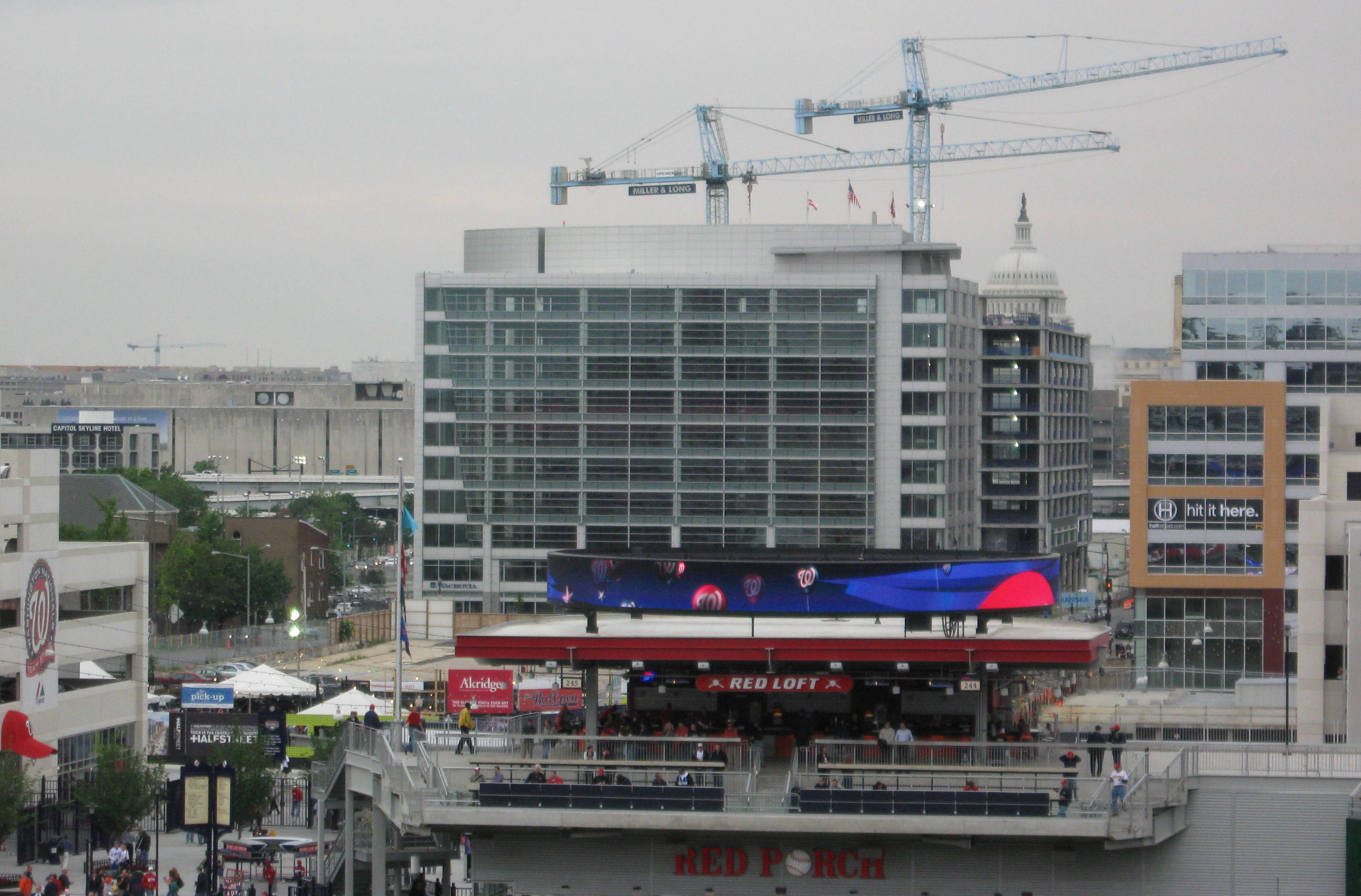
Some fans in the upper level can see the dome of the Capitol.

Seating at Nationals Park is divided into over twelve different pricing zones. There are five seating levels: the field level, mezzanine level, suite level, gallery level, and upper gallery level.

The stadium features three premium clubs that are not on the suite level. The largest of the three, the FIS Champions Club, is a two-story indoor lounge exclusively for fans with tickets in sections 206–221. The lounge is 33,000 square feet (3,100 m^{2}) and features various food entities, live television broadcasts of the game on dozens of TVs, and views of the Anacostia River. In 2021, various displays highlighting the history of baseball in the District of Columbia and awards won by the Nationals and their players were installed. It was previously named the Stars and Stripes Club from 2008-2014 and the Norfolk Southern Club from 2014-2021 until the naming rights were purchased by FIS following the 2021 season.

The PNC Diamond Club, the naming rights of which were purchased by PNC Bank, is on the field level between the two dugouts. It was remodeled and expanded into two floors before the 2016 season and features a gourmet buffet and all-inclusive food and drink. The Terra Club seats are located directly behind home plate and are the most expensive seats in the stadium. Like the PNC Diamond Club, seats in the Terra Club feature all inclusive food and drink and include access to an indoor lounge with a gourmet buffet and views of the Nationals batting cages and press conference room. It was previously named the Lexus Presidents Club from 2008-2015 and the Delta Sky360 Club from 2016-2021 until Terra purchased the naming rights prior to the 2022 season.

As features were changed, added, or removed, seating capacity has changed repeatedly since the stadium opened; the number of seats has dropped slightly several times since it opened in 2008. In the inaugural 2008 season, seating capacity was 41,888; as of 2016, the seating capacity is 41,313. The seating capacity increased to 41,339 in 2017. By 2023, the seating capacity had increased to 41,373.

Nationals Park contains a split in the upper deck, an homage to Griffith Stadium.

| Years | Capacity | Ref. |
|---|---|---|
| 2008–2009 | 41,888 | |
| 2010–2011 | 41,546 | |
| 2012 | 41,487 | |
| 2013–2014 | 41,418 | |
| 2015 | 41,285 | |
| 2016 | 41,313 | |
| 2017 | 41,339 | |
| 2018 | 41,855 | |
| 2019–2020 | 42,531 | |
| 2021–2022 | 41,380 | |
| 2023–present | 41,373 | |

== Non-baseball events ==
Nationals Park has hosted several non-baseball events, such as concerts and business meetings.

=== Hockey ===
On January 1, 2015, the National Hockey League held its "Winter Classic" – the New Year's Day traditional outdoor game – at Nationals Park. A hockey rink was constructed on the field where the home team Washington Capitals hosted the Chicago Blackhawks. The Capitals scored the game-winning goal with 13 seconds left in the 3rd period, defeating the Blackhawks, 3–2.

=== Concerts ===
Performers who have held concerts at Nationals Park include Billy Joel, Taylor Swift, Shakira, Lady Gaga, and Bruce Springsteen, and Stray Kids, among others.

| Date | Artist | Opening act(s) | Tour / Concert name | Attendance | Revenue | Notes |
|---|---|---|---|---|---|---|
| July 11, 2009 | Billy Joel; Elton John | — | Face to Face 2009 | 38,617 / 38,617 | $4,638,645 | |
| July 23, 2010 | Dave Matthews Band | Zac Brown Band | 2010 Summer Tour | 36,772 / 36,939 | $2,701,617 | |
| September 14, 2012 | Bruce Springsteen & The E Street Band | — | Wrecking Ball World Tour | 36,525 / 36,525 | $3,305,920 | Ali Weinberg, the daughter of Max Weinberg, performed accordion on "American Land", and backing vocals on "Twist and Shout" and "Shout". |
| July 12, 2013 | Paul McCartney | — | Out There Tour | 39,515 / 39,515 | $4,452,036 | |
| July 25, 2014 | Jason Aldean | Florida Georgia Line; Tyler Farr | Burn It Down Tour | 32,263 / 36,948 | $2,188,891 | |
| July 26, 2014 | Billy Joel | Gavin DeGraw | Billy Joel in Concert | 38,487 / 38,487 | $4,200,480 | |
| August 11, 2014 | One Direction | 5 Seconds of Summer | Where We Are Tour | 42,834 / 42,834 | $4,233,063 | |
| July 13, 2015 | Taylor Swift | Vance Joy; Shawn Mendes; Haim | The 1989 World Tour | 85,014 / 85,014 | $9,730,596 | Lorde was the special guest. |
| July 14, 2015 | Taylor Swift | Vance Joy; Shawn Mendes; Haim | The 1989 World Tour | 85,014 / 85,014 | $9,730,596 | Jason Derulo was the special guest. |
| August 14, 2015 | Zac Brown Band | The Avett Brothers | Jekyll and Hyde Tour | — | — | |
| July 30, 2016 | Billy Joel | Charlie Puth | Billy Joel in Concert | 37,807 / 37,807 | $4,031,634 | |
| September 1, 2016 | Bruce Springsteen & The E Street Band | — | The River Tour 2016 | 36,463 / 36,463 | $4,627,705 | |
| July 14, 2017 | James Taylor | Bonnie Riatt | It's a Home Run! | — | — | |
| July 26, 2018 | Eagles | James Taylor & His All-Star Band | An Evening With the Eagles | — | — | |
| July 27, 2018 | Zac Brown Band | OneRepublic; Caroline Jones | Down the Rabbit Hole Live | — | — | |
| August 8, 2021 | Green Day; Weezer | The Interrupters | Hella Mega Tour | 34,851 / 34,851 | $2,904,583 | Originally scheduled for August 21, 2020, but was postponed due to the COVID-19 pandemic. Fall Out Boy was scheduled to co-headline, but pulled out due to a positive COVID-19 test within the band's organization. Rivers Cuomo of Weezer performed a cover of "Sugar, We're Goin Down" after Fall Out Boy was not able to perform. |
| June 22, 2022 | Mötley Crüe; Def Leppard | Poison; Joan Jett and the Blackhearts; Classless Act | The Stadium Tour | 29,618 / 35,572 | $3,337,638 | Originally scheduled for August 22, 2020, but was postponed due to the COVID-19 pandemic. |
| August 8, 2022 | Lady Gaga | — | The Chromatica Ball | 35,920 / 35,920 | $4,885,864 | |
| August 23, 2022 | Bad Bunny | Deorro | World's Hottest Tour | 38,481 / 38,481 | $7,936,521 | |
| September 8, 2022 | Red Hot Chili Peppers | The Strokes; Thundercat | 2022 Global Stadium Tour | 37,138 / 37,138 | $4,924,889 | |
| September 24, 2022 | Elton John | — | Farewell Yellow Brick Road | 39,434 / 39,434 | $7,193,710 | |
| August 7, 2023 | P!nk | Grouplove; KidCutUp; Pat Benatar; Neil Giraldo | Summer Carnival | — | — | |
| July 29, 2024 | Green Day | The Smashing Pumpkins; Rancid; The Linda Lindas | The Saviors Tour | — | — | |
| September 7, 2024 | Bruce Springsteen & The E Street Band | — | Springsteen and E Street Band 2023 Tour | — | — | Originally scheduled for September 29, 2023, but postponed due to illness. |
| June 23, 2025 | Stray Kids | | Dominate World Tour | | | |
| August 10, 2025 | Chris Brown | Summer Walker; Bryson Tiller | Breezy Bowl XX | | | |
| October 8, 2025 | Chris Brown | Jhené Aiko; Bryson Tiller | Breezy Bowl XX | | | |
| August 17, 2026 | Foo Fighters | Queens of the Stone Age; Mannequin Pussy | Take Cover Tour | | | |
| July 16, 2027 | Slipknot | Bring Me The Horizon; Acid Bath | (sic)est Stadium Tour | | | |

=== Papal Mass ===
On April 17, 2008, Pope Benedict XVI celebrated Mass at Nationals Park for 47,000 people during his visit to the United States. There were 200,000 requests submitted for tickets to the Mass.

== See also ==
- Lists of stadiums

Events and tenants
| Preceded by RFK Stadium | Home of the Washington Nationals; 2008 – present | Succeeded by Current |
| Preceded by RFK Stadium | Home of the United States Congressional Baseball Game; 2008 – present | Succeeded by Current |
| Preceded by Michigan Stadium | Host of the NHL Winter Classic; 2015 | Succeeded by Gillette Stadium |
| Preceded by Marlins Park (Miami Marlins) | Host of the Major League Baseball All-Star Game; 2018 | Succeeded by Progressive Field (Cleveland Indians) |
