= Cheryl L. McAfee =

American architect (born c. 1958)

Cheryl Lynn McAfee
- Born: c. 1958 (age 67–68); Wichita, Kansas, U.S.
- Other names: Cheryl Lynn McAfee Mitchell; Cheryl McAfee-Mitchell
- Education: Kansas State University; Harvard University
- Occupation: Architect
- Father: Charles F. McAfee

Cheryl Lynn McAfee, FAIA, NOMA (born c. 1958), is an American architect. She is the CEO of McAfee^{3}, an architecture firm founded by her father Charles F. McAfee. In 1990, she was the first woman to receive an architecture license in the state of Kansas. McAfee was named one of the "Top Women Architects" by Ebony magazine in 1995. McAfee led the design and construction of sports venues of the 1996 Olympics in Atlanta.

== Early life and education ==
Cheryl Lynn McAfee was born in c. 1958 in Wichita, Kansas, to parents Gloria Myrth Winston, a public school teacher and principal, and Charles F. McAfee, an architect. One of her two sisters, Charyl Frena McAfee-Duncan, is also an architect and works at McAfee^{3}.

She graduated with a B.Arch in 1979 from Kansas State University; and with a master of architecture degree in 1981 from Harvard University. She interned at The Architects Collaborative (TAC) under Sarah P. Harkness, before and during her attendance at Harvard University.

In 1994, she married Reginald C. Mitchell.

== Career ==
She started working at McAfee^{3} (formerly Charles F. McAfee Architects, Engineers, and Planners firm) in 1981. In 1990, she was the first women to receive an architecture license in the state of Kansas. She relocated in 1990 to Atlanta to prepare to lead the design and construction for all 33 sports venues of the 1996 Olympics in Atlanta. After the end of the Olympics, she worked to convert the Olympic Stadium into Turner Field. In 1995, Mc Afee was elected as president of National Organization of Minority Architects (NOMA) and was the first female president. She was the principal architect on the joint design effort for the Hartsfield–Jackson Atlanta International Airport from 2000 until 2015.

McAfee was elected to the Fellow of the American Institute of Architects (FAIA) in 2003. In 2004, McAfee was the chair of the design commission in the city of Atlanta.

In 2023, McAfee and her team at McAfee^{3} redesigned and modernized six library branches of the Atlanta-Fulton Public Library System.

== See also ==
- African-American architects
- Ivenue Love-Stanley
