= Richard Wittschiebe Hand =

American architecture firm

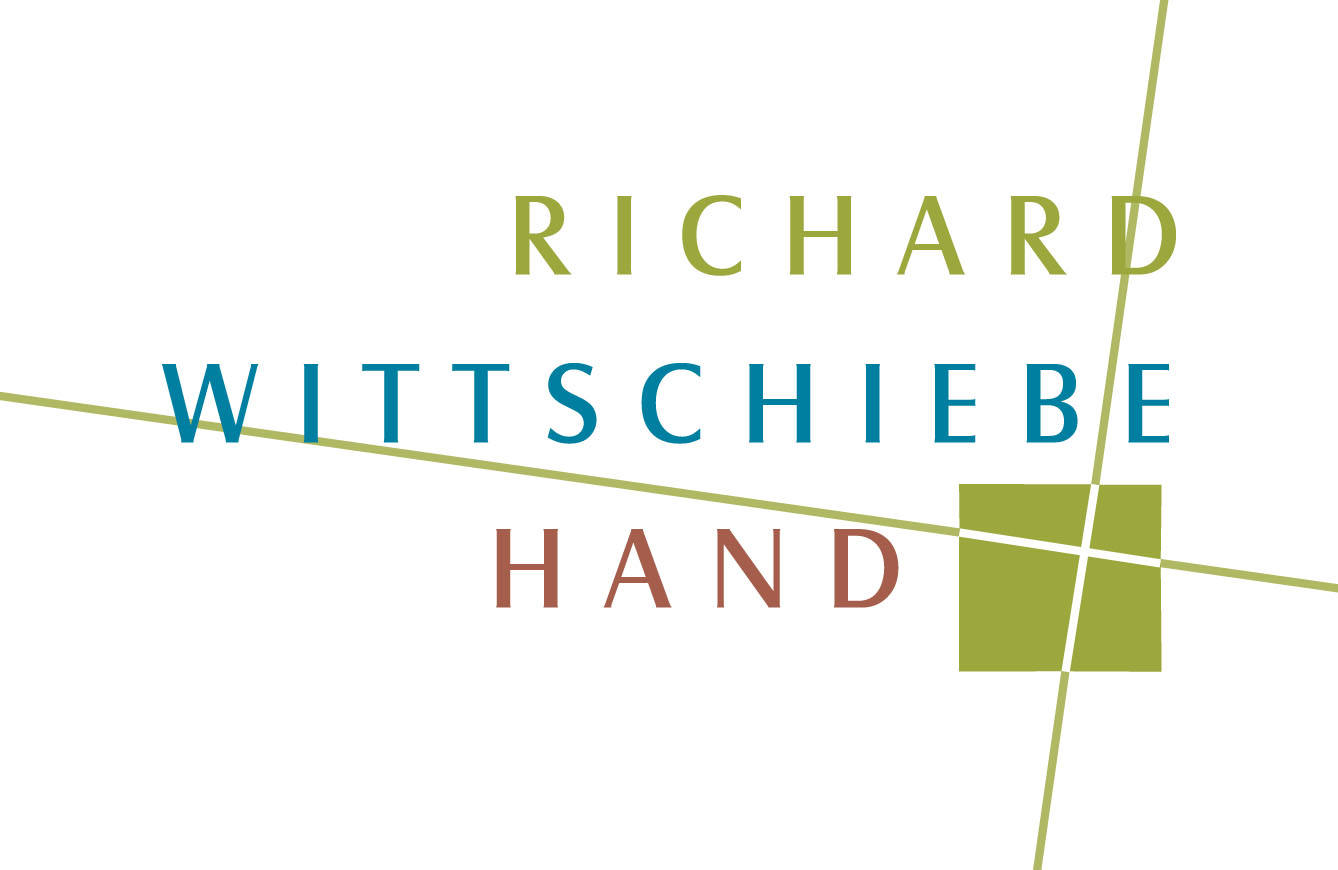
Richard Wittschiebe Hand

Richard Wittschiebe Hand (rwhdesign, RWH, formerly Richard + Wittschiebe, Hand Design Studio) was an architecture firm based in Atlanta, Georgia, with an office in Madison, Wisconsin. Richard Wittschiebe Hand specialized in architecture, interior design, planning, and green/LEED consulting. RWH focused primarily on K-12 schools, colleges and universities, corporate and industrial office spaces, aquatic facilities, recreational and parks buildings, and fraternity houses. Richard Wittschiebe Hand was awarded the 2011 AIA Georgia "Firm Of The Year" award.

In 2014, Richard Wittschiebe Hand merged with Stevens & Wilkinson, which merged with SSOE Group in 2021.

== History ==
Richard Wittschiebe Hand was formed in 2007 when Richard + Wittschiebe merged with Hand Design Studio (formerly Peter H. Hand and Associates, Inc.) to become Richard Wittschiebe Hand. Richard + Wittschiebe was formed by Janice Wittschiebe, AIA and Carol Richard, AIA.

== Partners ==
Carol Richard, founder of the firm, has been providing professional services since 1980 as a project designer and project manager for numerous project types and sizes.

Janice Wittschiebe has been providing professional services since 1980 as a project designer, project manager and principal for large multi-faceted projects.

Peter Hand has provided professional architecture services in the southeast since 1973. He served as principal of Hand Design Studio, and consulting principal of Richard Wittschiebe Hand.

William (Bill) Polk has provided professional expertise in all phases of planning, design, production and contract administration for a variety of project types, including medical facilities, education, single and multi-family housing, and institutional including kitchen and assembly design and military facilities since 1984.

== Technology and sustainable design ==
RWH utilized ArchiCAD BIM 3D modeling software on 8-core Apple MacPro workstations for architectural projects, and was one of the first firms in Atlanta to implement a BIM design system in 1989, and the first in Atlanta to use ArchiCAD. RWH was also one of the few architecture firms in Atlanta to use Apple Macintosh workstations. Each workstation had access to the BIM server where realtime collaborative design and document production occurred. In addition, RWH designed Ross Street House, the first LEED-Platinum home in the state of Wisconsin, using entirely ArchiCAD. Over 90% of the staff were LEED Accredited Professionals (LEED AP).

== ASHRAE headquarters ==
In 2006, the headquarters building of the American Society of Heating, Refrigerating and Air-Conditioning Engineers (ASHRAE) in Atlanta, Georgia underwent planning and development for the renewal of their 35,000-square-foot (3,300 m^{2}) office building. ASHRAE hired Richard Wittschiebe Hand as the architecture firm. The finished building achieved a LEED-Platinum rating by the USGBC. The building renovation/addition includes a new training center, meeting and education spaces, a technical library, offices, a loading area and bulk storage.

One of the most innovative components in the building's design is an extensive measurement and verification system that monitors and measures electricity, energy consumption, water use, and local weather conditions in real-time. This monitoring was essential to ASHRAE's "walk the walk" theme by proving the tangible and financial benefits of green design. The data is available to national and international members through internet-based programs.
