= National Organization of Minority Architects =

- National Organization of Minority Architects
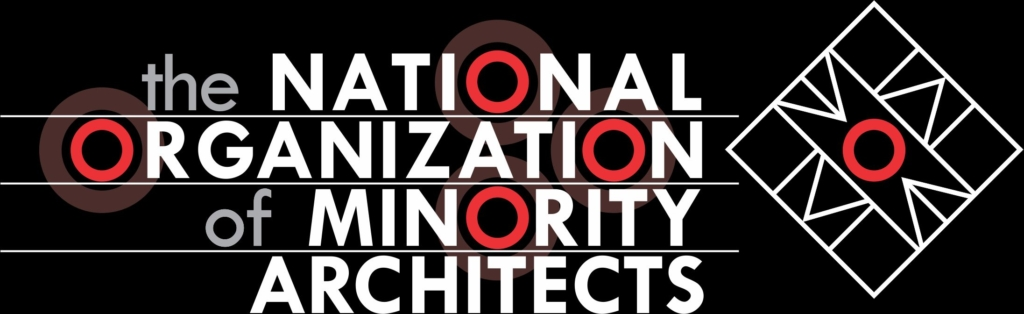
- Abbreviation: NOMA
- Formation: 1971; 55 years ago
- Founder: William M. Brown Jr., Leroy M. Campbell, Wendell Campbell, John S. Chase, James C. Dodd, Kenneth G. Groggs, Nelson Harris, Jeh V. Johnson, E.H. McDowell, Robert J. Nash, Harold Williams, Robert Wilson, Louis Edwin Fry Sr., Pedro Frank Lopez
- Founded at: Detroit, Michigan
- Type: Nonprofit
- Purpose: Architectural profession
- Professional title: NOMA
- Headquarters: Washington, D.C.
- Region served: United States
- Website: www.noma.net

The National Organization of Minority Architects (NOMA) is a professional organization for individuals practicing architecture and allied professionals to advance justice and equity in communities of color.

== History ==
In 1968, activist and executive director of the National Urban League, Whitney Young was invited to address the American Institute of Architects (AIA) National Convention in Portland, Oregon as the keynote speaker. In his speech, he addressed the institute's silent stance on the turmoil in the country and urged them to stand up and endorse the efforts of John F. Kennedy & Martin Luther King Jr. in their actions. This speech encouraged the profession to work towards the advancement of minority architects, who, at the time, made up of 0.05% of AIA's 20,000 members.

At the 1971 AIA National Convention in Detroit, 12 black architects, including William Brown and John S. Chase, began to organize to create an organization that developed and advanced black architects, which would become the National Organization of Minority Architects (NOMA). The organization aimed to promote and advocate for black architects and their work through networking opportunities and education. The organization's advocacy first focused on government contracts to include minority participation. The first president of the organization was founder Wendell Campbell in 1971, who held the position until 1973.

In 1992, NOMA Students was created during the national conference in Washington.

== Organization ==
=== Membership ===
Membership is open to anyone in the architecture, engineering, and construction (AEC) fields. NOMA members are registered with their local NOMA professional chapter or at-large members when there is not a chapter local to them. As of 2022, there are 36 professional chapters and 86 student chapters.

There are five types of membership in NOMA:

- Licensed Professional - Individuals licensed to practice architecture in the United States
- Associate Member - Individuals with three or more years of professional architecture experience but not licensed architects
- Emerging Professional - Individuals with three or less years of professional architecture experience but not licensed architects
- International Member - Individuals who have an equivalent architectural license from a non-U.S. licensing authority
- Student Member - Individuals currently enrolled in an accredited architecture program
- Allied Professional - Individuals who are not practicing architecture but are in positions related to the field

=== Structure ===
At the national level, NOMA is governed by a board of directors and supported by a leadership council. There are four regions that lead state and local chapters and facilitate communication between those and national leadership. Each state is seen as a chapter and there can be additional professional and student chapters within the state.

=== Service ===
By speaking with a united voice, NOMA members influence government practices that affect the practice of the profession by minorities and have advocated for government contracts to include minority participation.

The organization develops mentorship programs, student grants, and partnerships with other organizations including AIA to increase minorities in the field.

== Presidents ==
- Wendell Jerome Campbell, 1971–1973
- Leroy Campbell, 1974
- John S. Chase, 1975
- Charles F. McAfee, FAIA, NOMAC, 1976
- Kenneth B. Groggs, 1977
- Andrew Heard, 1978
- Leon Bridges, 1981
- Harold Williams, 1982
- Paul S. Devrouax, 1983
- Marshall Purnell, 1985
- Earl Kai Chann, 1987–1988, first non-Black president
- Harry Overstreet, 1989–1990
- William Stanley III, 1991–1992
- Robert Easter, FAIA, NOMAC, 1993–1994
- Michael A. Rogers, AIA, NOMAC, 1995
- Cheryl L. McAfee, FAIA, NOMAC, 1996, first female president
- Roberta Washington, 1997
- Ronald E. Garner, NOMAC, 1998
- William E. Davis Jr., AIA, NOMAC, 1999
- Paul L. Taylor Jr., AIA, NOMAC, 2001
- Kenneth Martin, AIA, NOMAC, 2002
- Drake Dillard, 2003
- James Washington Jr., FAIA, NOMAC, 2004–2006
- Carlton Smith, FAIA, NOMAC, 2007–2008
- R. Steven Lewis, FAIA, NOMAC, 2009–2010
- Sanford Garner, AIA, NOMAC, 2011–2012
- Kathy Denise Dixon, FAIA, NOMAC, 2013–2014
- Kevin Holland, FAIA, NOMAC, 2015–2016
- Bryan Hudson, AIA, NOMAC, 2017–2018
- Kimberly Dowdell, 2019–2020
- Jason Pugh, AIA, NOMA, 2021–2022
- Pascale Sablan, FAIA, NOMA, 2023–2024
- Bryan C Lee Jr, FAIA, NOMA, 2025–2026
