= Jan Lorenc =

Polish-American designer and author (born 1954)

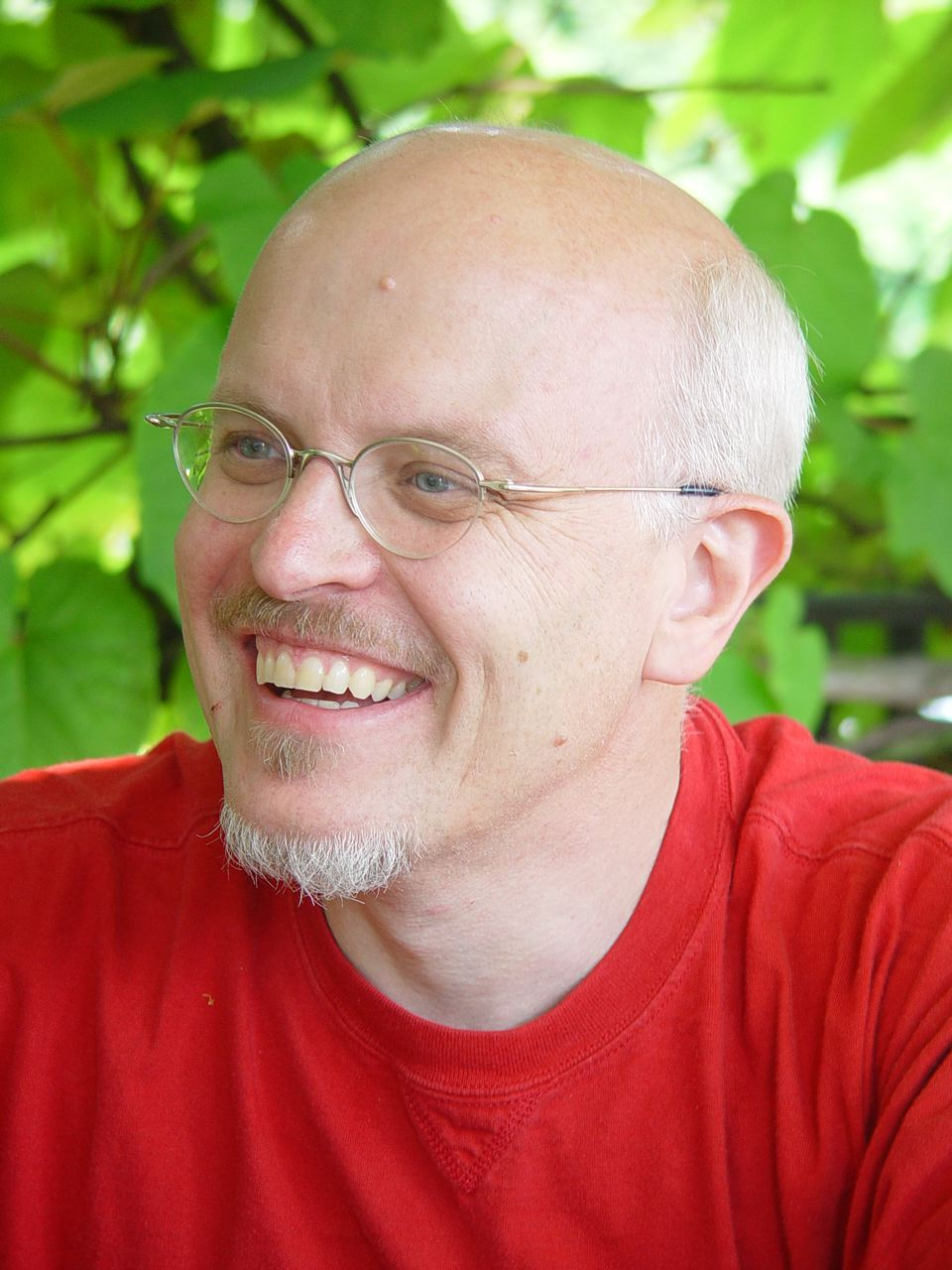
Jan Lorenc

Jan Lorenc is a Polish-American designer and author. Born in Jaśliska, Poland in 1954, he immigrated to the United States at the age of 8. He formed Lorenc Design in 1978 in Chicago, and later moved it to Atlanta in 1981.

== Biography ==
Lorenc is a graduate of the Illinois Institute of Technology (IIT; 1977, 1979) with a B.S. and M.S. in Industrial Design and Visual Communication, respectively, as well as a graduate of the Georgia Institute of Technology (GA Tech; 1994) with a M.S. in Architecture.

Lorenc has received a number of awards, including "Monuments to the Profession of Environmental Graphic Design" by the SEGD (1998), First Place in the ICSC awards, a seat on the GA Tech ID Advisory Board in the School of Architecture, and featured speaking positions for such groups as the AIA and Auburn University. He has also sat on design competition juries, both domestically and internationally.

In 2007, Lorenc coauthored a textbook on the practice of exhibition design entitled, "What Is Exhibition Design?" coauthored with designers Lee Skolnick and Craig Berger, the book was published by Rotovision, UK. It is currently in its third English printing and has been printed in Chinese, Korean, Polish and Russian.

In 2017, Lorenc was named by the Society for Experiential Graphic Design (SEGD) as its 2017 SEGD Fellow. According to SEGD, "SEGD Fellows are the laureates of environmental graphic design, recognized for creating a body of work that epitomizes the highest standards of practice in the field."

== Work ==
Lorenc's firm, Lorenc Design, specializes in industrial design, exhibition design architectural design, furniture design, interior design, and environmental graphics. The firm identifies its work as "environmental communication design," a body of work that includes museums and visitors centers, trade show exhibits, theme park design, signage, retail spaces, and furniture for organizations including Mayo Clinic, Coca-Cola, North Carolina State University, Georgia-Pacific, Haworth Furniture Company, General Motors, Bank of America, General Mills and Sony-Ericsson. This array of work is typically coordinated with a project team including project managers, writers, architects, interior designers, landscape architects, graphic design firms, marketing professionals and others that are searching for a "holistic, integrated message."

Lorenc Design is located in the historic Mill Village in Roswell, Georgia and has collaborative associations with Journey Communications Inc. of Philadelphia and Box&Cox of Seoul, South Korea. The company also collaborates with the firm HQ Creative in Dubai, the United Arab Emirates.

The firm was called Lorenc+Yoo Design from 1998-2021.

With his son Richard Lorenc of the Foundation for Economic Education (FEE), Lorenc designed FEE's offices, which won a 2017 Silver award from the design industry publication Graphis.

Before starting his firm, Lorenc created the iconic design for the Target stores logo.

=== Teaching ===
Lorenc has served as a lecturer at the Savannah College of Art and Design in Atlanta. He has also taught as an adjunct lecturer at Georgia Institute of Technology's School of Architecture.

Lorenc lectures throughout the world on the topics of environmental graphic design, exhibition design, and wayfinding/signage. Within the United States, he has lectured at the Illinois Institute of Technology, Georgia Institute of Technology, Auburn University, University of Georgia, North Carolina State University, Savannah College of Art and Design, and the Portfolio Center and Art Institute of Atlanta.

Internationally, Lorenc has lectured mostly in Eastern Asia. He has lectured at Tongji University (Shanghai, China), Hong Ik University (Seoul, Korea), Sunmoon University (Asan, Korea) Hong Kong Polytechnic University (Hong Kong), SADI – Samsung Art and Design Institute (Seoul, Korea), EWHA Women’s University (Seoul, Korea), and KODFA – Korean Design Firms Association (Seoul, Korea).

=== Publications ===
Lorenc and his firm's work have been published in several American and international publications, including Exhibitor Magazine, I.D. Magazine, Archi Volta Quarterly (Poland), VM+SD, Space (Korea) and Interiors and Sources.

== See also ==
- List of Auburn University people
