= Granada Shoppes and Studios =

- U.S. National Register of Historic Places
- Los Angeles Historic-Cultural Monument
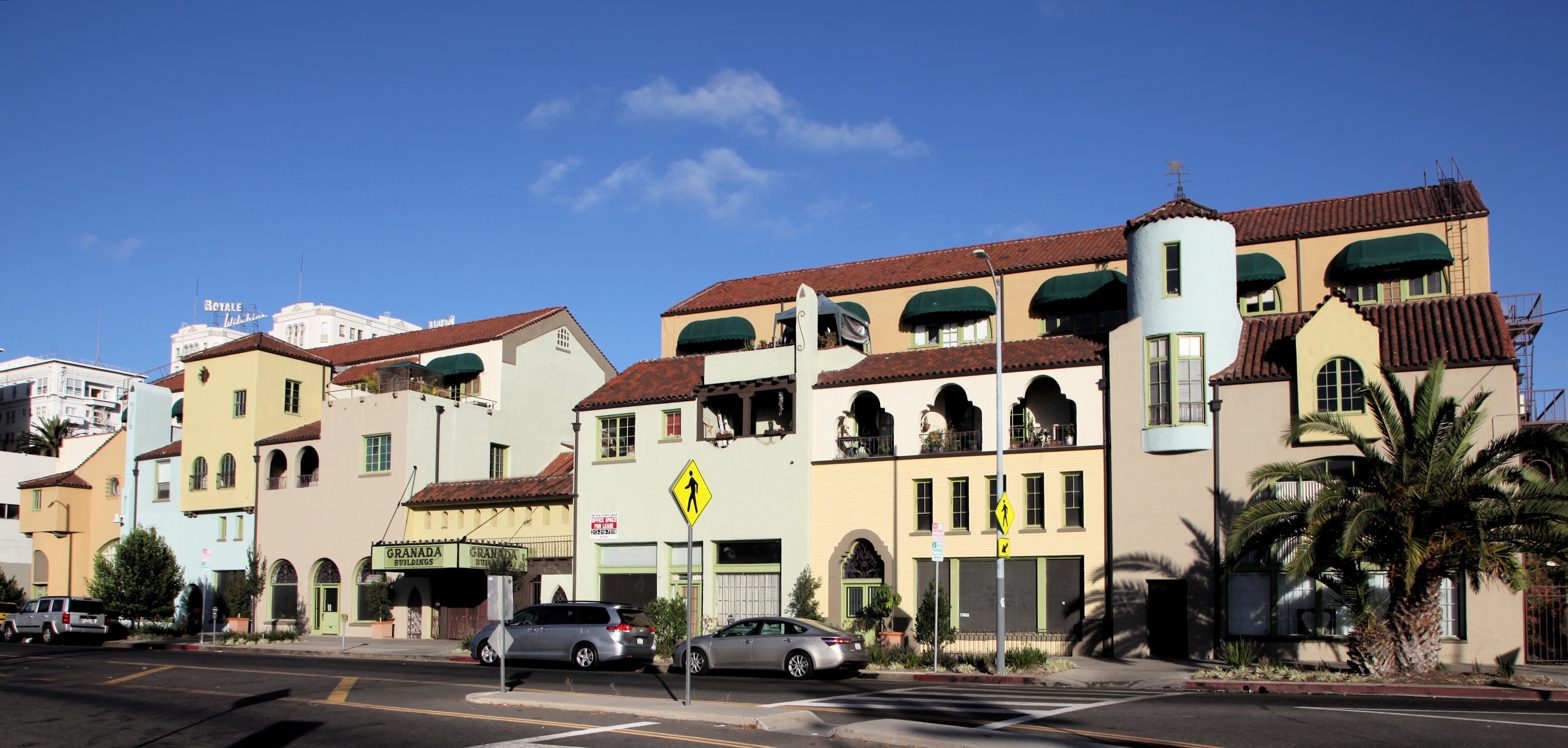

- Location within the Los Angeles metropolitan area Location within California Location within the United States
- Location: 672 S. Lafayette Park Place, Westlake District, Los Angeles, California
- Coordinates: 34°3′38″N 118°16′57″W
- Built: 1927
- Architect: Franklin Harper
- Architectural style: Mediterranean Revival, Spanish Colonial Revival
- NRHP reference No.: 86003320
- LAHCM No.: 238

Significant dates
- Added to NRHP: November 20, 1986
- Designated LAHCM: 1981-04-09

Granada Shoppes and Studios, also known as the Granada Buildings, is an imaginative, Mediterranean Revival and Spanish Colonial Revival style block-long complex consisting of four courtyard-connected structures, in Central Los Angeles, California. It was built immediately to the southeast of Lafayette Park in the Westlake District, in 1927.

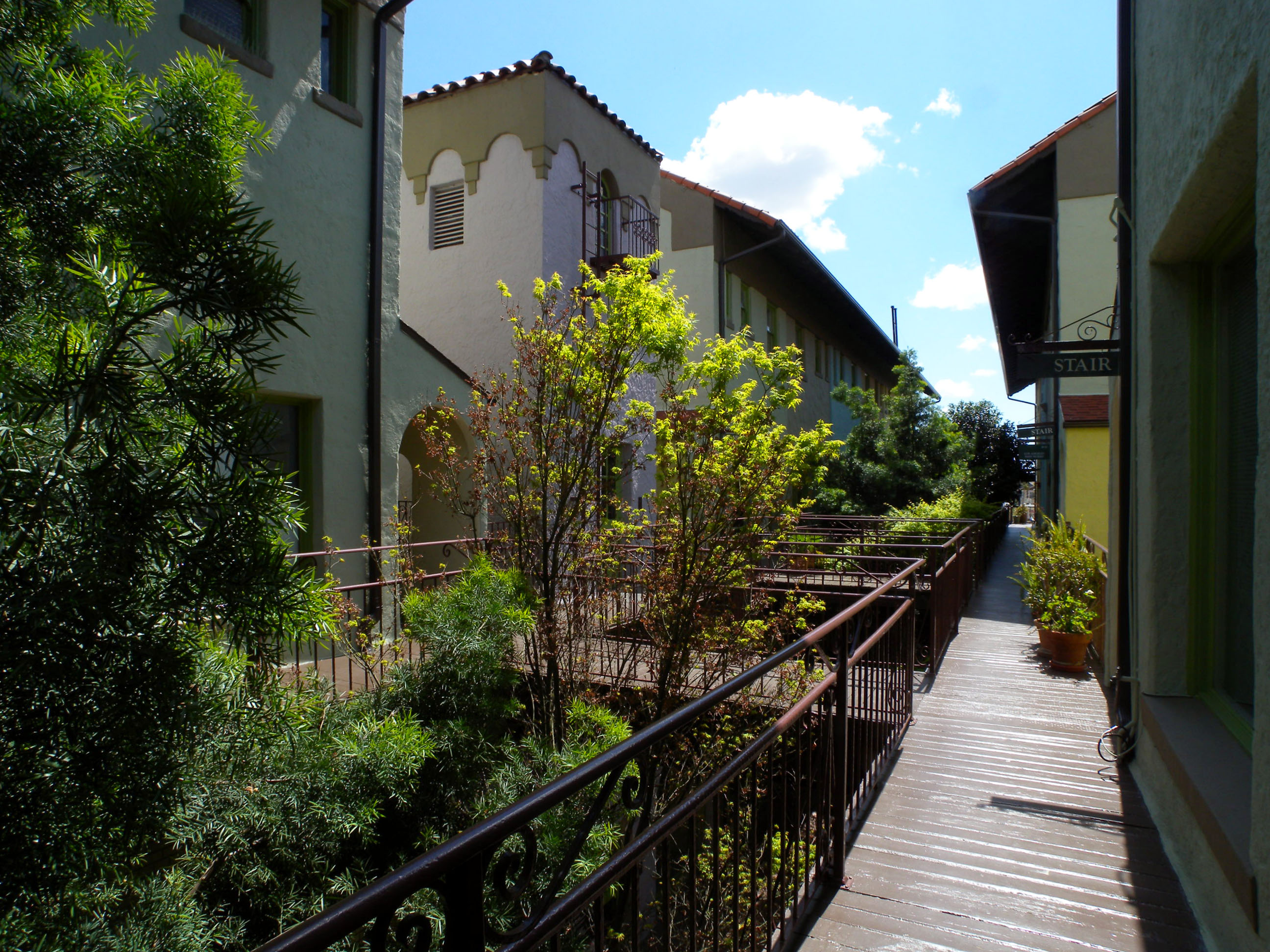
The Granada Buildings mezzanine level

== History ==
The project was designed by architect Franklin Harper with 42 suites combining offices and studios. Each unit had two levels, with office or shop space on the ground floor and living space on the second level or loft area. When Harper announced his plan in October 1927, the Los Angeles Times described the $1 million combined shop, studio and apartment structure as something entirely new in Los Angeles, resembling the design of European specialty shops. The apartments were located on the mezzanine level and consisted of kitchen, living room, bath and open porch.

== Design ==
The dominant feature of the Granada is the courtyard running between the four structures. The courtyards serve both a functional role as the paths to each of the suites and an aesthetic role as a garden area providing shade. One architectural textbook describes the exterior space as the dominant organizing theme for the building, giving the complex "all the attributes of the traditional narrow commercial street."

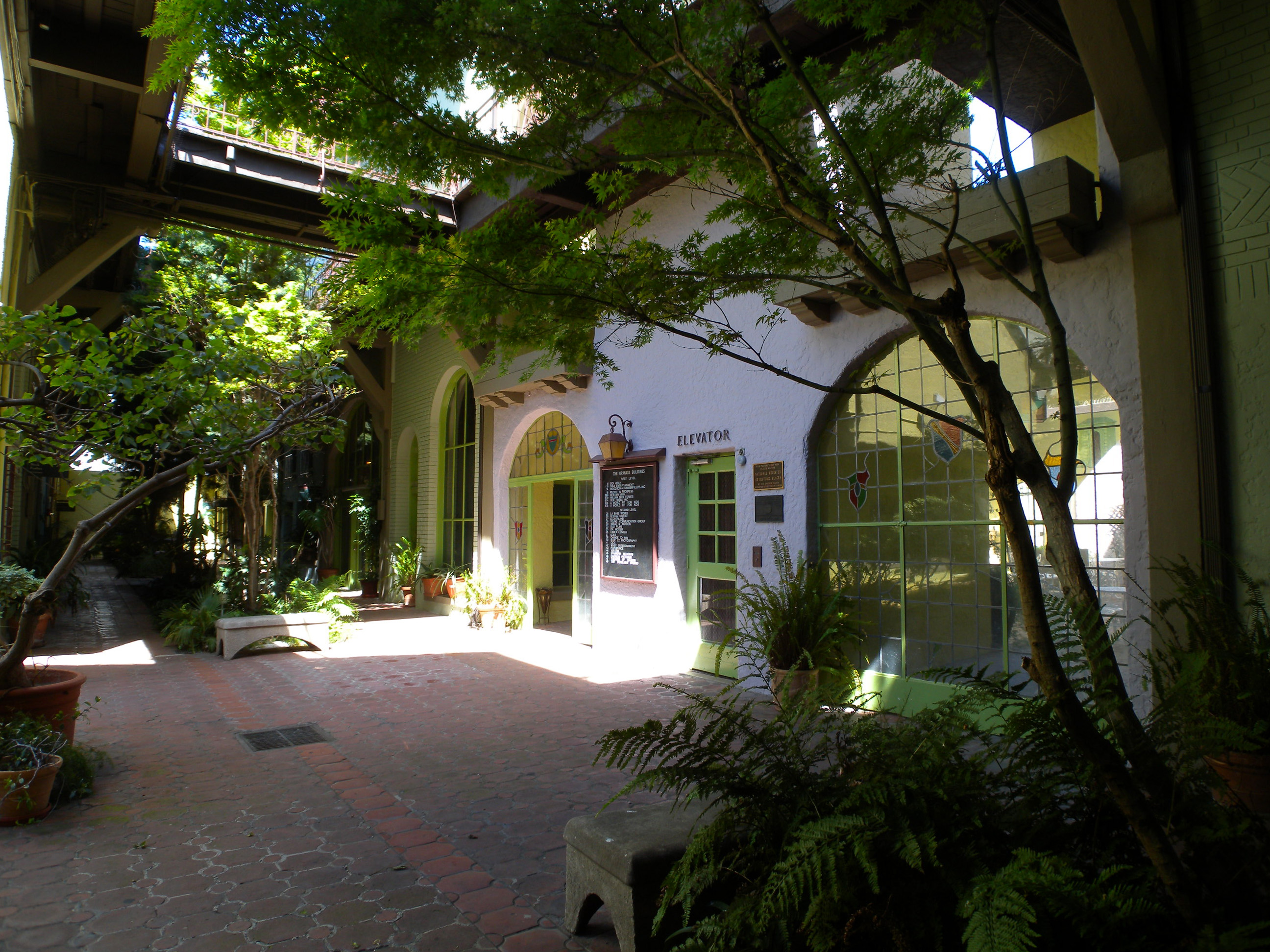
The Granada Buildings courtyard

The beauty of the Granada has attracted architects, artists, and urban planners from its earliest days. Gregory Ain and James Garrott shared office space here before World War II. George Hurrell, a noted Hollywood portrait photographer, lived and worked in Suite 9, photographing silent film stars in his office at the Granada. In the Princeton Architectural Press' 1997 book, "Courtyard Housing," the authors described the Granda as follows:

The Granada Buildings have attained an almost mythical quality in the Los Angeles design world, as architects, graphic designers, and artists have made them their homes. The court is one of the monuments of southern California architecture and one that contains the seeds of an urban existence whose promise was never fulfilled.

== Preservation and media ==
In 1980, noted Los Angeles Times columnist Jack Smith referred to the structure as "the lovely old Spanish-style Granada Building." Later renamed the Granada Buildings, the complex was purchased and restored by the Shidler Group in the late 1980s and received a preservation award from the Los Angeles Conservancy. In 2003, the complex was named the "Best Nonprofit Enclave" by LA Weekly. The Granada received the award due to the concentration of non-profits having offices there, including PEN Center USA, Theatre of Hearts, and People in Progress. LA Weekly noted at the time: "Creative people are drawn to the Granada because of its fascinating history, charming architecture, old-school elevator and lovely courtyard: a gorgeous garden with flowing fountains along the walkways, a taste of the Alhambra a short stroll away from picturesque but gritty MacArthur Park."

The complex was designated a Historic Cultural Monument (HCM # 238) by the Los Angeles Cultural Heritage Commission in April 1981. It was listed in the National Register of Historic Places in 1986.

The Granada is one of several Registered Historic Places encircling Lafayette Park, including the Bryson Apartment Hotel, The Town House, the Felipe De Neve Branch library, and Bullocks Wilshire one block to the west.

== See also ==
- List of Los Angeles Historic-Cultural Monuments in the Wilshire and Westlake areas
- National Register of Historic Places listings in Los Angeles
- Historic image at Los Angeles Public Library, archived from the original on February 27, 2005
