= Christiane Robbins =

American director, media artist and scholar

Christiane Robbins is an American director, media artist, and scholar recognized for her post-disciplinary work in digital media, imaging, experimental video, design, and algorithmic aesthetics. She is a founding principal of Metropolitan Architectural Practice (MAP) and directs its research division, MAP Studio. She has long explored the intersections of media, technology, and spatial design. Using various forms of analytic research, her practice often probes the cultural substrates of algorithmic imaging, aesthetics, and artificial intelligence - focusing on the impact of emerging technologies such as virtual architectures and neo-ecologoes within our built environments.

== Early life and education ==
Born in New Jersey in the ambient era of signal-to-noise and moving progressively westward to the land of "stacked" legacies - California. Robbins earned her Master of Fine Arts (MFA) from the California Institute of the Arts (CalArts) in 1989 and a Bachelor of Science (BS) in 20th-Century Art and Art History, specializing in New Genres, from the University of Wisconsin. She also engaged in postgraduate studies at Harvard University's Museum Management Institute (MMI).

== Academic career ==
Robbins has held several academic positions, including: Professor at the University of Southern California (USC) where she directed the Matrix Program for Digital Inter-Media Arts. As Fellow at Stanford University she conducted research in digital media and intermedia arts. As Invited Member of USC's Norman Lear Center she contributed to interdisciplinary studies in media and society. Robbins has also served as Visiting Faculty at Mills College, San Francisco State University, and University of California, Berkeley.

== Artistic and professional practice ==
Robbins' media and visual arts practice extends across digital video, installation, and digital imaging, encompassing database aesthetics, speculative visualization, and experimental design.

Robbins' work has been exhibited at numerous institutions, including the Museum of Modern Art (MoMA), New York; Whitney Museum of American Art; Venice Biennale; São Paulo Biennial; Museum of Contemporary Art Tokyo; the National Museum of Modern and Contemporary Art Seoul; Georges Pompidou Center (Paris), and the Gwangju Biennale (co-curated by Seung H-Sang and Ai Weiwei). Additional exhibitions include the Museum of Contemporary Art, Sydney; MIT's List Visual Arts Center; the Pacific Film Archives, Berkeley; the Wexner Center for the Arts, Ohio; and the Yerba Buena Center for the Arts, San Francisco.

Her contributions to experimental media and film have been screened at international film festivals, including the Rotterdam Film Festival, Berlin Film Festival, Vigo Film Festival, and San Francisco International Film Festival (Award Winner, Best of Category).

Robbins' videos have been broadcast on PBS affiliates (KQED, KCET, WGBH, WNET) and Channel 4 in the UK.

=== Metropolitan Architectural Practice (MAP) and MAP Studio ===
Metropolitan Architectural Practice (MAP) is an architecture and research studio founded in 2005 by Katherine Lambert, AIA, IIDA, and Christiane Robbins. In 2012, the partners established MAP Studio to support expanded, post-disciplinary work at the intersection of architecture, media, and spatial research. Directed by Robbins, their projects range across built and unbuilt environments, adaptive reuse, environmental analysis, and cultural inquiry.

Since 2022, the studios’ work has increasingly engaged with synthetic considerations – examining how digital imaging systems, algorithmic processes, and machine vision shape architectural representation, spatial reasoning and beyond net-zero practices. Across this trajectory, MAP + MAP Studio integrate design with expository analysis, digital visualization, and research-driven inquiry, foregrounding sustainability, material ecologies, and socially responsive architectural practices.

==== This Future Has a Past ====
Robbins co-created This Future Has a Past, a multimedia architectural investigation into modernist architect Gregory Ain’s lost MoMA Exhibition House. The project was exhibited at the 15th Venice Architecture Biennale, titled Reporting from the Front, was held from May 28 to November 27, 2016. Curated by Chilean architect Alejandro Aravena, this collateral exhibition showcased architectural efforts that address issues such as inequality, sustainability, and housing crises.

This Future Has a Past was then curated by Cynthia Davidson, executive director of Anyone Corporation, as the inaugural ANYSPACE exhibition at the Center for Architecture, New York (2017) and was widely covered in the press, including The New York Times, Architectural Digest, Metropolis, The Architect's Newspaper, Artsy, and Archinect.

==== No Place Like Utopia ====
Robbins is Director and Producer on No Place Like Utopia, a documentary film exploring Gregory Ain, modernist principles, and political suppression in post-WWII America. The film features interviews with Emily Ain, David Byrne, Beatriz Colomina, Frank Gehry, Victor Jones, Thom Mayne, Wolf Prix, and Julius Shulman.

==== Topography of Chance ====
Topography of Chance, 2022, offers composite visualizations representing the explosion of accessible, generative AI platforms. It depicts a discrete moment in architectural practice – an instance of experimental modality. It proposes a position that is neither fixed nor predetermined, rather one that emerges via chance and contingency.

Topography of Chance premiered at the 2023 Venice Bienale. It is a media installation comprising hundreds of animated image sequences, created in collaboration with the emergent generative AI text-to-image processes, Stable Diffusion + DALL-E1.

==== Threshold of the Frontier ====
Created in response to the rapid advancements of generative AI, Threshold of the Frontier explores “the speed of thought” and the dualities of visual seduction and the unforeseen challenges posed by artificial intelligence and its corollaries. Drawing on concepts akin to those of Jean Baudrillard, Delueze and Guttari, Shannon Vallor, and Paul Virilio, the work visualizes AI's dromological effects — how the velocity of algorithmic generation disrupts conventions of architectural, visual media and design practices, creating new thresholds for understanding spatiality and the built environment.

Threshold of the Frontier was first publicly introduced in Generative AI on the Dissecting Table at the College Art Association of America (CCA) 113th Annual Conference in 2025.

==== Telesis House v2.0 (Napa, CA) ====
Telesis House v2.0 is the restoration of a mid-century landmark by Jack Hillmer, recognized for Cultural Historical Significance (2014) and featured in Dwell and the Wall Street Journal. It was the recipient of the 2015 Fine Homebuilding Houses Award and a Napa County Landmarks 2020 Award of Merit.

== Collaborations and curatorial work ==
Robbins worked as art director and researcher with Marlon Riggs on Color Adjustment (1992) which received the 1992 Peabody Award for International Documentary of the Year. She collaborated with Max Almy on Perfect Leader (1983) and Leaving the Twentieth Century (1981/82), assisted Bill Viola on the feature-length video I Do Not Know What It Is That I Am, and worked as production designer on Marlon Riggs' Anthem (1991).

Robbins co-directed one of the first international cultural projects webcast on the Internet, On-Line Against AIDS which integrated visual art, installation, performance, and media/technology in response to the Sixth International Conference on AIDS. She was also co-director for X-Factor, an early online conference addressing independent media practice.

Robbins' curatorial work includes serving as co-director of New Langton Arts where a notable production was Adrian Piper's book from her video-photo-sonic installation Black Box White Box, which interrogates issues of racism and stereotypes. Robbins also served as the Director of the National Endowment for the Arts (NEA) Regional Regranting Program for Artist Fellowships, and Associate Curator for the Art Museum Association of America. At the San Francisco Art institute, Robbins was the co-director of the San Francisco Art Institute's Artist Committee (1990–93) organizing symposiums and exhibitions bringing together artists, academics, scientists, writers, engineers and cyber-hackers to consider the practice and theory of technology-based art and the emerging field of virtual reality. Symposia and exhibitions during this time included: Transactions in the Post-Industrial Era and The Voice of Citizenry, which featured theorists such as Fran Dyson, Thyrza Goodeve, Avital Ronell, and Sandy Stone; Culture Under Fire, Setting the Agenda for the ‘90s; Mass Media, Virtual Reality & the Persian Gulf War: A Symposium Investigating Recent Applications & Implications of the Artificial Reality Technology; Desire, Power, Technology: The Technologized Body; and David Cannon Dashiell's Adaline Kent Award Exhibition.

Robbins was Co-organizer of the USC/MIT Biannual Conference Race in Digital Space with Anna Everett, Henry Jenkins, and Tara McPherson. She was Executive Producer, Creative Director and Curator for the Art in Motion (AIM) Festival for Time-Based Media 1999–2002, an international digital media showcase. Under her tutelage, AIM partnered with the Museum of Contemporary Art Los Angeles, the Santa Monica Museum of Art and numerous cultural venues throughout the Los Angeles region. In 2002 she selected Isaac Julien and B. Ruby Rich as Keynote speakers for AIM's Luna Park Festival at the Museum of Contemporary Art Los Angeles.

== Awards and honors ==
Robbins has received awards, grants and fellowships, including a Graham Foundation Grant, the Sundance Institute's Independent Producer's Lab, a Banff Co-Production Fellowship, a City of Los Angeles (COLA) Fellowship, a SFMoMA SECA Award Video Commission (1992), and a Women in Design International Award (First Place).

Robbins has been awarded funding from the National Endowment for the Arts, Film Arts Foundation, Lannan Foundation, Hewlett Foundation, Andy Warhol Foundation, and Rockefeller Foundation.

MAP Studio's Sugar Loaf Ridge project in Napa, CA was selected for at the 2023 Architizer A+ Awards in the Sustainability Category.

== Collections ==
Robbins' works are part of the following public and private collections: Museum of Modern Art (MoMA), New York; The Kitchen, NYC; Banff Centre for the Arts; Stedelijk Museum, Amsterdam; Getty Museum, Los Angeles; Pacific Film Archives, Berkeley; San Francisco Museum of Modern Art (SFMoMA); Virginia Museum of Fine Arts, Richmond; Honolulu Museum of Art; Stanford University's Cantor Arts Center; the Corning Museum of Glass; and the California Institute of the Arts.

== Critical reception and publications ==
Robbins' work has been reviewed in major publications, including: Artforum, Artsy, Architectural Digest, Archinect,^{[25]} The New York Times, The Wall Street Journal, Dwell, Los Angeles Times, i-D Magazine, and Domus.

Robbins has also contributed writings on architectural imaging, digital media, speculative design, and artificial intelligence to various journals and media platforms. A forthcoming book: Architecture X Architecture: A Dialectic (ORO Editions) will be published in 2025.

== Recent work ==
Robbins' current research focuses on forensic research and algorithmic aesthetics through Jetztzeit (The Space Between Zero and One), a studio investigating visual culture, AI, and geo-locative installations.
