= Katherine Lambert =

American architect and author

Katherine Lambert, AIA is an American architect, educator, and writer recognized for her cross-disciplinary approach to architecture and design practices, integrating media, culture, history, and emerging technologies. She is a professor of architecture at California College of the Arts (CCA), where she has pioneered research in inclusive design, adaptive reuse, and speculative spatial practices. Her work spans academic research, built projects, and exhibitions, and has been widely published and exhibited internationally. Lambert is also the founding principal of MAP (Metropolitan Architectural Practice) and MAP Studio, and was a founding partner of FACE (Forum for Architecture + Creative Engagement).

== Education ==
Lambert earned a Bachelor of Science from the University of Minnesota, focusing on Interior Architecture and the History of Architecture, before pursuing graduate studies in the Master of Architecture II Program at the University of California, Los Angeles (UCLA).

== Academic career ==
As a professor of architecture at California College of the Arts (CCA) Lambert has contributed to curriculum development, research, and faculty leadership, including serving on the CCA Executive Committee (2023–26), the Appointments, Promotion, and Tenure Committee (2019–21), and chairing the Interior Architecture program (2005–2012).

Lambert has been invited to lecture and exhibit at institutions including Goldsmiths' College University of London, the Royal College of Art (RCA), Center for Architecture NYC, Venice Biennale, Dwell on Design, Palm Springs Modernism, the College Art Association, and San Jose State University.

== Professional Practice ==
=== FACE Architecture, Design + Graphics (1990–2003) ===
As founding principal of FACE (Forum for Architecture + Creative Engagement) Lambert led commercial, residential, and cultural projects, blending digital media, architectural preservation, and urbanism. During this period she published an article, Dirt Manifesto, in Architecture Magazine. It was cited as "a bellwether call to the architectural profession to meld and prioritize progressive design principles with sustainable practices".

==== Notable projects ====
===== Quokka Sports =====
Quokka Sports was a San Francisco-based digital media company specializing in immersive online coverage of adventure and outdoor sports. Sportico writes "Quokka and Macromedia, had a big impact on the dynamic nature of the web. Macromedia worked with Netscape to create the plugin model to allow for more video and audio, and Macromedia recruited Quokka as a content provider partner to show what was possible." This adaptive reuse of a former textile factory was noted for "creating an environment that was pretty cool—this exposed brick building with large steel beams, and these really cool wood desk setups with sail cloths as the partitions. And it wasn’t just sail cloth, it was the latest, newest, coolest sailing cloth with all these fibers embedded in it, just the right color, slightly yellow. It had a great tech vibe to it, and Al, the CEO, sat right in the middle."

===== Tenderloin AIDS Resource Center (TARC) =====
Established in 1990 as the Tenderloin AIDS Network by activists Hank Wilson, Glenda Hope, and Dennis Conkin, TARC emerged in response to the escalating HIV/AIDS crisis within the Tenderloin district. FACE's adaptive reuse of a storefront for TARC's headquarters was featured in Architectural Record, Metropolis, and Progressive Architecture. Lambert's TARC Book was distributed by Printed Matter & The Dia Foundation and is in the permanent collections of the Smithsonian Institution and the Getty Library.

===== One Grant Avenue =====
Constructed in 1910 as the Savings Union Bank, One Grant Avenue was designed by architects Walter Danforth Bliss and William Baker Faville. The building showcases a Beaux-Arts style with a steel frame clad in gray granite and its façade is distinguished by six Ionic columns supporting a massive pedimental sculpture, which houses a bas-relief of Liberty by Haig Patigian. The Savings Union Bank was designated a San Francisco Landmark in 1981. In the 1990s, FACE's adaptive reuse efforts converted the former bank into a retail space while preserving its historic architectural elements.

===== S.I. Naphtaly House =====
Built in 1913, the Samuel L. Naphtaly House showcases the early 20th century architect Willis Polk's adaptation of Spanish city architecture, featuring a stucco exterior and a central courtyard. It is the first of three houses built by Polk on San Francisco's Gold Coast that share a common plan configuration: a U-shaped courtyard that wraps around a central courtyard. FACE's adaptive reuse retained Willis Polk's plan and included a new domed mechanical skylight, squash court, lap pool, elevator, and garage.

===== Sonoma Ranch Compound =====
FACE's Sonoma Ranch Compound was one of the earliest sustainable residences in Northern California. The design of the ranch is rooted in the local tradition of the Sonoma adobes, specifically the Rancho Petaluma Adobe, built by General Mariano G. Vallejo in the mid-19th century.

This 300 acre ranch in Sonoma comprises main residence built of rammed earth and straw bale construction methodologies designed to "reflect the natural, cultural and historical aspects of its setting, but in a contemporary way." The work "began by installing a forge, cabinetry and masonry workshops on the site. From these, nearly all the materials used to construct the two-story residence emerged - rammed earth countertops and tiles, cabinetry hardware and hand-forged iron doors, mica lamps and cast stone sink bowls...It is constructed of steel-reinforced rammed earth, a mixture of 30 percent concrete and 70 percent dirt taken from the site. Fallen bay and madrone trees were milled and crafted into cabinetry and flooring. Redwood beams and rafters came from a century-old bridge that had been disassembled."

=== Metropolitan Architectural Practice and MAP Studio ===
Lambert, along with Christiane Robbins, founded Metropolitan Architectural Practice (MAP) in 2003 and MAP Studio in 2012, focusing on adaptive reuse, sustainable and research-driven design practices. Projects include residential and commercial architecture across San Francisco, Los Angeles, and Napa, such as Esprit Park Studio, a bio-tech headquarters, tech start-ups, and the Architizer A+ Award-winning Berrelleza Sustainability Research Center Masterplan.

==== Notable projects ====
===== Telesis House v2.0 (Napa, CA) =====
Restoration, remediation, and renovation of a mid-century landmark home by Jack Hillmer, recognized for Cultural Historical Significance (2014) and featured in Dwell and the Wall Street Journal. Recipient of the 2015 Fine Homebuilding Houses Award and Napa County Landmarks 2020 Award of Merit.

===== PCH International U.S. Headquarters =====
MAP repurposed a landmark building that previously held the Bay Area Guardian into a multi story global headquarters for PCH International in San Francisco's tech hub. The original concrete and steel finishes were complimented with painted steel, white oak, and glass elements. Redesigned interiors include "state-of-the-art prototyping laboratories, naturally lighted work stations, conference, and training rooms, and a presentation hall outfitted with advanced interactive teleconferencing, audio visual and lighting infrastructure".

===== Adaptive reuse =====
MAP's application of adaptive reuse practices at the Regency Center/Scottish Right Temple and the San Francisco Opera House offices transformed historic interiors for administrative and creative use.

== Cross-disciplinary Media, Research and Exhibitions ==
=== This Future Has a Past ===
Lambert co-created This Future Has a Past, a multimedia architectural investigation into modernist architect Gregory Ain’s lost MoMA Exhibition House which was exhibited at the 15th Venice Architecture Biennale (2016). Curated by Chilean architect Alejandro Aravena, this collateral exhibition showcased served as "a call to action, urging architects and the public to engage with the critical challenges of our time through innovative and socially conscious design".

This Future Has a Past was then curated by Cynthia Davidson, executive director of Anyone Corporation, as the inaugural ANYSPACE exhibition at the Center for Architecture, New York (2017) and was widely covered in the press, including The New York Times, Architectural Digest, Metropolis, The Architect's Newspaper, Artsy, and Archinect.

=== No Place Like Utopia ===
Lambert is an Executive Producer on No Place Like Utopia, a documentary film exploring Gregory Ain, modernist principles, and political suppression in post-WWII America. The film includes interviews with Emily Ain, David Byrne, Beatriz Colomina, Frank Gehry, Victor Jones, Thom Mayne, Wolf Prix, and Julius Shulman.

== Publications and Writing ==
Lambert's critical writings on architecture, digital imaging, and adaptive reuse and coverage of her work have appeared in leading publications, including The New York Times,. Architectural Record, Architectural Digest, Architecture, Dwell, Forward AIA, i-D magazine, Leonardo Electronic Almanac, Metropolis, Progressive Architecture, Parallax, and the Wall Street Journal,

Lambert's TARC Book was distributed by Printed Matter & The Dia Foundation and is in the permanent collections of the Smithsonian Institution and the Getty Library.

Lambert's book Architecture X Architecture: A Dialectic (ORO Editions) will be released in 2025.

== Public Collections ==
Lambert's work is included in the permanent collections of the Smithsonian Institution, the Getty Library, the Cooper Hewitt Smithsonian Design Museum, the Canadian Centre for Architecture, the Banff Centre for the Arts and Creativity, the Dia Art Foundation, and the Whitney Museum of American Art.

== Awards and Fellowships ==
- International Design Awards (2014) for Napa Residence.
- Graham Foundation Grant (2018) for This Future Has a Past.
- IDECF Leibrock Fellowship for Universal Design (2019).
- Napa County Landmarks Board Award of Merit (2020) for Telesis House v2.0.
- Architizer A+ Awards (2023) – Sustainability Category, Sugar Loaf Ridge, Napa, CA.
