= Lester Oliver Bankhead =

American architect (1912–1997)

- Born: April 20, 1912; Union, South Carolina, U.S.
- Died: 1997; Los Angeles, California, U.S.
- Education: UCLA Extension, Otis Art Institute, Los Angeles City College, Los Angeles Trade–Technical College
- Alma mater: Voorhees University
- Occupation: Architect
- Known for: Architecture in Los Angeles in the 1950s
- Spouse: Mary Wright
- Children: 2

Lester Oliver Bankhead (1912–1997), was an American architect, known for his modernist church designs. In the 1950s, he was a pioneering Black architect in Los Angeles, California. His architecture firm went by the names Bankhead's Building Design Services, and later as Lester O. Bankhead Design Group.

== Early life ==
Lester Oliver Bankhead was born on April 20, 1912, in Union, South Carolina. He was born to parents Pearl Eugenia Eskew and John Hayes Bankhead, and was the eldest of six children. His mother was a teacher and had attended Tuskegee Institute (now Tuskegee University); his father was a farmer and a minister. His early education was in a one-room Rosenwald School where his mother taught in Cherokee County, South Carolina. He may have also attended Sims High School in Union.

He had wanted to attend Tuskegee Institute like his mother, however he couldn't afford to do so. Instead he enrolled in 1937 at Voorhees University in Denmark, South Carolina; and was able to support his education with work as a barber. He graduated (from Voorhees) with a degree in agriculture and a certificate (1941) in carpentry. Because of his drafting abilities, Bankhead was given opportunities to assist drafting instructors.

In 1942 during World War II, he was drafted to the United States Army where he served in Casablanca. He was discharged from the military in 1945, and moved to Los Angeles. In 1946, Bankhead married Mary Wright and together they had two daughters.

== Career ==
Bankhead opened a barber shop after arriving in Los Angeles, "Bankhead's Barbershop". He continued his education after the war at the extension program at University of California, Los Angeles (UCLA), Otis Art Institute, Los Angeles City College, and Los Angeles Trade–Technical College. Bankhead tried to work with architect Paul Revere Williams, but he was rejected for being too skilled for an entry level role.

He briefly worked with Roab Construction Company. By the 1950s, Bankhead had his own architecture firm, and one of his earliest works was an apartment building on Washington Boulevard. In 1962, Bankhead received a contractors license from the California Contractors State License Board. His main focus was church design, but he also created homes including homes for celebrities. He was a mentor for some forty African American architects in their early careers.

Bankhead died in 1997 in Los Angeles. He was interviewed in 1989 and 1990 by Wesley H. Henderson and is part of the UCLA Oral History Program archives. Bankhead 's profile was included in the biographical dictionary African American Architects: A Biographical Dictionary, 1865–1945 (2004).

== Works ==
- Chapel of Faith Baptist Church, 7931 San Pedro Street, Los Angeles, California
- Greater Life Missionary Church, Los Angeles, California
- New Jerusalem Missionary Baptist Church (now Greater New Jerusalem Baptist), 4927 South Western Avenue, Los Angeles, California
- Miracle Baptist Church, Los Angeles, California
- Trinity Baptist Church, Los Angeles, California
- United Revelation Church in God, Los Angeles, California

== See also ==
- African-American architects
- James Homer Garrott
