= Bar sinister (disambiguation) =

Bar sinister is a colloquial term in heraldry.

Bar sinister may also refer to:

- Simon Bar Sinister, the Underdog character
- Boardner's, a bar which holds a party of this name
- The Bar Sinister, a film
