= Wesley Henderson =

American architect

Wesley Howard Henderson
- Born: September 22, 1951; Troy, Ohio, U.S.
- Other names: Wes Henderson
- Education: Massachusetts Institute of Technology, University of California, Los Angeles
- Occupation(s): Architect, educator, and historian

Wesley Howard Henderson (born 1951), is an American architect, educator, and historian. He is an assistant professor at the Robert R. Taylor School of Architecture and Construction Science at Tuskegee University, and is a member of the American Institute of Architects (AIA), and the National Organization of Minority Architects (NOMA). Particularly notable is Henderson's dissertation on Paul Revere Williams, celebrated as the most in-depth examination of the career of Williams, a prominent and celebrated African American architect.

== Early life and education ==
Wesley Howard Henderson was born on September 22, 1951, in Troy, Ohio. Henderson received both his Bachelor of Science degree in Architectural Design with a minor in History (1974) and his Master of Architecture degree (1976) from Massachusetts Institute of Technology. He received his Ph.D. in Architectural History from the University of California, Los Angeles in 1992. His dissertation, “Two Case Studies of African-American Architects' Careers in Los Angeles, 1890-1945” maps the careers of two Los-Angeles based architects, Paul Revere Williams and James Garrott, looking beyond their projects to analyze their careers and their connection with the African American community. In doing so, Henderson gives primary focus to the role of racial identity in the architectural career path and in subsequent success.

== Career ==
Henderson became a registered architect in Texas in 1981. He taught at Prairie View A&M University as assistant professor of architecture from 1976 to 1978 and as associate professor from 1983 to 1986. He also taught at the University of Texas at Austin, Texas A&M University, and Florida A&M University.

Henderson is currently teaching at Tuskegee University, where he researches a diverse range of topics spanning from Art Deco buildings, World Fairs, industrial construction in the rural South, and more.

Henderson has been the principal of his namesake practice located in Dallas, Texas since 2003.

== Publications ==
- Henderson, Wesley H. (1992). African-American Architects in Los Angeles: Lester O. Bankhead. University of California, Los Angeles; University of California, Los Angeles Oral History Program, Lester Oliver Bankhead. Regents of the University of California.
- Henderson, Wesley H. (1992). Two Case Studies of African-American Architects' Careers in Los Angeles, 1890-1945: Paul R. Williams, FAIA and James H. Garrott, AIA (dissertation). University of California, Los Angeles.
- Wilson, Dreck Spurlock, ed. (2004). African American Architects: A Biographical Dictionary, 1865–1945. Wesley Henderson (associate editor), Simmona Simmons-Hodo (associate editor). New York City, NY: Routledge. ISBN 9781135956295.

== See also ==
- African-American architects
