= Ben Margolis =

American lawyer

Ben Margolis (April 23, 1910 – January 27, 1999) was an American attorney, best known for defending the Hollywood Ten and the Sleepy Lagoon murder suspects and for helping to draft the United Nations Charter.

== Career ==
Margolis was born in New York, the son of Socialists who fled persecution of Jews in their native Russia. His family moved west to Santa Barbara, Calif., when he was a teenager. He attended Hastings Law School in California, opening a practice in San Francisco in 1933.

Margolis had a law partnership for half a century with John T. McTernan.

In the early years of the Second Red Scare Margolis testified before the House Committee on Un-American Activities (HUAC) on September 30, 1952, and refused to answer questions or name names. He told the committee that he had "no intention of becoming one of your stool pigeons," and he told them that they had "terrorized ... the people of the United States."

== Personal life ==
Margolis commissioned a noteworthy home by architect Gregory Ain which was built by his partner James Garrott in 1951. The two architects had been partners for 11 years at the time, and were alternately "Garrott & Ain" or "Ain & Garrott," depending on who was responsible for design, while on other projects they simply assisted each other's solo work without credit.

Ain drew the preliminary drawings for the Margolis house in February 1951, but as Garrott later recalled Ain "got cold feet because of the McCarthy hearings." Garrott took over the project, executed the working drawings, and supervised the construction. Garrott is the only architect named on the original building permits and also the only architect named in a 2004 book titled African American Architects, but Ben Margolis' son Ken, who was ten years old at the time the house was built, knew Ain to be the architect.

== Additional Sources ==
- University of California, Special Collections (1984). "Law and Social Conscience, Ben Margolis". Interview with Margolis conducted by Michael S. Balter. Available online here; also available online here.
- 1946 photo of Ben Margolis at Los Angeles Public Library Photo Collection
