= Cherokee Building =

Building in Los Angeles, California, U.S.

- U.S. Historic district – Contributing property
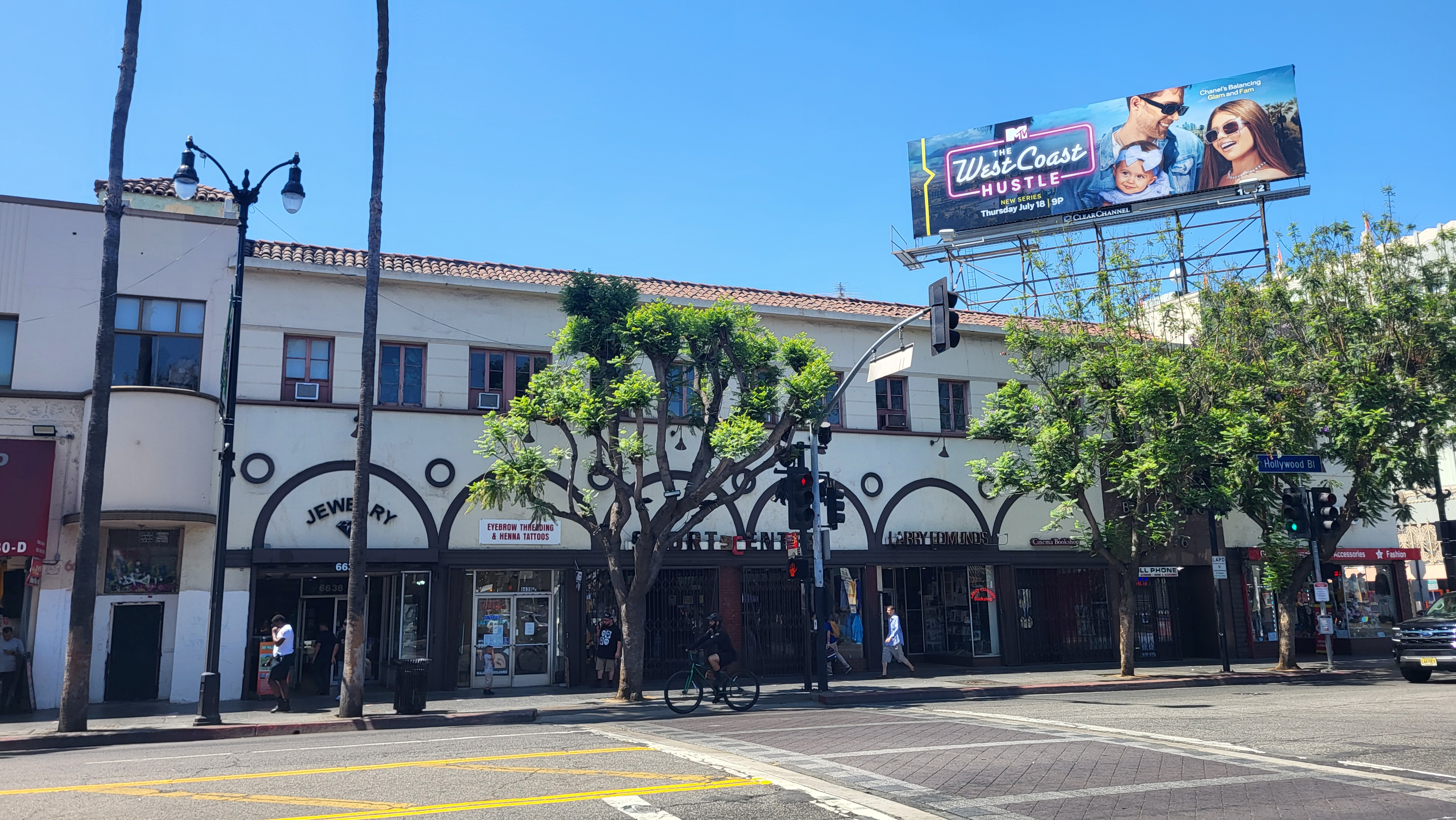
- The building in 2024

- Location within the Los Angeles metropolitan area
- Location: 6630 W. Hollywood Blvd. and 1652 N. Cherokee Ave., Hollywood, California
- Coordinates: 34.1015°N 118.3344°W
- Built: 1927
- Architect: Norman W. Alpaugh
- Architectural style: Spanish Colonial Revival
- Part of: Hollywood Boulevard Commercial and Entertainment District (ID85000704)
- Designated CP: April 4, 1985

Cherokee Building is a historic two-story commercial structure located at 6630 W. Hollywood Boulevard and 1652 N. Cherokee Avenue in Hollywood, California.

== History ==
Cherokee Building was built by Norman W. Alpaugh in 1929 and features a Spanish Colonial Revival design. The building, which housed Hollywood's first drive-in businesses, catered to the automobile by having a large motor entrance at the rear where motorists could park and enter, rather than entering from the street.

One of Cherokee Building's original tenants was a hair salon that acted as a front for a Prohibition-era illegal card club and gambling speakeasy. In the 1930s, Gene Austin opened a nightclub in the building, and that business was followed by several bars, including a gay bar. In 1944, the bar changed to Boardner's, whose name has remained ever since.

In 1938, Larry Edmunds Bookshop moved into one of the building's storefronts. In the 1960s and 70s, several clothing stores popular with rock musicians were located in this building.

In 1985, the Hollywood Boulevard Commercial and Entertainment District was added to the National Register of Historic Places, with Cherokee Building listed as a contributing property in the district.

== Architecture ==
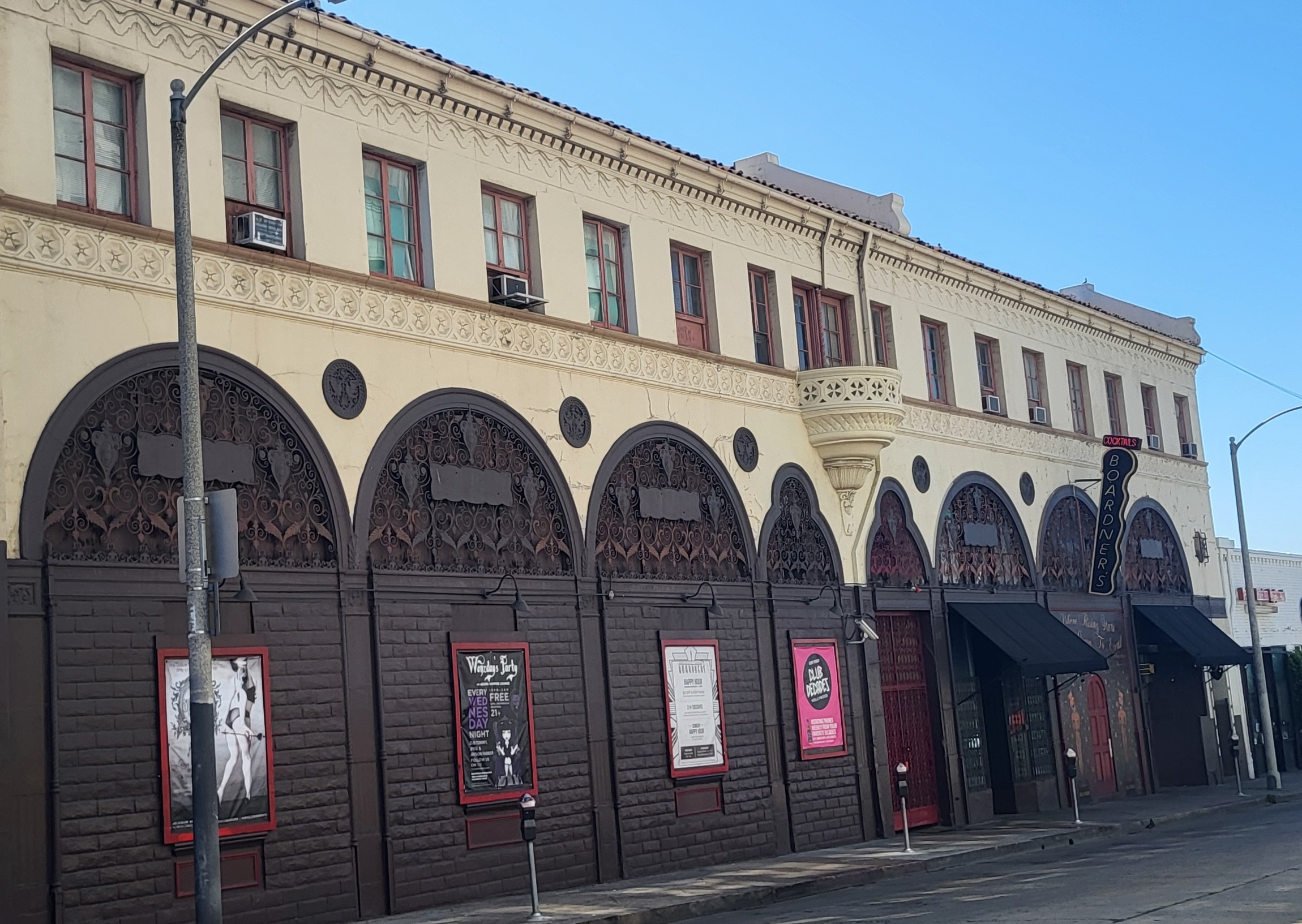
Cherokee Building from Cherokee Ave

Cherokee Building was built with concrete in an L-shaped configuration. The building features a Spanish Colonial Revival design, one that includes an elaborate stringcourse, a tiled roof, Moorish arches, a brick patio with a tiled fountain as its focal point, Churrigueresque and wrought iron ornamentation, and ornamental medallions.

== Filming location ==
Cherokee Building tenants Boardner's and Larry Edmunds Bookstore are popular film locations.

== See also ==
- List of contributing properties in the Hollywood Boulevard Commercial and Entertainment District
