= The Town House (Los Angeles) =

- U.S. National Register of Historic Places
- Los Angeles Historic-Cultural Monument
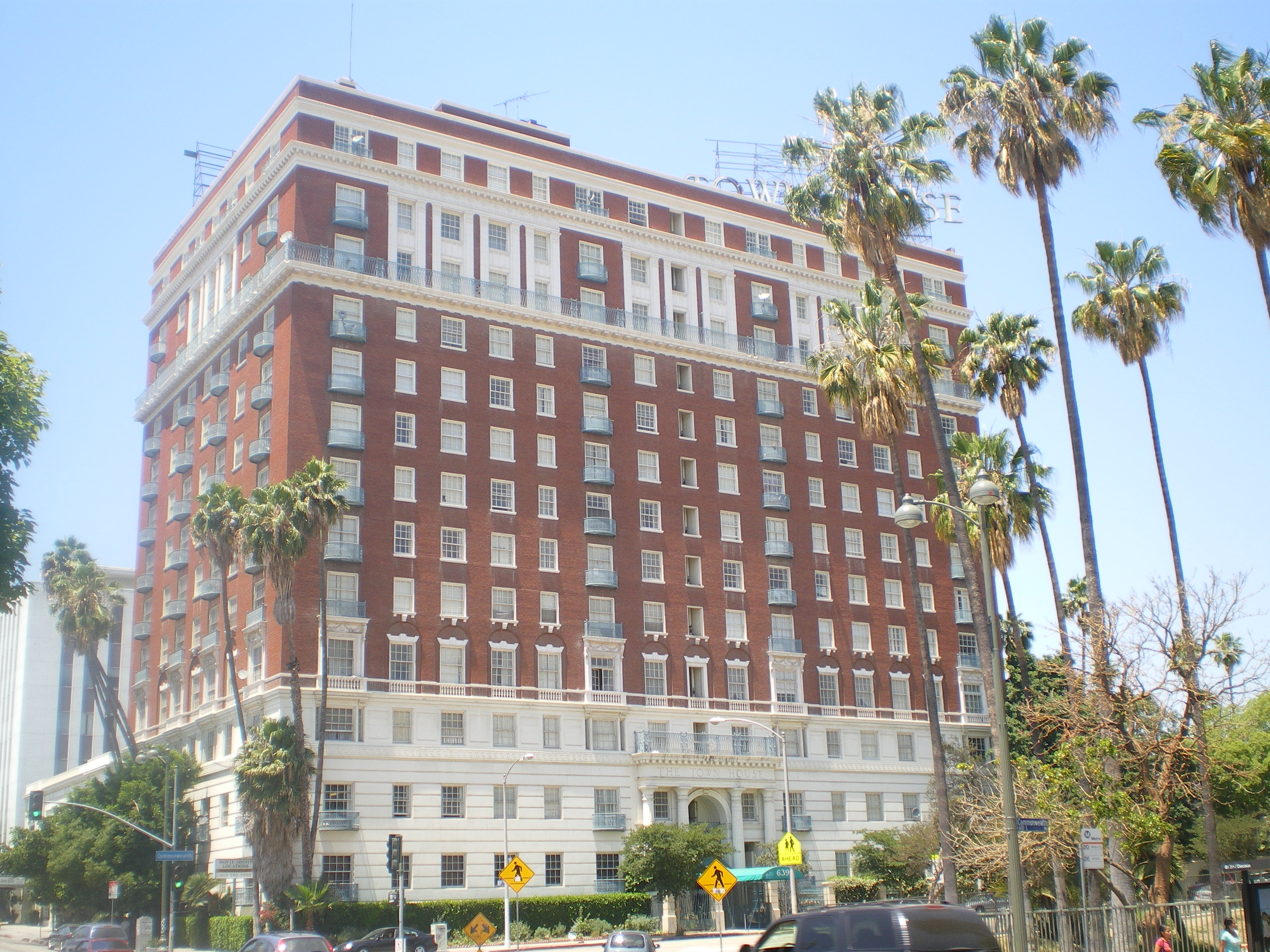
- The Town House in May 2008

- Location within the Los Angeles metropolitan area Location within California Location within the United States
- Location: 2959-2973 Wilshire Blvd. and 607-643 S. Commonwealth Ave., Los Angeles, California
- Coordinates: 34°3′44″N 118°17′5″W
- Built: 1929
- Architect: Norman W. Alpaugh
- Architectural style: Beaux Arts
- NRHP reference No.: 96000821
- LAHCM No.: 576

Significant dates
- Added to NRHP: December 15, 1997
- Designated LAHCM: 1994-04-07

The Town House is a large former hotel property built in 1929 on Wilshire Boulevard, adjacent to Lafayette Park in the Westlake district of Los Angeles, California. After a long career as a hotel it operates today as low income housing.

== History ==
The Town House was developed by oil magnate Edward Doheny as one of the most luxurious apartment-hotels in Southern California. Designed by Norman W. Alpaugh and built at a cost of $3 million, it opened on September 11, 1929. It is a very late example of the Beaux Arts style, with a brick and terra cotta facade with classical detailing. The Town House “ran into financial difficulties soon after completion of the building,” and “permits to sell stock were canceled by the state corporation department.” Under the reorganization plan for the Wilshire-Commonwealth Corporation, Ltd., creditors accepted stock in payment of the debts owed them. Being an "apartment hotel" for the affluent, its prominent residents then included Byron H. Canfield, board chairman of Scripps-Canfield newspapers. Financial troubles continued in the mid-1930s, when the Wilshire-Commonwealth Corporation sought reorganization in U.S. Court, being in debt to the Metropolitan Life Insurance firm for $720,000 in late 1934. On 10 July 1937 Metropolitan Life Insurance announced its sale of the property to Chicago-based Kirkeby Hotel Company for "approximately" one million dollars. The building was converted to operate exclusively as a hotel in 1937, featuring one of the most glamorous bars in the city, the Zebra Room, with interiors by noted designer Wayne McAllister.

A mid-1942 advertisement described the building's smallest and cheapest apartment units—renting at $185 monthly—as having "living room [with wood-burning fireplace], bedroom, kitchen, dinette, and bath." Amenities included room service from the building's restaurants, daily maid service, and access to the roof solarium, putting green, tennis court, and new outdoor swimming pool.

Conrad Hilton bought the Town House in 1942, paying owner Arnold Kirkeby $150,000 cash and assuming $830,000 of debt. Elizabeth Taylor celebrated her first marriage, to Hilton heir Conrad Hilton, Jr., at the hotel in 1950. The Town House was sold to Sheraton Hotels in 1954 and became the Sheraton-Town House. In 1958, Sheraton renamed the hotel the Sheraton-West Hotel. Sheraton sold the hotel to the Kyo-Ya group in 1972, although Sheraton retained management. In 1976, the hotel added four tennis courts at the rear of the enormous property, which covered nearly an entire city block. In 1978 the hotel's name reverted to the Sheraton-Town House. From the 1960s through the 1980s, the area around Lafayette Park became less desirable and more dangerous. After the 1992 Los Angeles Riots, the hotel finally closed in February 1993.

Just as it was about to be demolished, the property was purchased by developer Rob MacLeod. He enlisted the Santa Monica-based firm of Killefer Flammang Architects (KFA), noted for their renovations of historic buildings, to convert the 255-room hotel into 142 units of low-income housing, under a 55-year covenant. The building reopened in December 2001.

In 2017, the north half of the massive 1.8 acre property, containing the long-abandoned tennis courts and the hotel parking lot, was redeveloped by Century West Partners with the construction of a new 398-unit apartment complex, Next on Sixth, also designed by KFA. The Town House is currently owned by the Central Valley Coalition for Affordable Housing.

The Town House was designated a Los Angeles Historic-Cultural Monument in 1994 and was listed on the National Register of Historic Places, and in 1997. Other registered historic sites within one block of the Town House include the Bryson Apartment Hotel, Bullocks Wilshire, the Felipe de Neve branch of the Los Angeles Public Library system, and the Granada Shoppes and Studios.

== See also ==
- List of Los Angeles Historic-Cultural Monuments in the Wilshire and Westlake areas
- National Register of Historic Places listings in Los Angeles
