= Norman W. Alpaugh =

Canadian architect

- Born: September 1, 1885; Canada
- Died: November 15, 1954 (aged 69); Los Angeles, California, United States
- Occupation: Architect
- Spouse: Gertrude Belleau Sheetz
- Buildings: Park Wilshire Building; Cherokee Building; The Town House

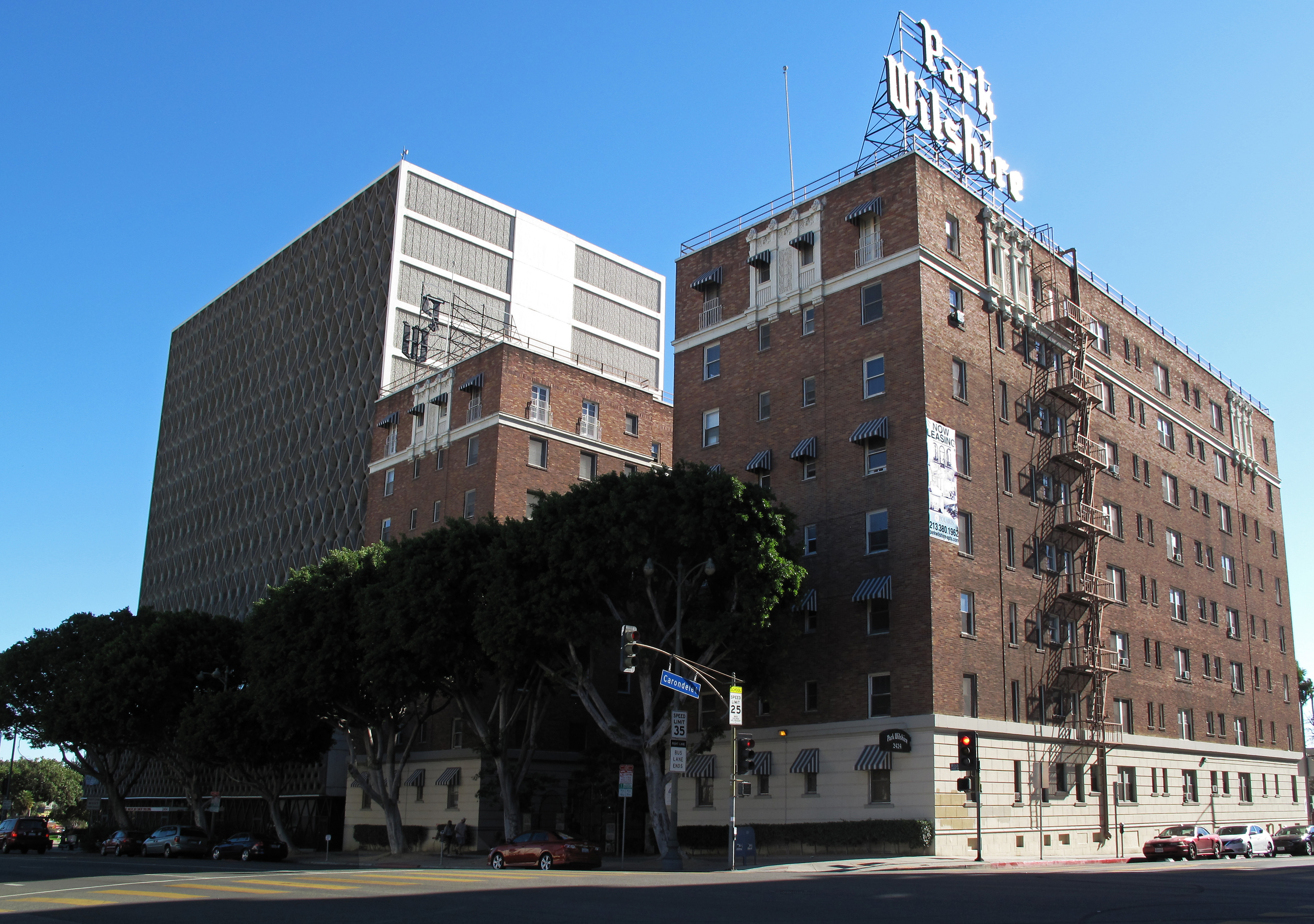
Park Wilshire Building

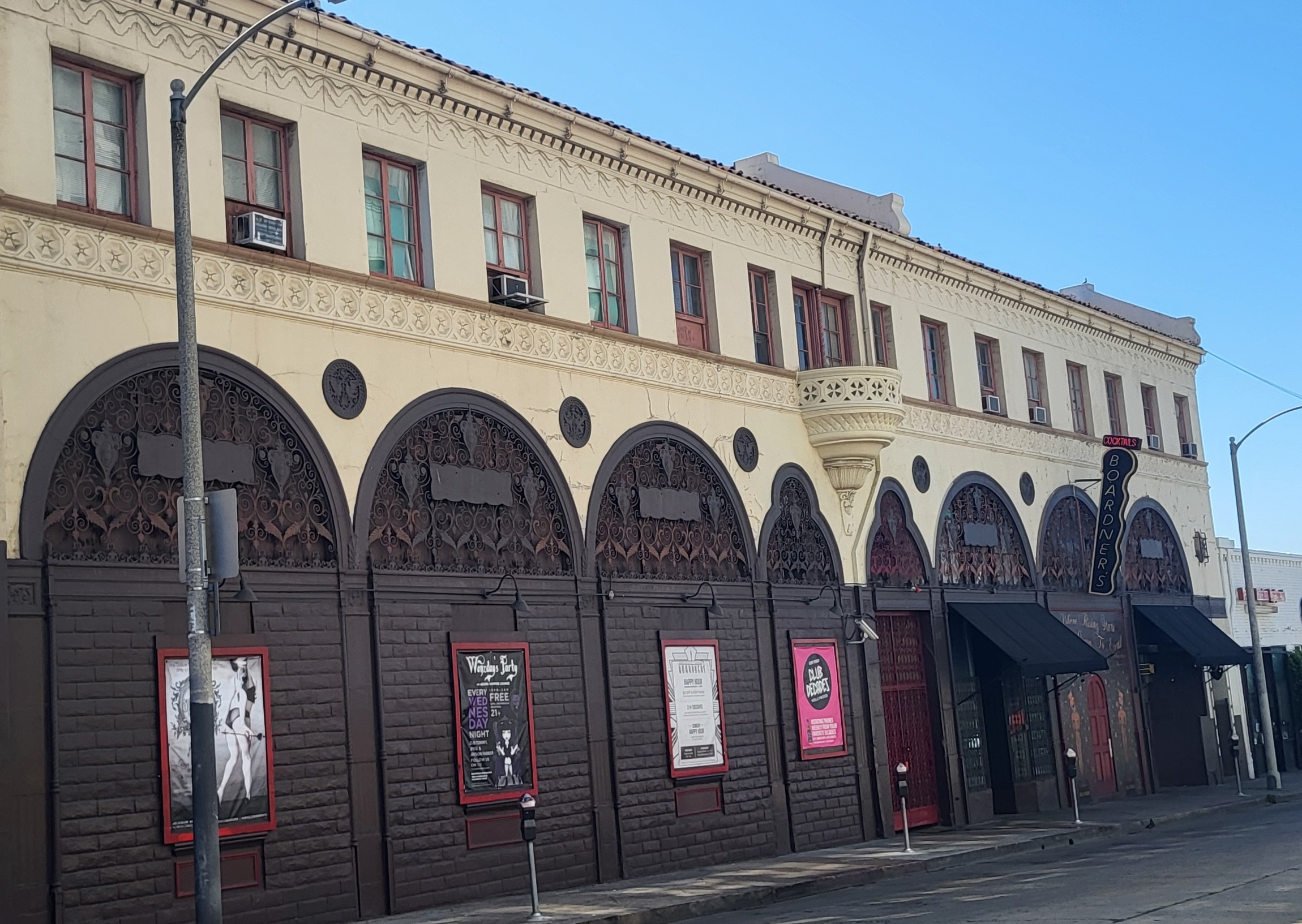
Cherokee Building

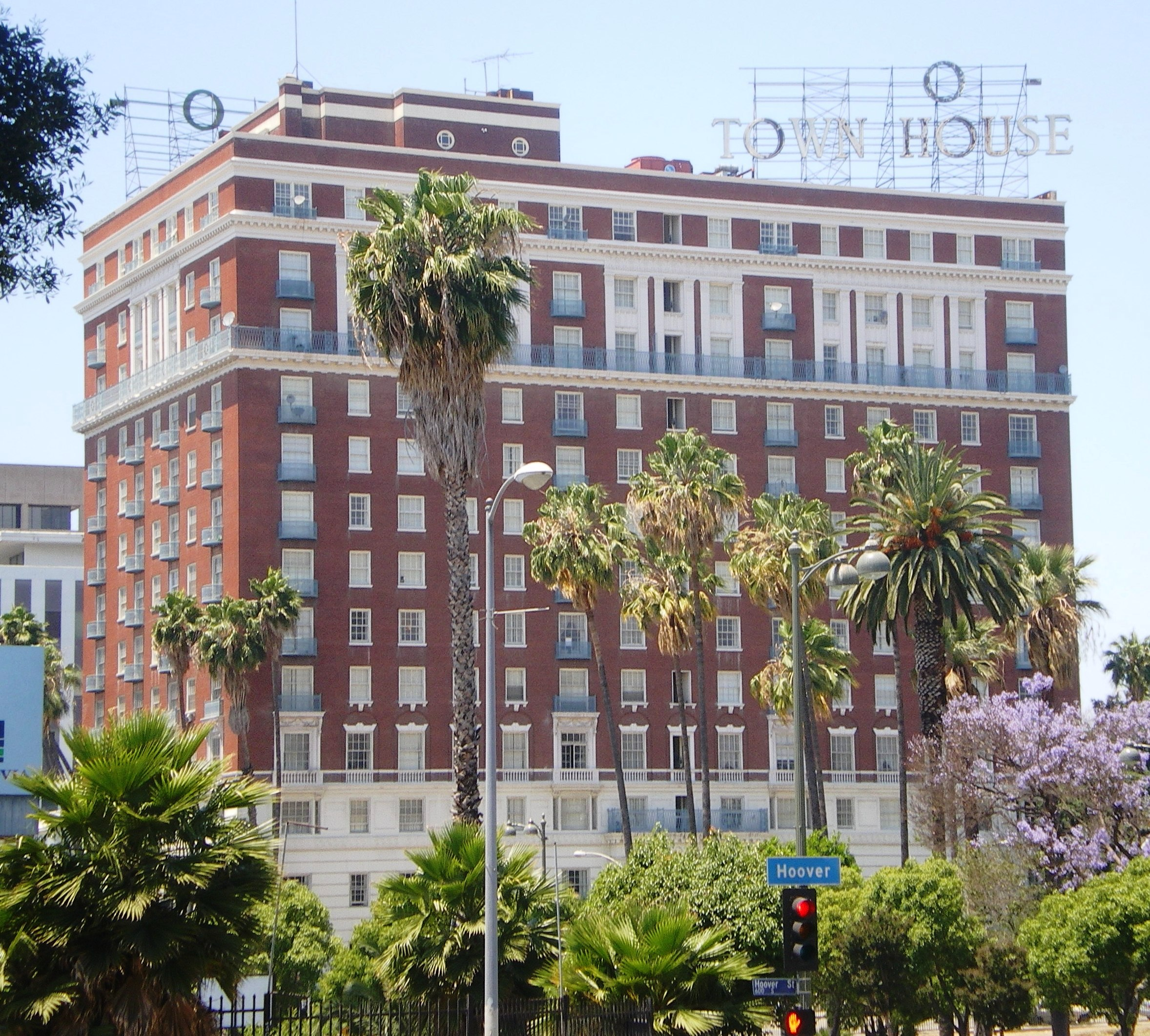
The Town House

Norman Walton Alpaugh (1885–1954) was a Canadian architect known for his work in and around Los Angeles, California.

== Biography ==
Norman Alpaugh was born on September 1, 1885, married Gertrude Belleau Sheetz in 1912, and died on November 15, 1954. He and his wife had at least one son, also named Norman Walton Alpaugh, born in 1914.

== Career ==
Norman Alpaugh began his career in Toronto in 1906, where he formed a partnership with Charles M. Willmot in 1909. In 1911, he worked briefly in Regina, Saskatchewan before moving to Los Angeles in 1912. He was a partner at Russell and Alpaugh in 1923.

== Notable buildings ==
Norman's notable works include:

=== In Los Angeles ===
- Temple Emanu-El Synagogue, 1919, 1923, or 1924-1925
- Venice Junior High School, 1922
- Park Wilshire Building, 1923 LAHCM No. 934
- Rendallia Apartments, 1923
- Warren G. Harding High School, 1923-1924
- Charles Edward Toberman House, 1924
- Asbury Apartments (also called San Jacinto Apartments), 1924-1925 or 1923-1924
- George Thompson Residence, 1926
- Cherokee Building, 1927, contributing property in the Hollywood Boulevard Commercial and Entertainment District
- The Town House, 1928–1929, NRHP No. 96000821, LAHCM No. 576

=== Elsewhere in southern California ===
- Ocean Park Casino, Santa Monica, 1921
- First National Bank of Torrance, Torrance, 1921-1922
- La Jolla-Del Mar Hotel, San Diego, 1926-1927
- Rock Island Beach Club, Balboa, 1926-1927
- El Miro Theater, Santa Monica, 1933 or 1934
- Franklin Apartments, Santa Monica, 1949-1950

== See also ==
- List of American architects
- List of people from Los Angeles
