= Avenel Cooperative Housing Project =

- U.S. National Register of Historic Places
- Los Angeles Historic-Cultural Monument
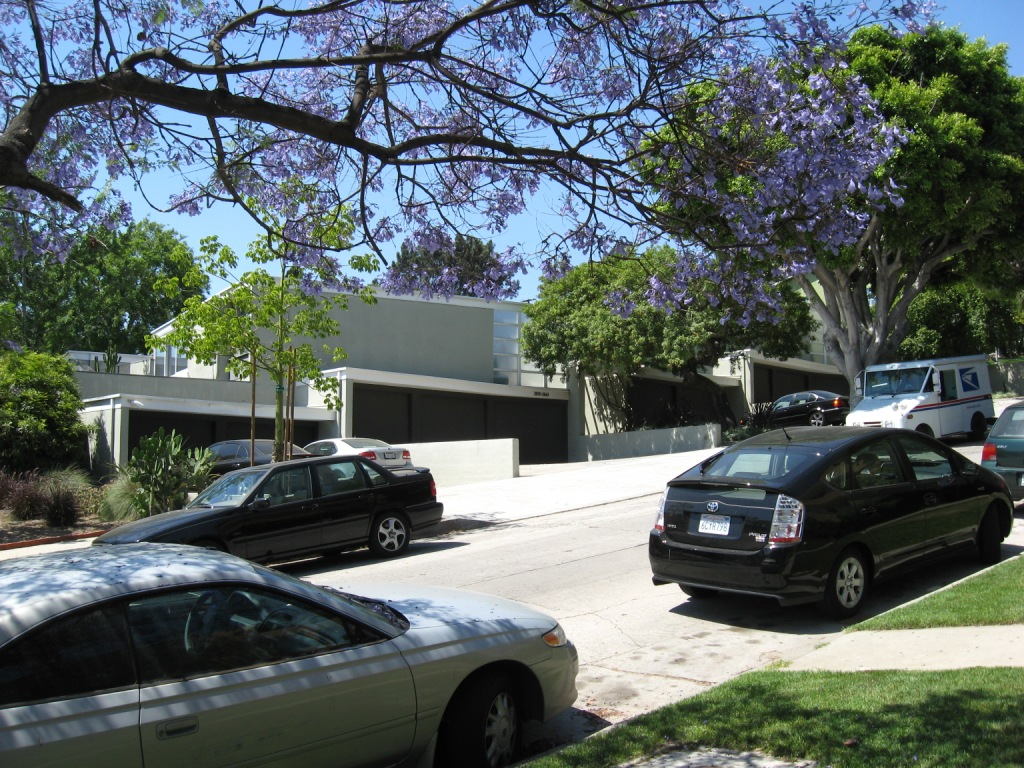
- Avenel Cooperative, 2008

- Location within the Los Angeles metropolitan area Location within California Location within the United States
- Location: 2839-2849 Avenel St., Silver Lake, Los Angeles, California
- Coordinates: 34°6′37″N 118°16′3″W
- Built: 1947
- Architect: Gregory Ain
- Architectural style: Modern Movement
- NRHP reference No.: 05000070
- LAHCM No.: 1221

Significant dates
- Added to NRHP: February 27, 2005
- Designated LAHCM: April 14, 2021

Avenel Cooperative Housing Project, properly known as Avenel Homes, is a 10-unit cooperative housing development designed by architect Gregory Ain, and built in 1947 in the Silver Lake section of Los Angeles. Ain's innovative design has been called "a model for effective use of limited space for low-cost urban housing."

== Members ==
Of the ten original members of the cooperative, at least four were blacklisted or questioned by the House Un-American Activities Committee, including actor Howland Chamberlain. This led to the conclusion that the project was "a cooperative living experiment for a group of communists." Resident and architect Richard Corsini noted: "Most of the people that originally lived here were path-breaking political types," and even after the communist cooperative broke up, the structures remained popular with progressive homeowners. (The claim that the units were originally built for a group of motion picture cartoonists and their families is not correct, but applies instead to Ain's Community Homes project of the same period.)

== Architecture ==
Avenel Homes consists of ten identical three-bedroom units of 960 square feet (89 m^{2}), situated on two 60-foot (18 m) lots, each 140 feet (43 m) deep. The units are organized in two rows of five, attached, and stepping back from the street in a saw-tooth pattern. This configuration gives each unit a front door and a private back patio.

Though small, the unit-plan was noteworthy for its flexibility and openness. It included a sliding wall between the master bedroom and living room, and another between the two smaller bedrooms. Ain's original plan for an 'open' kitchen was rejected by the Federal Housing Administration.

In 2002, the Los Angeles Times ran a 1,500-word feature article about the Avenel project. At that time, one of three remaining original residents, Serril Gerber, told the Times that he and his wife had joined with nine other couples in seeking out Ain, hiring him to build a low-cost complex with a high quality of design. Gerber said, "We'd seen these modern houses in magazines, and we liked the idea of having a living space that is both indoors and outdoors. We liked the idea of doing something really modern, and we liked Greg. He was a radical person in his thinking, because he wanted to put his ideas in the service of regular people. That was his mission, really." Each couple contributed $11,000 to the project.

== Modifications and restoration ==
Over the years, the units had been substantially modified by homeowners, and all but one had expanded the living space to include the outdoor patio area. Also, though built for families of four, most owners had found the units more comfortable for two persons and had converted the master bedrooms into dens.

Preservation architect Gordon Olschlager moved into one of the units in 1992 and restored it using Ain's original drawings. Olschlager removed additions that were not part of Ain's original design. Olschlager also restored the sliding glass walls and sliding wood room dividers. Olschlager did not reverse all of the modifications, however, noting: "When you talk to people who know Gregory Ain, they say that he would have been comfortable with people personalizing their space." Olschlager won a Merit Award in the Western Home Awards for his work on the Avenel Cooperative.

By 2002, the units had become "magnets for architecture buffs" and were selling for "well over $300,000."

== Historic designation ==
Avenel Homes was listed in the National Register of Historic Places in 2005 and as a Los Angeles Historic-Cultural Monument in 2021.

== See also ==
- Job 541: Avenel Housing Association, Julius Shulman photography archive, Getty Research Institute
- List of Registered Historic Places in Los Angeles
- Gregory Ain
