= Charles Warren Callister =

American architect

- Born: February 27, 1917; Rochester, New York
- Died: April 3, 2008 (aged 91); Novato, California
- Occupation: Architect
- Practice: Hillmer-Callister; Callister, Payne, & Rosse; Callister & Payne; Callister, Payne, & Bischoff; Callister, Gately, Heckmann, Bischoff; Callister, Gately, Heckmann Associates

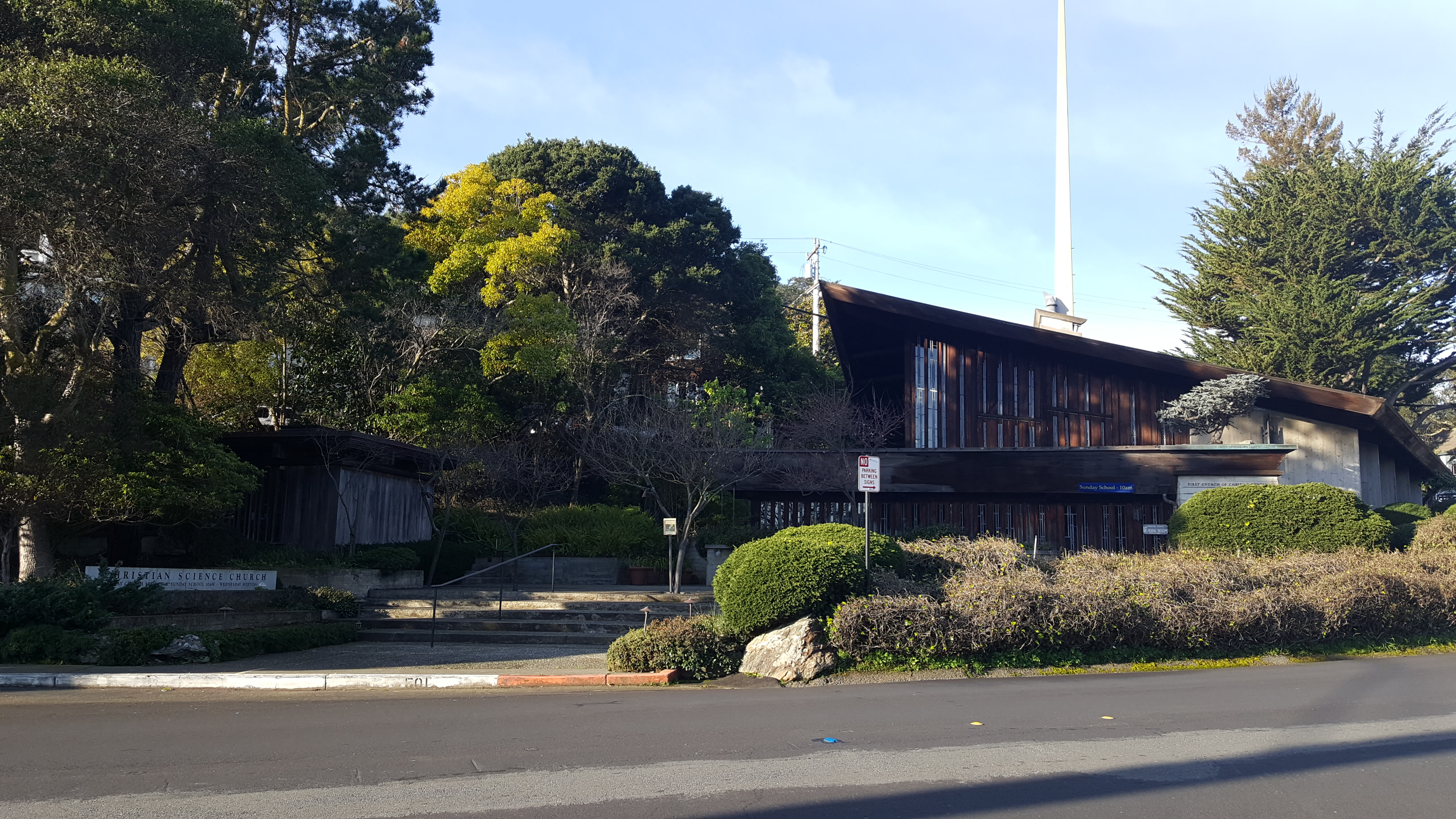
Christian Science Church, Belvedere, California

Charles Warren Callister (February 27, 1917 – April 3, 2008) was an American architect based in Tiburon, California. He is known for the hand-crafted aesthetic and high-level design of his single-family homes and large community developments. Callister's most notable projects include the Mill Valley Christian Science Church (1955), the Duncan House (1959) in San Francisco, Rossmoor Leisure World (1963) in Walnut Creek, CA, and the Mills College Chapel (1968).

== Early life ==
Callister was born in Rochester, NY and grew up in New York, Florida, Ohio, and Texas. As a teenager, he studied art at the Witte Museum in San Antonio. He earned a scholarship for college that limited him to schools in Texas, none of which had a fine arts program, so he decided to study architecture, art, and sociology at the University of Texas at Austin. He attended the University from 1935-1941 when he was drafted into World War II. He served in the United States Army Corps of Engineers (1941-1955) helping to build the ALCAN Highway in Alaska, and later served as a pilot for the Air Force.

== Career ==
Upon returning from the war, Callister, his wife Mary Frances, and their two sons moved to Northern California where he and his former Texas classmate Jack Hillmer (1918-2007) established the architectural practice Hillmer-Callister in San Francisco. Their first project was the Hall House in Kentfield (1947) considered to be the first residential application of post-tensioned concrete slab technology in the United States. Callister and Hillmer were both active in Telesis, an organization of architects, landscape architects, urban planners and designers who played a significant role in the beginnings of the environmental planning and design movement in the San Francisco Bay Area. Callister went on to establish the firm of Callister, Payne & Rosse in Tiburon, CA in 1950, which would later expand to include an east coast office in Amherst, Massachusetts during the 1960s. John Payne and Martin Rosse worked with Callister designing residences, churches, and communities for which they received many awards including the National Lumberman’s 1965 Wood Structure Design Award. Callister had many design partners over the years, including Jim Bischoff, David Gately, and Michael Heckmann.

Callister is well known for incorporating high-level design into large developments and new communities. Rossmoor (1964), a retirement community in Walnut Creek, CA, gained the firm national attention. His numerous sub-division developments for client Otto Paparazzo show a unique understanding of community planning and residential needs. His recognized designs include the Christian Science churches in Belvedere (1953) and Mill Valley (1955), California; the Mills College Chapel (1968) in Oakland; and the UC Santa Cruz Field House (1955). Though he did not receive his architect’s license until 1988, Callister’s design process focused on “creating together appropriate designs that belong to the natural environment and that are rooted in the nature of the clients.”

== Style ==
Callister was considered a leader in the Second Bay Area Tradition, a style of architecture that responded to regional climate, geography, materials, and life-style while also incorporating elements of modern design. Callister described his work as ″trying to reflect the region I'm in.″ His design process began by walking the site and listening, a technique he learned from photographer Minor White. ″You leave yourself open and it all starts flooding in. You’re listening for more than superficial things. The most powerful things come in when you listen. You have to find the architecture, you don’t come to it preconceived.″

Callister's work was heavily influenced by Japanese architecture. During a trip to Asia in 1966, he was impressed by the ″art of doing,″ emphasizing the process of creation rather than the product itself. This is evident in his use of natural materials and expressive wood joinery, reminiscent of Arts & Crafts architects Greene and Greene. The Flowers Residence in Berkeley is such an example.

== Legacy ==
Callister was an active researcher and educator throughout his career. During the 1960s he lectured at Stanford University, Syracuse University, Columbia University, University of Colorado, and University of British Columbia. He was the recipient of the Award of Excellence, Urban Land Institute, 1982 and the prestigious Award of Honor, San Francisco Art Commission, 1983. Callister died in Novato, California on April 3, 2008.

== Archive ==
The Charles Warren Callister Collection is held by the Environmental Design Archives at the University of California, Berkeley. The collection spans the years 1936-2007 and documents his career including his education, research interests, and architectural practice. The bulk of the collection relates to his architectural and community planning projects and includes project files, correspondence, promotional brochures, drawings, photographs, and slides. Well documented projects include Talcott Village (1968-1973) in Farmington, CT; Heritage Village (1955-1971) for client Otto Paparazzo in Southbury, CT; and the California State Exposition and Fair (1965-1968, 1972) in Sacramento, CA. Also of interest are his research notes, patent research, and written articles. Arrangement, description and preservation of this collection was funded by a grant from the National Historic Publications and Records Commission (NHPRC).
