= Los Angeles Trade–Technical College =

College in Los Angeles, California, US

Coordinates: 34.0315°N 118.2706°W

Los Angeles Trade-Technical College
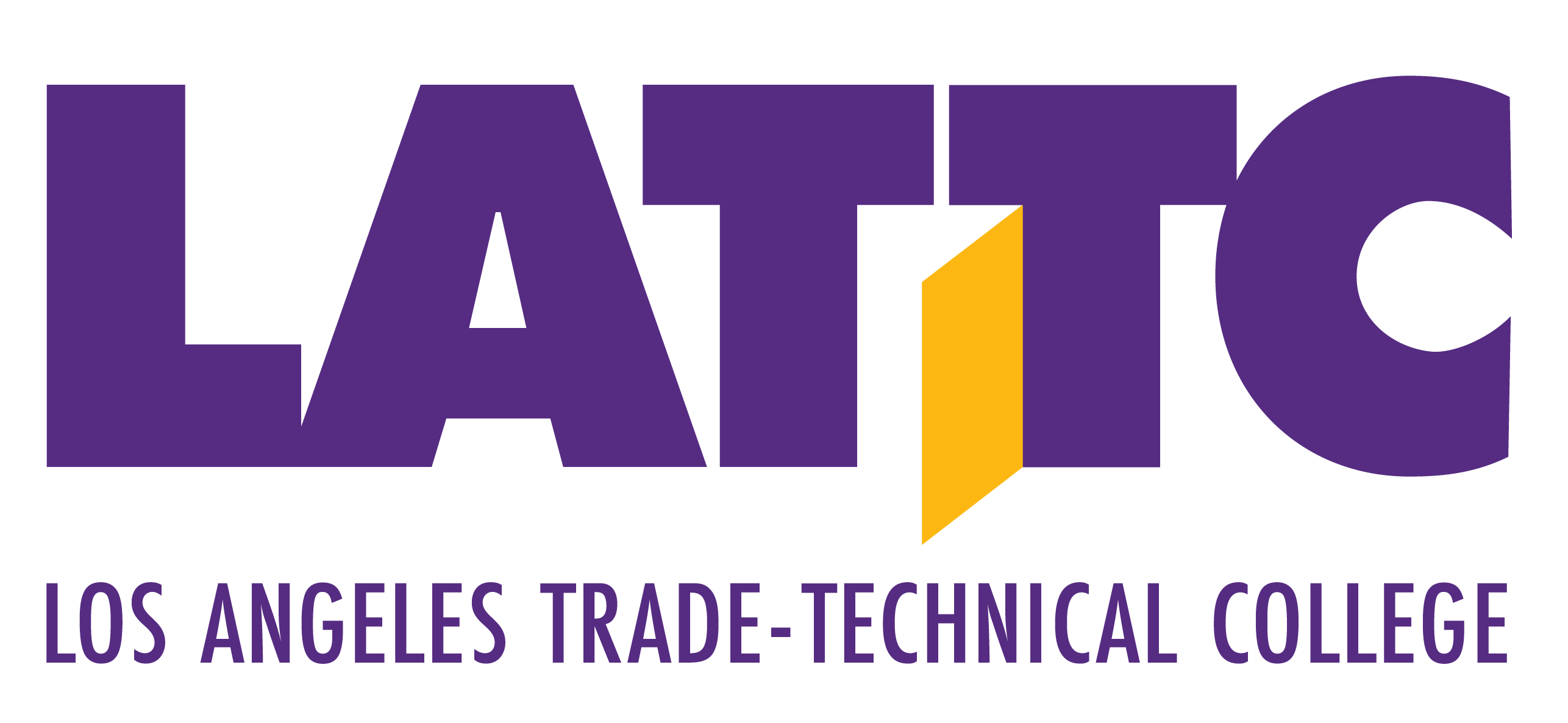
- Logo
- Former names: Frank Wiggins Trade School, Metropolitan Business School (merged)
- Type: Public community college
- Established: 1925
- President: Alfred McQuarters
- Faculty: 190 (2022)
- Administrative staff: 269
- Students: 16,766 (2022)
- Location: 400 West Washington Blvd. Los Angeles, California, United States
- Campus: Urban
- Colors: Violet and Gold
- Nickname: Beavers
- Mascot: Bucky Beaver
- Website: www.lattc.edu

Los Angeles Trade-Technical College (L.A. Trade-Tech, LATTC) is a public community college in Los Angeles, California, US. It is part of the Los Angeles Community College District and is accredited by the Accrediting Commission for Community and Junior Colleges (ACCJC), American Culinary Federation, and National League for Nursing, among others.

== History ==
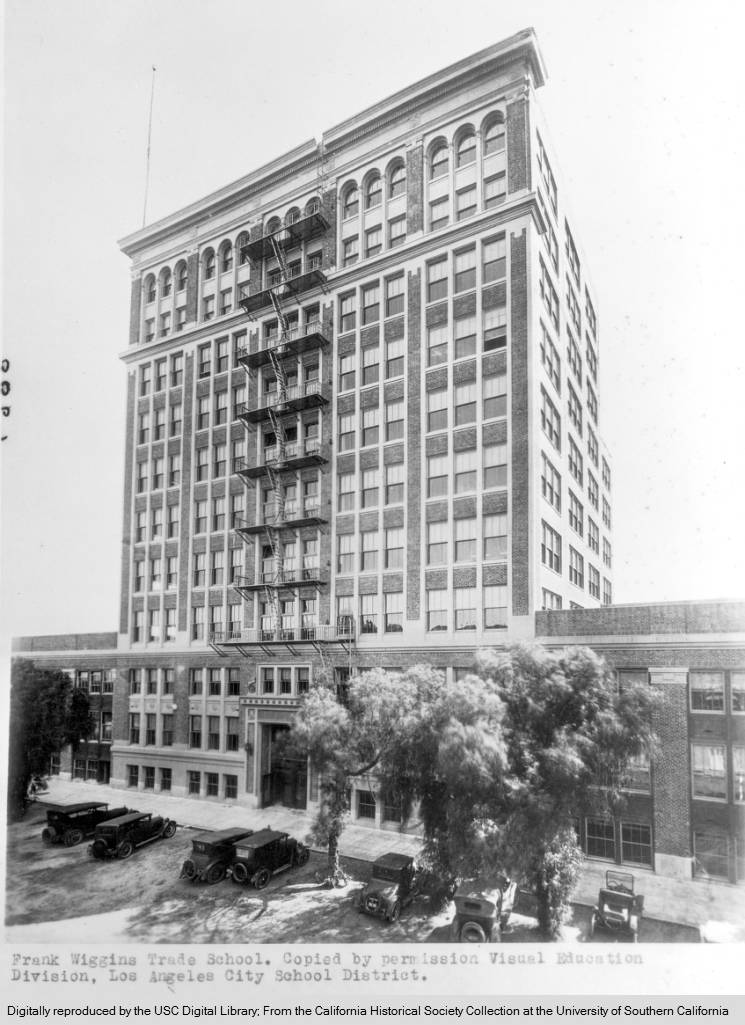
The original Frank Wiggins Trade School building, in Los Angeles Historic Core, c. 1925.

Founded as the Frank Wiggins Trade School in 1925, the college is the oldest of the nine campuses of the Los Angeles Community College District.

After World War II, the school moved to the former campus of John H. Francis Polytechnic High School, which had relocated to Sun Valley. It then expanded the campus and combined with Metropolitan College to expand its programs.

In 1954, the school was renamed Los Angeles Trade-Technical Junior College. In 1969, the college became a part of the Los Angeles Community College District.

L.A. Trade Tech's fashion design program is the oldest in Los Angeles, having started in 1925. During World War Two, the college offered around-the-clock courses so women could train in vocational areas to help the war effort.

The college was featured on the PBS television series Downtown with Huell Howser.

== Campus ==
Student body composition as of 2022
Race and ethnicity	Total
Hispanic	70%
Black	13%
White	7%
Asian	4%
Unknown	3%
Two or more races (Note: Other consists of Multiracial Americans & those who prefer to not say.)	2%
Foreign national	1%
Gender Distribution
Male	49%
Female	51%
Age Distribution
Under 18	13%
18–24	42%
25–64	45%

The 25-acre campus is located just south of the Historic Core of Los Angeles. The Los Angeles Trade-Technical College (LATTC), is located at 400 West Washington Boulevard. LATTC offers courses ranging from automotive technology and culinary arts to nursing and construction trades.

The campus spans multiple city blocks and features laboratories, classrooms, a library, and a student center.

Also on-campus, Bucky's Pride Center features computer stations, printers, and a social lounge area, while also providing mental health and wellness services, sexual education, and financial assistance.

Fall Demographics of student body
Ethnic Breakdown	2018	2017
Hispanic and Latino American	69%	67%
African American	13%	15%
Asian American	2%	3%
Native Hawaiian or other Pacific Islander	0%	0%
White	3%	4%
Multiracial Americans	1%	1%
International students	2%	2%
Unknown	9%	8%
Female	48%	48%
Male	52%	52%

== Notable alumni ==
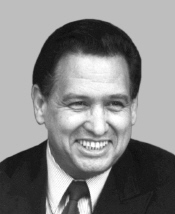
Matthew G. Martínez member of the United States House of Representatives

- Lester Oliver Bankhead (1912–1997), architect, attended in around 1945, and known for church architecture in Los Angeles, California
- Don Campbell (1951–2020), creator of the hip-hop dance style called locking
- Matthew G. Martínez (1929–2011), United States House of Representatives member
- Allan McCollum (born 1944), New York City-based contemporary artist
- Rick Owens (born 1962), fashion designer, owner of the Rick Owens clothing label
- Jeffrey Sebelia, fashion designer, winner of Project Runway Season 3, and founder of the clothing label "Cosa Nostra"
- Tadashi Shoji (born 1948), Japanese-American fashion designer, and owner of Tadashi Shoji and T by Tadashi clothing labels
- Mister Cartoon (born 1968/1969), tattoo artist and painter

== See also ==
- California Community Colleges System
