= El Miro Theater =

Former movie theater in Santa Monica, California

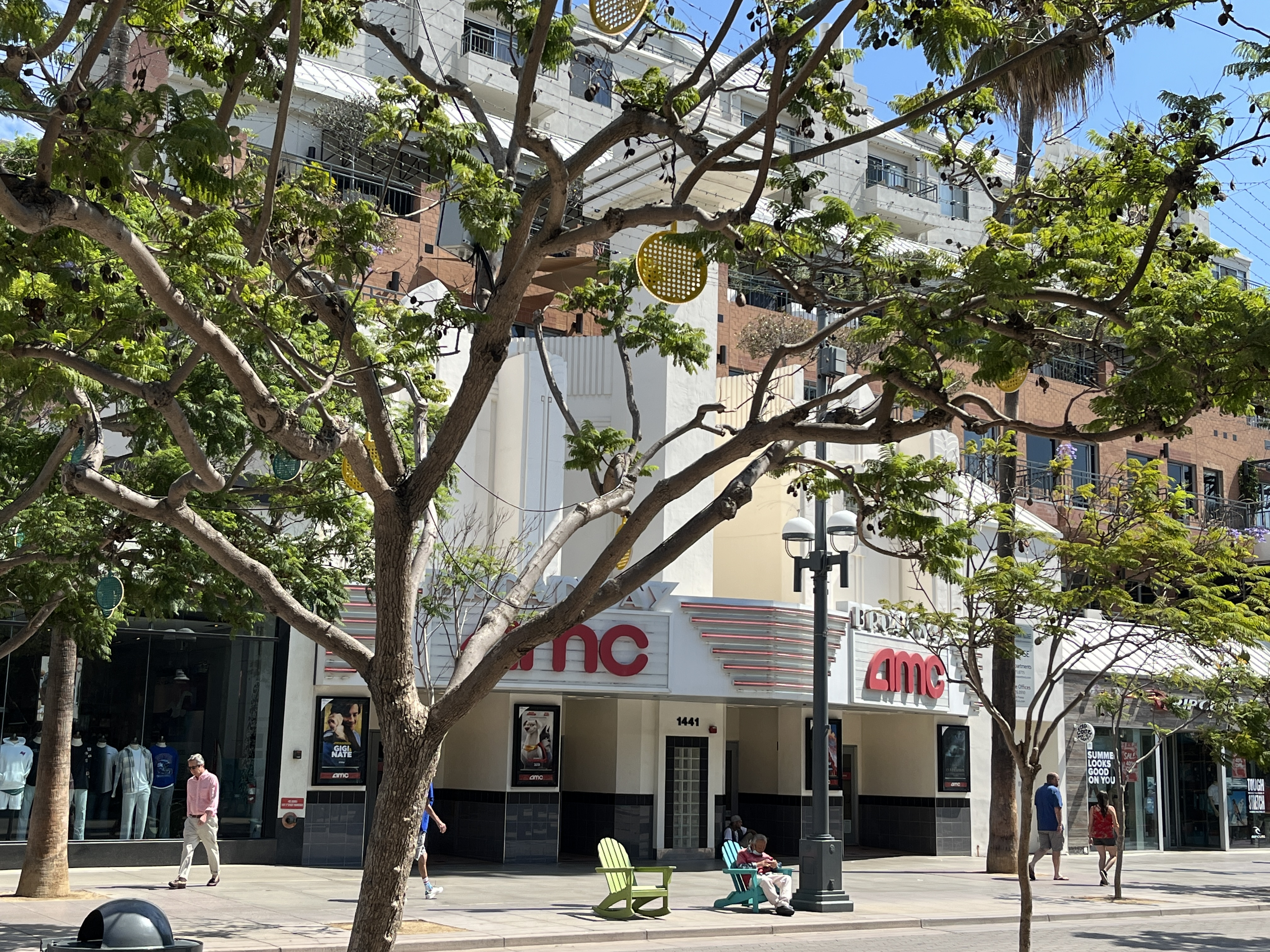
- The theater's facade in 2022
- Interactive map of El Miro Theater
- Address: 1441 Third Street Promenade; Santa Monica, California; United States
- Coordinates: 34°00′54″N 118°29′41″W
- Screen: 4

Construction
- Opened: 1934; 92 years ago
- Closed: September 22, 2024
- Architect: Norman W. Alpaugh

The El Miro Theater (Note: Sometimes printed as Elmiro Theater. Various former operating names include Cine Latino, Cineplex Odeon Broadway 4, Loews Cineplex Broadway Cinemas 4, AMC Loews Broadway 4, and AMC Broadway 4.) is a partially historic former movie theater on the Third Street Promenade in Santa Monica, California. Designed by Norman W. Alpaugh in the Art Deco style, it opened in 1934 as a single-screen, 900-seat movie palace. It operated under several different chains in the 20th century and briefly operated on a Spanish language program in the 1980s. All of the original theater except its facade was demolished and then rebuilt as a four-screen multiplex in 1989. AMC Theatres operated the venue until its closure in 2024.

== History ==
In December 1933, Ira C. Copley, head of Southern California Newspapers Associated, commissioned the construction of a movie theater on Third Street in Santa Monica at the cost of US$32,000 ($796,000 in 2025). Bernard J. Levitt operated the theater as a lessee. In July 1940, Levitt bought the building from Copley for over $75,000 ($1,724,000 in 2025).

On April 24, 1963, the El Miro reopened following renovations. New provisions in the theater included an expanded lobby and concession stand, renovated restrooms, new seats, upgraded sound equipment, a new projector, and a larger screen. The reopening was marked by the West Coast premiere of the Frank Tashlin comedy film The Man from the Diners' Club that night. One of the film's co-stars, Telly Savalas, attended, as did Stefanie Powers, Michael Callan, Cindy Carol, and Nancy Kovack. Los Angeles radio personality Johnny Grant served as the master of ceremonies for the event.

The theater operated as Cine Latino, a Spanish-language theater, in the 1980s until it was closed in 1987. Following its closure, the original facade was preserved while the single-screen theater was demolished and replaced by a four-screen multiplex. It reopened in 1989 under the management of Cineplex Odeon.

In September 2024, AMC Theatres permanently closed the El Miro due to poor performance.

== Architecture ==
Los Angeles architect Norman W. Alpaugh designed the theater in the Art Deco style. Upon its commission in 1933, the Venice Vanguard reported that the building would be one of the first earthquake-proofed structures in Santa Monica. The building's originals dimensions included a 50 foot (15 m) frontage on Third Street and a 160 foot (49 m) deep interior to the back alley.
