= Statue of the Marquis de Lafayette (Los Angeles) =

Statue in Los Angeles, California, U.S.

- The sculpture in 2022
- Subject: Gilbert du Motier, Marquis de Lafayette
- Location: Los Angeles, California, U.S.; 34°3′42.7″N 118°17′0.5″W

A statue of Gilbert du Motier, Marquis de Lafayette is installed in Los Angeles' Lafayette Park, in the U.S. state of California. The sculpture was installed at the park's Wilshire Boulevard entrance in 1937.
