= Sims High School =

African American high school (1927–1970)

Coordinates: 34.707167°N 81.61795°W

Sims High School is a former high school for African American students in Union, Union County, South Carolina. It opened in 1927 and was the first Black high school in Union County. It closed in 1970 A historical marker (number 44-8) was erected in 2004 in the city of Union to commemorate the former school. When the high school closed the school building was used by Sims Middle School from 1970 until 2009. During segregation in the United States, African American were barred from attending schools with whites.

== History ==
Sims High School was founded in 1927. Rev. A. A. Sims (1872–1965) served as principal from its establishment until 1951. In 1929, it became the first state-accredited high school for African-Americans in Upstate South Carolina. Sims was succeeded as principal by James F. Moorer from 1951 to 1969. Moorer also coached the football team and from 1946 to 1954, and recorded 93 consecutive conference wins for 8 years straight.

A new Sims High School building opened in 1956 at 200 Sims Drive in Union. C. A. Powell, a white man, was the high school’s final principal from 1969 to 1970. In 1970, it was converted to Sims Middle School, an integrated junior high school, and then closed in 2009. A new Sims Middle School building subsequently opened.

Oral interviews of graduates, and a 2006 reunion were held for the high school. A historical marker was added in 2004, to commemorated the school's history. Alumni include the first Black head coach in NCAA Division I-A football, the first coach of a black college basketball team in the National Invitational Tournament (NIT), and the first black Chief of Chaplains of the United States Army. Willie Jeffries played for coach James Moorer, and he went on to coach South Carolina State University. Architect Lester Oliver Bankhead is thought to have attended the school. Former Sims teacher Janie Goree was elected mayor of Carlisle in 1978.

In 2020, the school building was still in good condition and it was suggested it be re-opened as an elementary school. The building was listed on the National Register of Historic Places in 2023.
