= Boardner's =

Bar in Los Angeles, California, U.S.

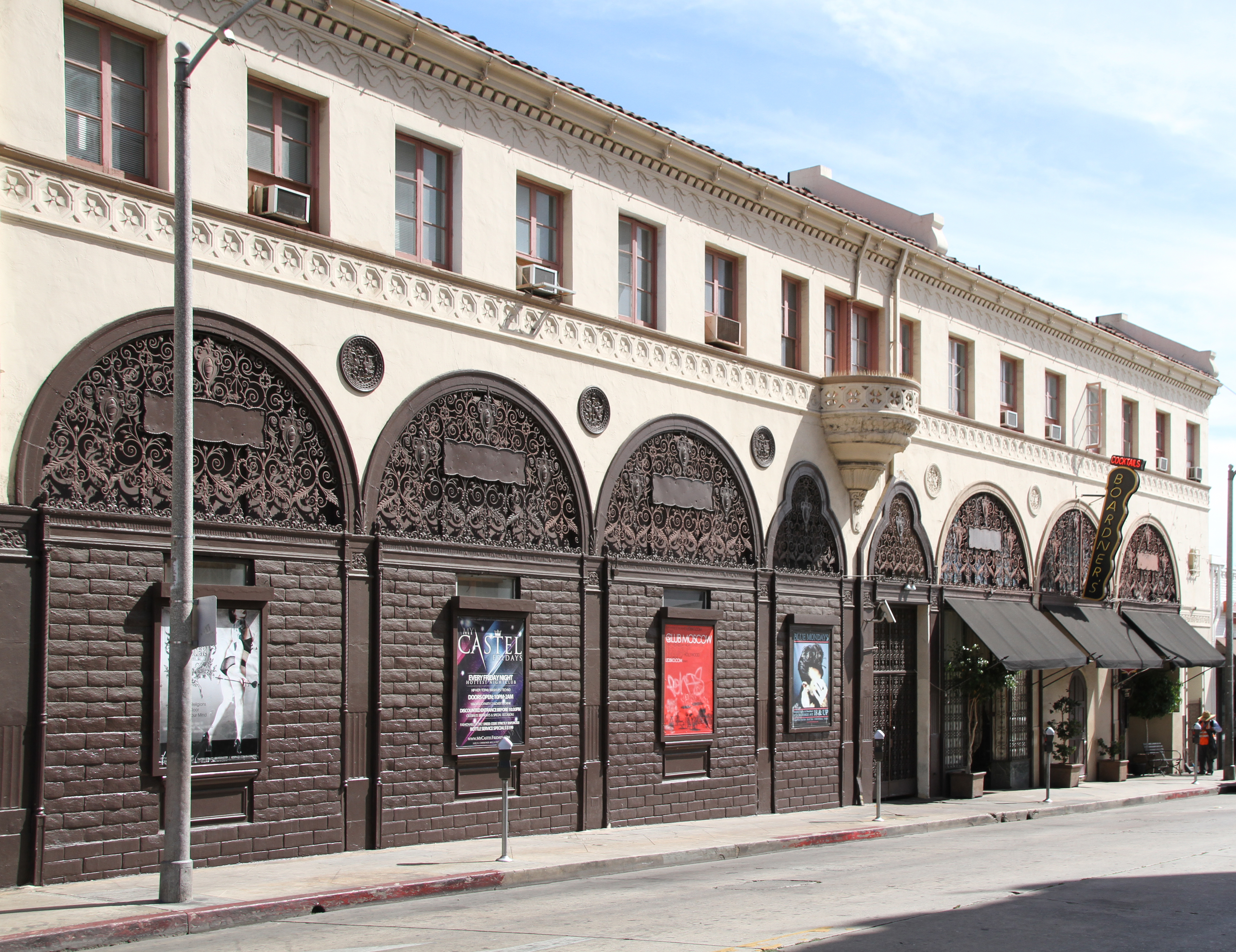
- Boardner's in the Cherokee Building, 2014
- Interactive map of Boardner's

Restaurant information
- Established: 1942
- Owner: Tricia La Belle
- Previous owners: Steve Boardner; Dave Hadley and Kurt Richter
- Location: 1652 N Cherokee Ave, Los Angeles, Los Angeles County, California
- Coordinates: 34.101°N 118.335°W
- Website: https://boardners.com/

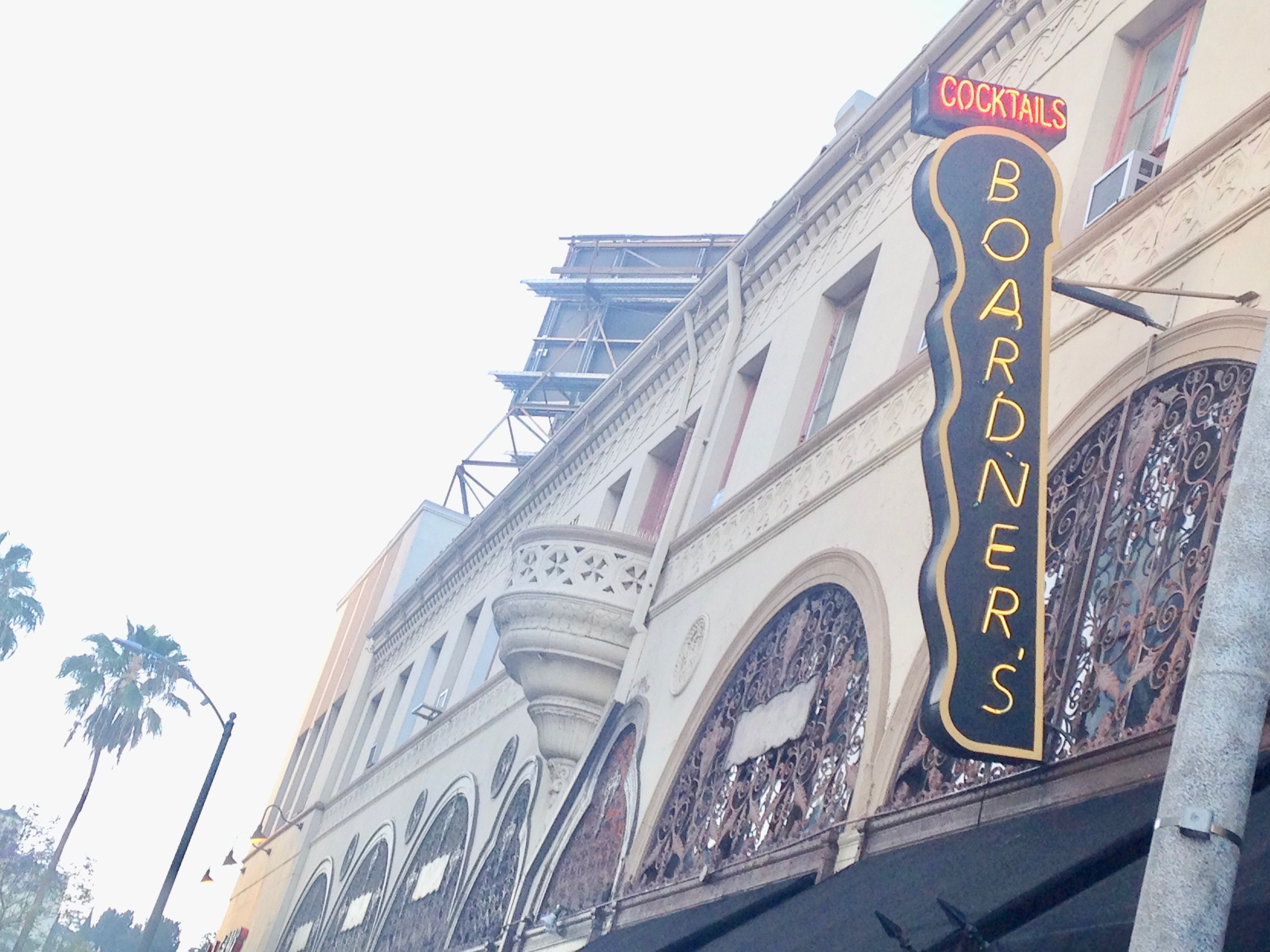
Boardner's neon marquee

Boardner's, also known as Boardner's by La Belle, is a historic restaurant and bar located at 1652 N Cherokee Ave, just south of Hollywood Boulevard, in Hollywood, California. It is known for its film noir atmosphere, popularity within the entertainment industry and with other notable figures, and Bar Sinister, the eldritch dance party it has hosted every Saturday since the 1990s.

== History ==
Steve Boardner took ownership of his first bar, Crossroads in the Crossroads, in 1942, when a Crossroads of the World bar owner swapped his ABC license for Boardner's 1941 Pontiac. Boardner moved his bar into the nearby Cherokee Building in January 1944, at which point he renamed it Boardner's. The new location was previously home to a speakeasy and hair salon, a Gene Austin owned nightclub, and several bars, including a gay bar.

In 1980, pornography businessmen Dave Hadley and Kurt Richter bought Boardner's, intending it to be a meeting place for people in the adult entertainment industry. In 1999, former model, paralegal, and ICM employee Tricia La Belle bought the business from them.

In the 1990s, Boardner's began hosting Bar Sinister, a BDSM and goth subculture dance party, every Saturday. Boardner's also hosted the 2019 XRCO Awards on June 27, 2020.

== Clientele ==
Through the 1940s, secret men's societies including The Hot Stove League, Masquers, and Saints & Sinners met at Boardner's, and it was also one of Los Angeles's most notorious horse gambling and roll-of-the-dice hot spots.

Boardner's was popular with numerous figures both inside the entertainment industry and out, including Errol Flynn, Peggy Lee, Phil Harris, Ed Wood, Alan Hale Jr, Lucille Ball, Art Aragon, George Gobel, Lawrence Tierney, Tom Hatten, and more. Gangsters Mickey Cohen, the Milano Brothers, the Sica Brothers, Jack Dragna, and the Two Tonys were regulars, the latter of whom were shot to death in their car just a few hundred yards from the business. W.C. Fields, Wallace Beery, Charles Bukowski, Mickey Mantle, and Joe DiMaggio were also known to have visited. More recently, Nicole Kidman, Quentin Tarantino, Ben Affleck, John Lennon, Russell Crowe, Vince Vaughan, Kiefer Sutherland, Heath Ledger, Warren Zevon, Courtney Love, Terri Nunn, Axl Rose, Tommy Lee, and Slash patronized this establishment as well.

The owner of nearby Miceli's was both a patron and friend of Boardner's, with each business helping point to the direction of the other.

Elizabeth Short AKA the Black Dahlia was also a regular, and may have had her last drink here before she was murdered.

== Film location ==
Boardner's is a popular shoot location for many movies and television shows, including Hollywood Homicide, L.A. Confidential, Beverly Hills 90210, NCIS: Los Angeles, Gangster Squad, Swingers, Gone Girl, Don't Trust the B— in Apartment 23, Arrested Development, Ed Wood, Wag The Dog, Leaving Las Vegas, The Client List, Southland, True Blood, Crocodile Dundee in Los Angeles, Alias, Angel, How to Get Away with Murder, Cold Case, Ray Donovan, Bosch and more. Pornography has shot at Boardner's as well.
