= Lafayette Park (Los Angeles) =

Park in Los Angeles, California, U.S.

Coordinates: 34.062012°N 118.283260°W

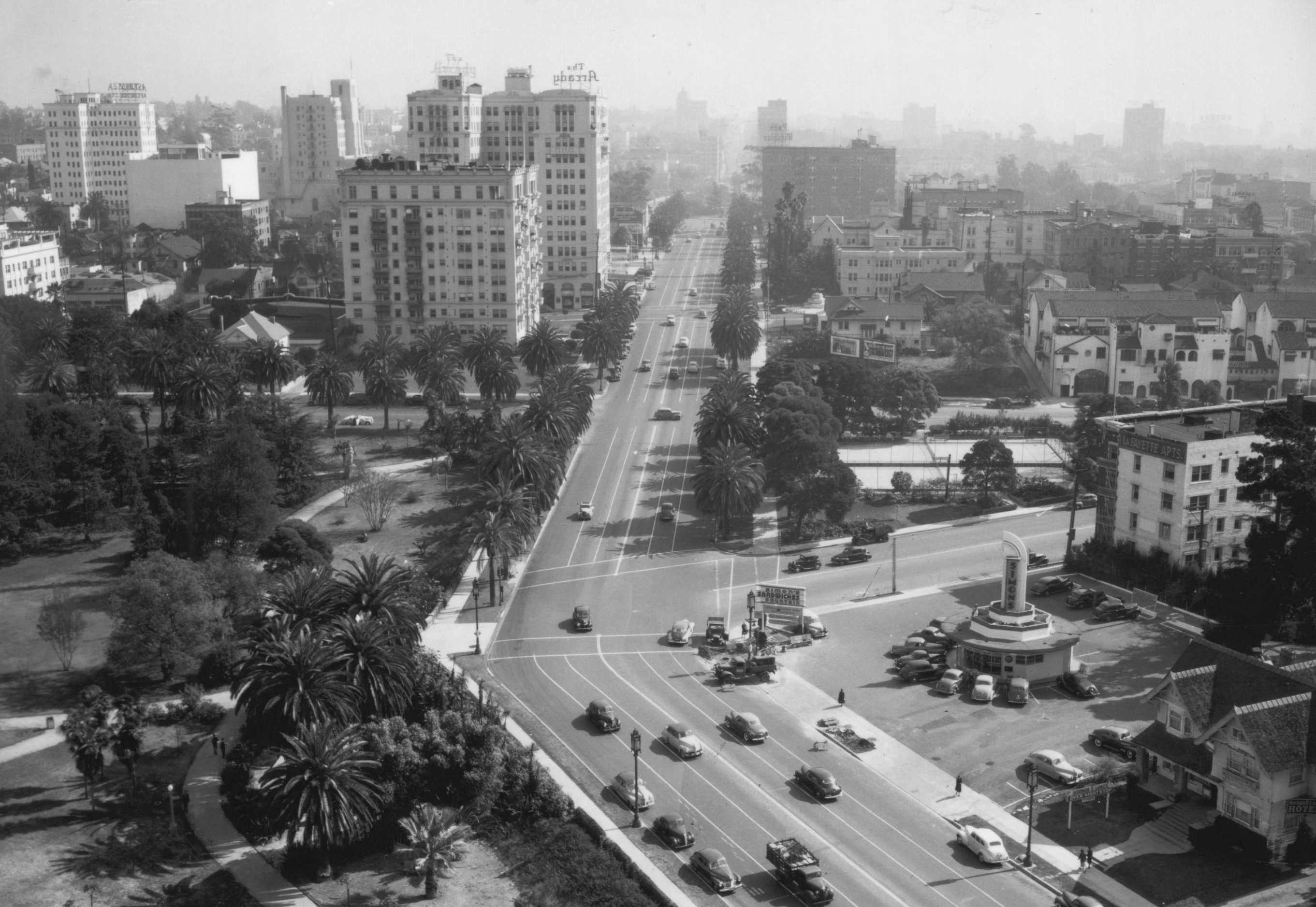
- Lafayette Park (left) in 1945; facing east.
- Interactive map of Lafayette Park
- Type: Urban park
- Location: Los Angeles, California, United States
- Area: 35 acres (14 ha)
- Created: 1899
- Operator: City of Los Angeles Department of Recreation and Parks
- Status: Open all year
- Website: www.laparks.org/dos/reccenter/facility/lafayetteMCC.htm

Lafayette Recreation Center, also known as Lafayette Park, is a public park in the Westlake district of Los Angeles, California, United States.

== History ==
In 1899, Clara R. Shatto donated 35 acres (14 ha) of land to the City of Los Angeles. The land consisted of tar seeps and oil wells and Shatto requested that it be developed into a park. Shatto was the wife of George Shatto, the then-owner of Santa Catalina Island.

Canary Island palm trees and jacaranda were planted in the area of what became known as Sunset Park. Local groups requested that the name be changed to commemorate Marquis de Lafayette, a military officer of the American Revolutionary War. The name was officially changed in 1918. A statue of him was erected in 1937, close to the Wilshire Boulevard entrance.

A senior center designed by architect Graham Latta opened on the east side of the park in 1963. It was expanded by architect Stephen Kanner, whose firm improved the classrooms, community rooms, and gymnasium. In 2011, the Los Angeles Department of Recreation and Parks partnered with the non-profit organization Heart of Los Angeles (HOLA) to offer youth programs. The complex was renamed "Lafayette Park Recreation Center".

The park features sports facilities, including basketball courts. These have been featured in popular media, such as the 1992 sports comedy, White Men Can't Jump, during which 20th Century Fox performed renovation to the facilities. Also available for public use is the "Lafayette Skate Park".

== Vicinity ==
The park's vicinity has seen the construction of numerous architecturally significant buildings of which several are listed in the National Register of Historic Places: the Sheraton Town-House, Felipe de Neve Branch Library, and Bullocks Wilshire, all built in 1929. Neighboring the park are also the First Congregational Church — an English Gothic Revival building completed in 1932 — and a 19-story glass building that houses a branch of the Los Angeles Superior Court (built in 1972).

Lafayette Park is fenced off and closed at night, avoiding much of the negative reputation that affects its immediate neighbor, MacArthur Park. However, access to the park is available at all times of the day.

== Emergency services ==
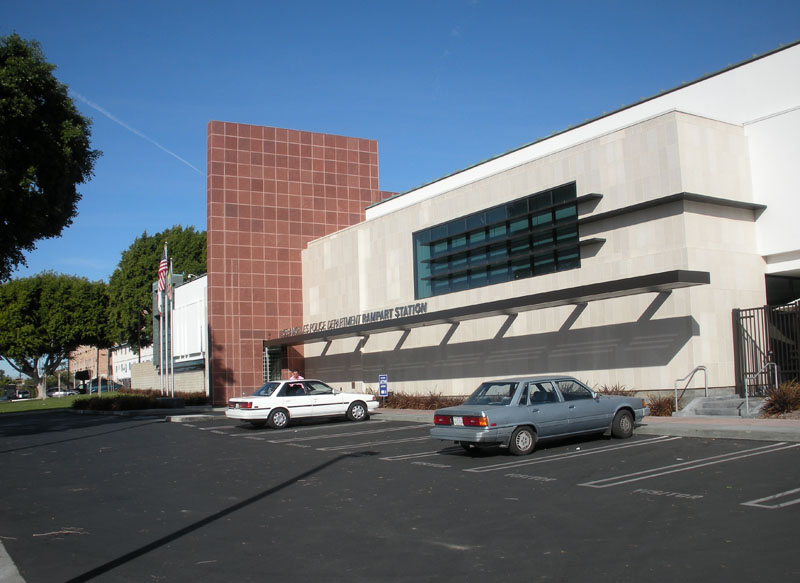
The New Rampart Police Station

Los Angeles Police Department operates the Rampart Community Police Station. It was originally located at 2710 West Temple Street, 90026, serving the area around the park . It has since moved east into a newly constructed facility at 1401 West 6th Street, the site of the former emergency receiving hospital. Beginning January 4, 2009, the park became the responsibility of the newly created Olympic Division, LAPD.

== Notes ==
- Angels Walk LA (2006). "Angels Walk LA, Self-guided Historic Trails, Wilshire" (PDF). angelswalkla.org. Angels Walk LA.
