= Gregory Ain =

American architect (1908–1988)

- Born: Gregory Samuel Ain; March 28, 1908; Pittsburgh, Pennsylvania, U.S.
- Died: January 9, 1988 (aged 79); Los Angeles, California, U.S.
- Occupation: Architect
- Spouses: Agnes Budin (m. 1929; div. 1936) Josephine Cohen (m. 1938; div. 1939) Ruth March French, aka Sirun Mussikian (m. 1940; div. 1950) Florence Arkin (m. 1964; div. 1967)
- Children: 2

Gregory Samuel Ain (March 28, 1908 – January 9, 1988) was an American architect active in the mid-20th century. Working primarily in the Los Angeles area, Ain is best known for bringing elements of modern architecture to lower- and medium-cost housing. He addressed "the common architectural problems of common people".

Esther McCoy said "Ain was an idealist who gave the better part of ten years to combatting outmoded planning and building codes, and hoary real estate practices."

== Early life and education ==
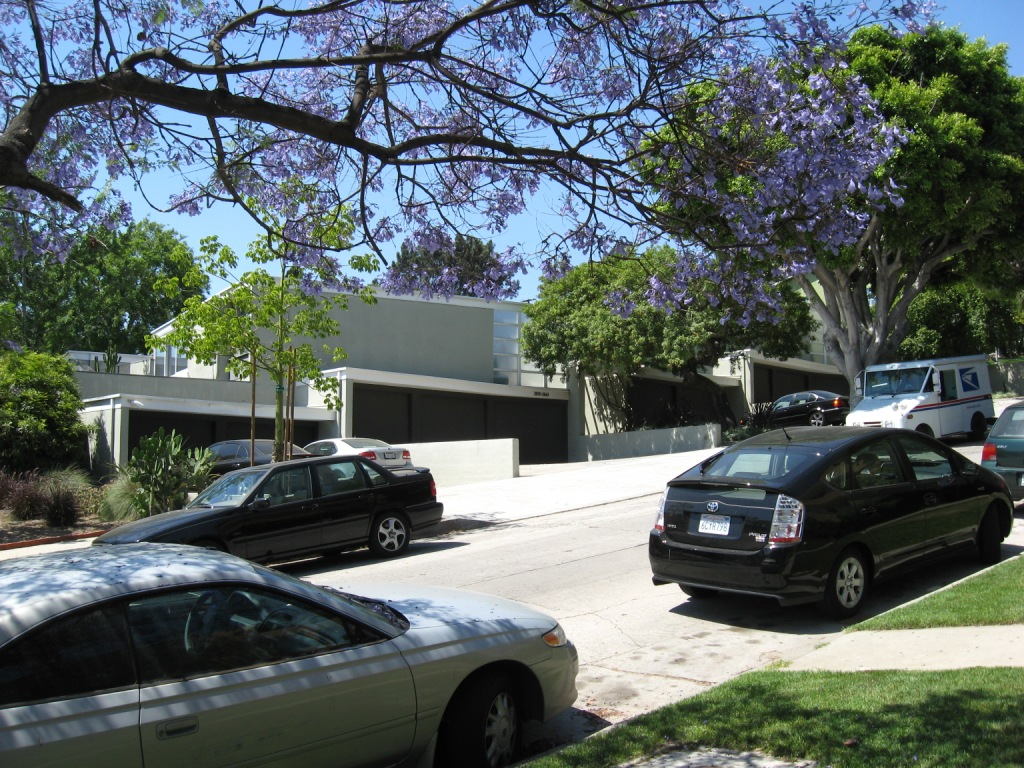
Avenel Housing Group, Silver Lake, Los Angeles, California

Born to Baer and Chiah Ain in Pittsburgh, in 1908, Ain was raised in the Lincoln Heights neighborhood of Los Angeles. For a short time during his childhood, the Ain family lived at Llano del Rio, an experimental collective farming colony in the Antelope Valley of California.

He was inspired to become an architect after visiting the Schindler House as a teenager. He attended the University of Southern California School of Architecture in 1927–28, but dropped out after feeling limited by the school's Beaux Arts training.

== Career ==
His primary influences were Rudolph Schindler and Richard Neutra. He worked for Neutra from 1930 to 1935, along with fellow apprentice Harwell Hamilton Harris, and contributed to Neutra's major projects of that period.

Following his collaborative relationship with Richard Neutra, in 1935, Ain cultivated an individual practice designing modest houses for working-class and middle class clients.

Ain was awarded a Guggenheim Fellowship in 1940 to study housing. During World War II, Ain was Chief Engineer for Charles and Ray Eames in the development of their well-known leg-splints and plywood chairs, including the DCW and LCW series.

The 1930s and 1940s represented Ain's most productive period. During this period, his principled quest to address "the common architectural problems of common people", prompted the implementation of flexible floor plans and open kitchens. In the 1940s, he formed a partnership with Joseph Johnson and Alfred Day in order to design large housing tracts. Major projects of this period included Community Homes, Park Planned Homes, Avenel Homes, and Mar Vista Housing. The Gregory Ain Mar Vista Tract became L.A.'s first Modern historic district in 2003. He collaborated with landscape architect Garrett Eckbo on each of these projects, which typify mid-century modern design. Ain also practiced in a "loose partnership" with James Garrott for roughly 20 years, beginning in 1940. They designed their own small office building together on Hyperion Avenue in the Silver Lake neighborhood. Their projects attracted the attention of Philip Johnson, the curator of architecture at the Museum of Modern Art, who commissioned Ain to design and construct MoMA's second exhibition house in the museum's garden in 1950, following that of Marcel Breuer in 1949.

In the late early 1950s, Ain's practice was diminished as he was perceived as a communist. For example, in 1949, he was listed by the California Senate Factfinding Subcommittee on Un-American Activities as "among the committee's most notorious critics." The growing "Red Scare" caused him to lose several opportunities, including participation in John Entenza's Case Study Program.

Ain also taught architecture at USC after the war. Then, from 1963 to 1967, he served as the Dean of the Pennsylvania State University School of Architecture. He then returned to Los Angeles and died in 1988.

== Legacy ==
Ain's papers are kept at the Architecture and Design Collection, at the Art, Design & Architecture Museum, at the University of California, Santa Barbara.

Gregory Ain is the focus of a long standing project, The Bauhaus Ranch and documentary, No Place Like Utopia, directed and produced by Christiane Robbins and Professor Katherine Lambert, AIA. This film is based on their extensive and rigorous research that maintained that Ain's 1950 MoMA Exhibition House, "Our View of the Future", had never been destroyed as had been alleged by architectural historians. They publicly offered their position in 2015 and materialized this thesis in their cross disciplinary installation, "This Future Has a Past", first exhibited at the 2016 Venice Architecture Biennial and then at the Center for Architecture, NYC in 2017.

== Buildings ==
- 1936: Edwards House, Los Angeles, California
- 1937: Ernst House, Los Angeles, California
- 1937: Byler House, Mt. Washington (Los Angeles), California
- 1937–39: Dunsmuir Flats, Los Angeles, California
- 1938: Brownfield Medical Building, Los Angeles, California (later destroyed)
- 1938: Beckman House, Los Angeles, California
- 1939: Daniel House, Silver Lake (Los Angeles), California
- 1939: Margaret and Harry Hay House, North Hollywood, California
- 1939: Tierman House, Silver Lake (Los Angeles), California
- 1939: Scharlin house, Silver Lake (Los Angeles), California
- 1939: Vorkapich Garden House, for Slavko Vorkapich, Beverly Hills, California (later destroyed)
- 1941: Ain House, Hollywood, California
- 1941: Orans House, Silver Lake (Los Angeles), California
- 1942: Jocelyn and Jan Domela House, Tarzana, California
- 1946: Park Planned Homes, Altadena, California
- 1947–48: Mar Vista Housing, Mar Vista (Los Angeles), California
  - designated as a Historic Preservation Overlay Zone by the city of Los Angeles in 2003.
- 1948: Avenel Homes (cooperative), Silver Lake, Los Angeles, California
  - listed in the National Register of Historic Places in 2005.
- 1948: Albert Tarter House, Los Feliz, Los Angeles, California
- 1948: Hollywood Guilds and Unions Office Building, Los Angeles, California (later destroyed)
- 1948: Miller House, Beverly Hills, California
- 1948: Community Homes (cooperative), Reseda (Los Angeles), California (unbuilt)
- 1949: Ain & Garrott Office, Silver Lake, Los Angeles, California
- 1949: Schairer House, Los Angeles, California
- 1950: Beckman House II, Sherman Oaks, California
- 1950: Hurschler House, Pasadena, California (later destroyed)
- 1950: MOMA Exhibition House, New York City
- 1950: Walter Ralphs House, Pasadena, California
- 1950-51: Briehl Medical Office Building, Beverly Hills, California
- 1951: Ben Margolis House, Los Angeles, California
- 1951: Leo Mesner House, Sherman Oaks, California
- 1952: Richard "Dick" Tufeld House, Los Angeles, California
- 1953 : Feldman House, Beverly Crest/Beverly Hills PO, California
- 1962–63: Ernst House II, Vista, California
- 1963: Kaye House, Tarzana, California
- 1967: Ginoza House, State College, Pennsylvania

== Awards and honors ==
- Guggenheim Fellowship, 1940
- American Institute of Architects College of Fellows (FAIA)

== See also ==
- Pirouette: Turning Points in Design – 2025 exhibition at the Museum of Modern Art

== Other sources ==
- McCoy, Esther (1984). The Second Generation. Gibbs Smith. ISBN 0-87905-119-1.
- Gebhard, David; Von Breton, Harriette; Bricker, Lauren Weiss (1980). The Architecture of Gregory Ain: The Play Between the Rational and High Art. University of California, Santa Barbara. ISBN 9780940512061.
