= Jack Hillmer =

American architect

Jack Hillmer (1918–2007) was an American architect based in San Francisco, California. An exponent of what Lewis Mumford called the "Bay Region style," Hillmer is known for his meticulously hand-crafted modernist homes built from redwood. Jack Hillmer's most notable projects include the Ludekens house on Belvedere island, the Munger house in Napa, and the Cagliostro house in Berkeley. Architectural writer Alan Hess called Jack Hillmer "one of the most original architects produced by California."

== Early life ==
Hillmer was born and raised in Texas. As a 15-year-old boy, he travelled to Chicago with his mother, a cousin and a friend to visit the 1933 World's Fair. It was there, in the California exhibit, that he encountered the redwood boards that would become a key feature of his later architectural practice: four-foot by twenty-foot planks displayed under spotlights to highlight one of that state's key products. Several years later Hillmer received a scholarship to the University of Texas, where he enrolled in architecture. After college, Hillmer joined the air force, and was stationed in San Diego. Hillmer used his time-off during the war to explore the new modernist buildings that were being built in southern California, including renting a room in the Pueblo Rivera Apartments by R. M. Schindler, and living for a time at the La Jolla Art Center by Irving Gill. Toward the end of the war, Hillmer visited Frank Lloyd Wright at Taliesen West in Scottsdale, Arizona. Hillmer was invited by Wright to join his Taliesen Fellowship, but Hillmer declined despite his appreciation for Wright's work.

Hillmer first visited the San Francisco Bay Area in 1945, when he flew up the coast to Hamilton Air Force Base to deliver a new bomber on which he had worked as a draftsman. Hillmer was transferred to Travis Air Force Base in Solano County, California toward the end of the war. After he was discharged, Hillmer decided to remain in the Bay Area, where he opened an architectural office with his friend Warren Callister at 425 Bush Street in San Francisco.

== Career ==
Hillmer and Callister's first commission was the Haines and Betty Hall house in 1947, a house with an abstract geometry built from redwood boards that were reclaimed from a dismantled barn on the property. The house would later be published in Life magazine.

Shortly after the Hall house was published, Callister and Hillmer dissolved their partnership and set up individual practices. Hillmer's first commission on his own came in 1948 from Fred Ludekens, a successful graphic artist who had purchased a lot on Belvedere Island with views across the Bay to San Francisco. Arguably Hillmer's most successful design, the Ludekens house featured rough redwood walls and airplane wing-like ceilings that soared above the walls of the building, seemingly supported only by glass. Shortly after its completion in 1951, the Ludekens House would be featured in Architectural Forum.

In the early 1950s, Hillmer was invited to teach as a lecturer at the University of California, Berkeley by the dean of the architecture school, William Wurster, and again in the 1960s by Charles Moore. Several significant commissions followed over the next three decades, including the Milton Munger house in Napa (1950), the Owen Stebbins house in Kent Woodlands (1960), the John and Patti Wright house in Inverness (1962), the Dominic Cagliostro house in Berkeley (1977) and rebuilt in 1994 after the Oakland hills fire and Dr. Poor House in Berkeley (1996).

== Style ==
Jack Hillmer's style is most closely identified with the Second Bay Tradition period of architecture in the California Bay Area. Hillmer's work is characterized by "bold exterior fascias and interior cornice lines [that] turn the structure into its own ornament. He hones unnecessary details to a minimum; window frames are typically absent; the glass is often embedded directly into the wood structure. This approach is thoroughly Modern. Beauty is drawn from the inherent structure itself rather than from applied carving."

Architect Pierluigi Serraino described Hillmer's architecture as "assertive, but it's always benevolent. It's always very delicate in the way it fits onto the site. It's not architecture that wants to scream, but it has its own monumentality."

In Hillmer's own words: "My approach to architecture was as an art. The approach of most other architects is as a business. I never really thought about how much money I was getting."
