= James H. Garrott =

American architect (1897–1991)

James Homer Garrott Jr.
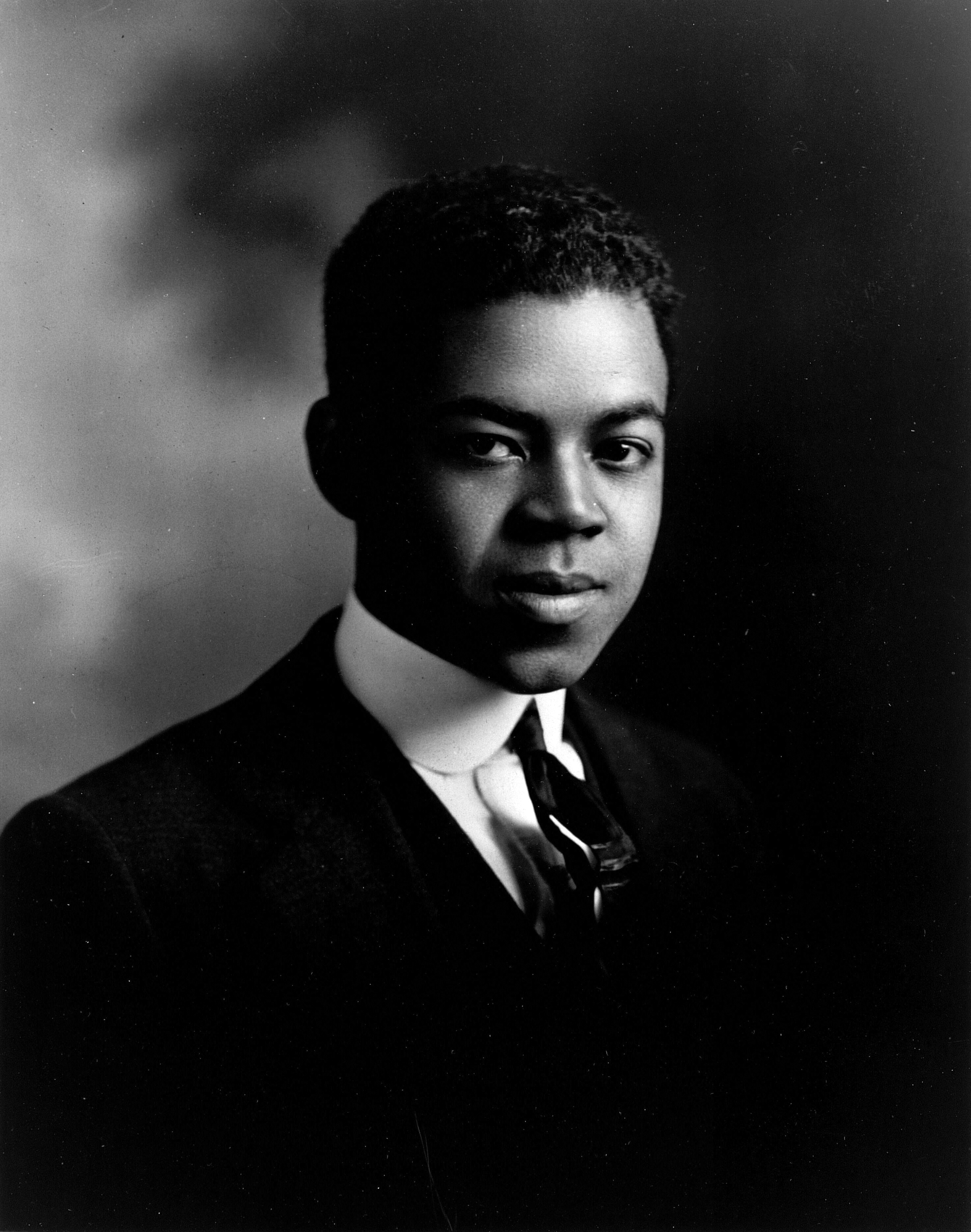
- Garrott, c. 1915
- Born: June 19, 1897; Montgomery, Alabama, U.S.
- Died: June 9, 1991 (aged 93); Los Angeles, California, U.S.
- Occupation: Architect
- Spouse: Helen Ruth Duncan (m. 1942; died 1973)

James Homer Garrott Jr. (1897–1991), was an American architect active in the Los Angeles area in the mid-20th century. He designed more than 200 buildings, including twenty-five churches and several public buildings. He has been described as a "pivotal black avant garde modernist of the 1940s era."

== Biography ==
James Homer Garrott Jr. was born on June 19, 1897, in Montgomery, Alabama. Garrott graduated from Los Angeles Polytechnic High School in 1917. He earned his architect's license in 1928. Garrott's first major achievement was as co-designer of the 1928 Golden State Mutual Life Insurance Company. From 1926 to 1928, Garrott worked with Cavagliere Construction Company of Los Angeles. He then studied Architecture at the University of Southern California from 1930 to 1934.

Garrott was a close friend of the eminent civil rights attorney Loren Miller. In early 1940, Garrott designed both of their Silver Lake split-level homes at 647 and 653 Micheltorena Street.

In 1946, Garrott was the second African-American admitted to the American Institute of Architects (AIA) in Los Angeles, after Paul R. Williams. His application was sponsored by Williams and Gregory Ain.

Garrott and Ain shared office space in the Granada Building beginning in 1940. Then they worked together in a "loose partnership" in the 1940s and 50s, and together designed a small office building that they shared in the Silver Lake neighborhood of Los Angeles. They were alternately “Garrott & Ain” or “Ain & Garrott,” depending on who was responsible for design, while on other projects they simply assisted each other's solo work without credit. After World War II, Garrott and Ain together designed and built their architectural office, at 2311 Hyperion Avenue, within walking distance from Garrott's home.

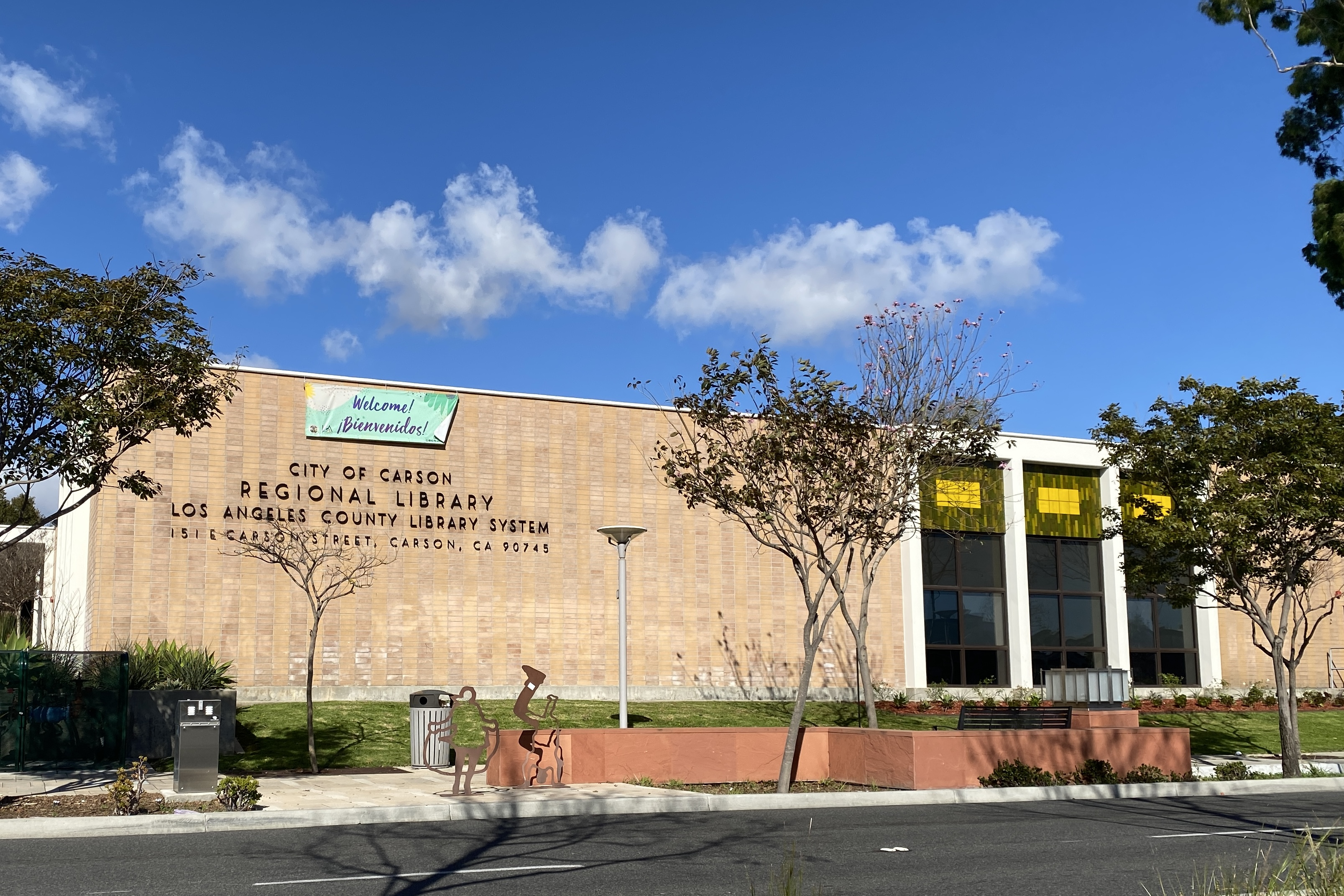
Carson branch, Los Angeles County Library, 1970

Garrott was “politically well connected” and received nine commissions from the Los Angeles County Government in the late 1950s. Yet the Los Angeles Tribune commented: "James Garrott, Paul R. Williams, and Carey Jenkins, are the only Negro architects ever to get a public contract in this slate ... and except for Williams they get them infrequently."

He died on June 9, 1991, in Los Angeles, California

== Buildings ==
- 1928: (with Louis Blodgett) Golden State Mutual Life Insurance Building, Los Angeles, California
  - listed in the National Register of Historic Places in 1998 (#98000712).
- 1929: (as Williams, Garrott & Young) St. Philip's Episcopal Church, Los Angeles, California
  - City of Los Angeles Historic-Cultural Monument #987
- 1936: Mount Zion Baptist Church, Los Angeles, California
- [before 1939]: George A. Beavers, Jr. residence, Los Angeles, California
- 1940: Garrott Residence/Loren Miller residence, Los Angeles, California
- 1940: Apartment building for Grace F. Marquis, Fifth and New Hampshire streets, Los Angeles, California
- 1944: Bethlehem Baptist Church (unbuilt project), Los Angeles, California
- 1948: Dental Building for Dr. George Hurd, Santa Monica, California
- 1949: (with Gregory Ain) Ain & Garrott Office, Silver Lake, Los Angeles, California
- 1950: John W. Bean & Verna Deckard residence, Los Angeles, California
- 1950: Moss Construction Co., Kenter Canyon, California
- 1950: (with Gregory Ain) Hamilton Methodist Church (unbuilt)
- 1951: (with Gregory Ain) Ben Margolis House, Los Angeles, California
- 1952: Harry Friedman & Bernice "Burr" Singer residence, Los Angeles, California
- 1953: M. Wesley Farr residence, El Segundo, California
- 1955: Firestone Sheriff's Station, Florence-Firestone, California
  - "considered the most modern law enforcement facility of its time."
- 1957: Lawndale Administrative Center, Lawndale, California
- 1958-60: (with Gregory Ain) Westchester Municipal Building, Los Angeles, California
  - David Gebhard described Garrott's design as “an anonymous building.”
- 1958-60: (with Gregory Ain) Loyola Village Branch Library, Los Angeles, California
- 1959: (with Gregory Ain) Ralph Atkinson residence, Monterey County, California
- 1960: Bodger County Park Director's Building, Hawthorne, California
- 1960: Del Aire County Park Director's Building, Hawthorne, California
- 1963: Victoria Park Pool and Bathhouse, Carson, California
- 1970: Carson Public Library, Carson, California

== See also ==
- African-American architects
