= The Negro Sailor =

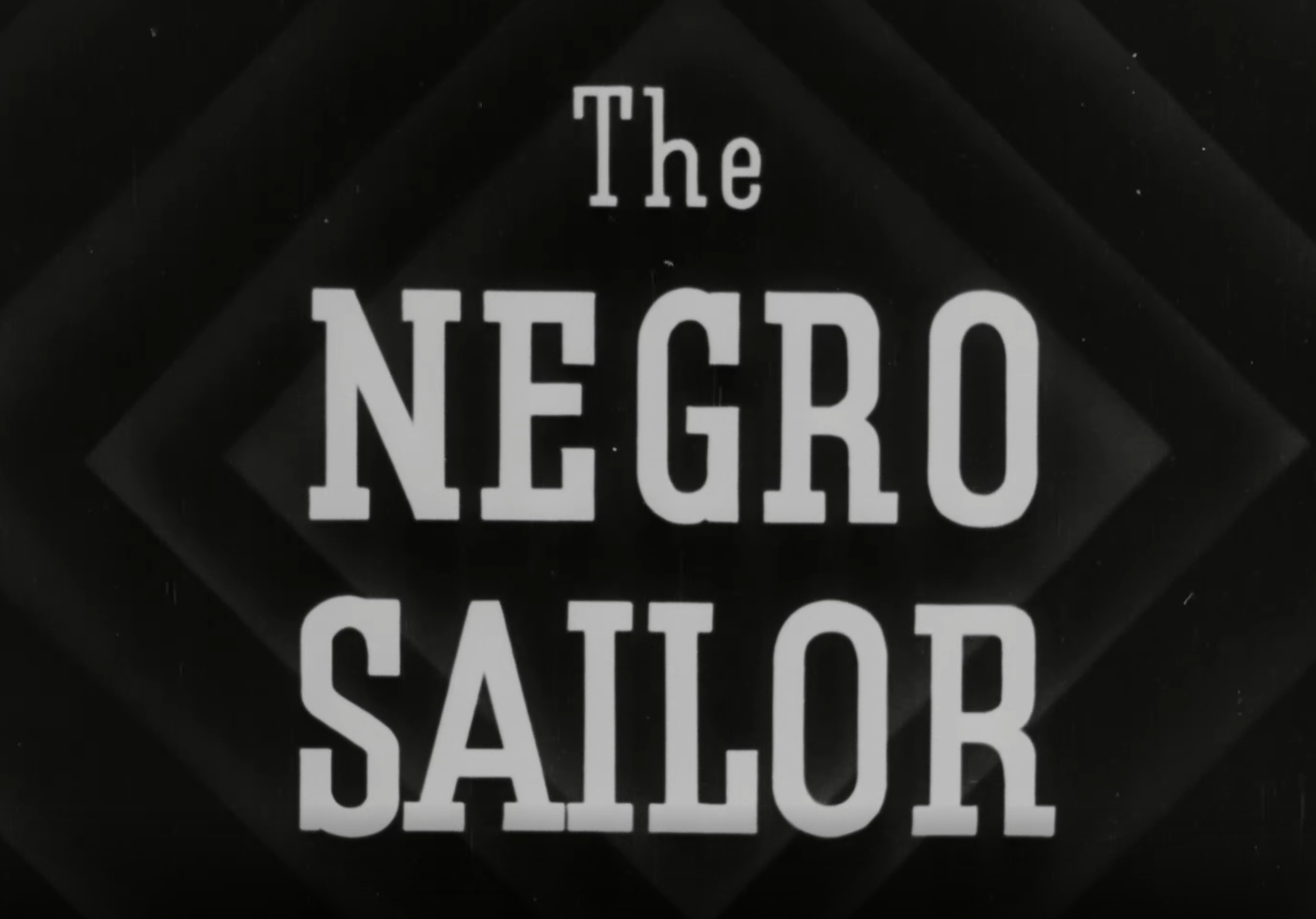
- Directed by: Henry Levin
- Cinematography: United States Navy
- Production company: Columbia Pictures
- Distributed by: All-American News
- Release date: July 14, 1945
- Running time: 27 Minutes
- Country: United States of America
- Language: English

The Negro Sailor is a 1945 documentary short film made for the U.S. Navy and shown by All-American News, a company producing newsreels and later feature films for the race film market. It was directed by Henry Levin. The film was inspired by the success of the film The Negro Soldier, and was one of only five films documenting the war time activities of African Americans in a positive light before 1950. Released after the surrender of Japan, the film highlights the service of African American seamen.

== Plot ==
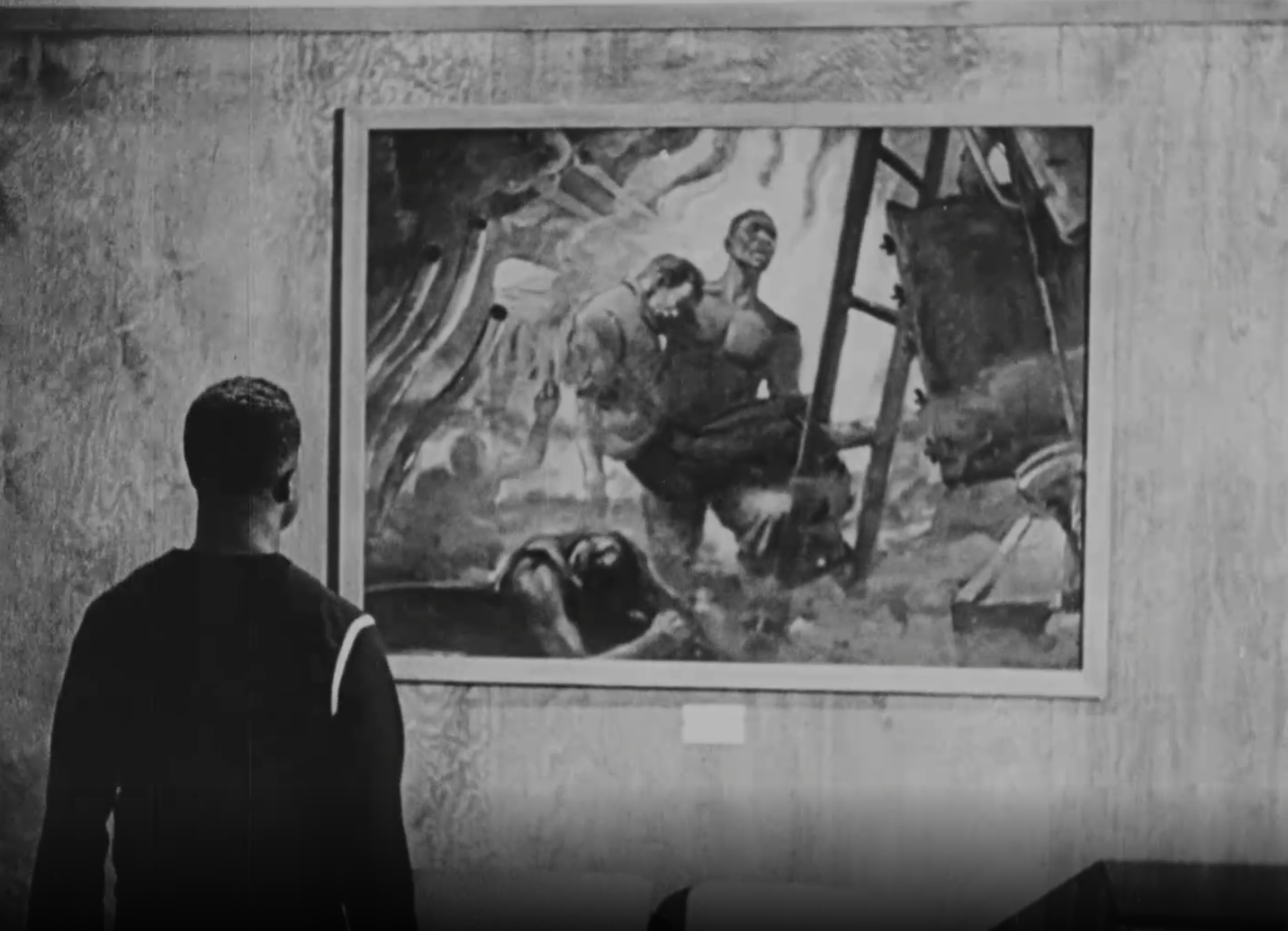
Bill learns about the heroism of William Pinkney

At an African American newspaper, employee Bill Johnson enlists in the U.S. Navy. Frank Roberts, the sports editor for the paper, convinces the newspaper's editor it would be a great idea for the paper to publish a column called "The Navy Team" where Bill would write about his experiences serving.

The film follows Bill from Recruit Training Command, Great Lakes, Illinois, including a spell in the brig, to a variety of technical training. Bill later serves on a ship escorting a destroyer with a crew of other African Americans working under white officers. The film mentions several black war heroes of World War II, including Navy Cross recipients William Pinckney for his actions at the Battle of Santa Cruz Islands, Doris Miller for his actions at Pearl Harbor, and Leonard Roy Harmon for his actions during the Naval Battle of Guadalcanal.

== Cast ==
- Joel Fluellen as Bill Johnson
- Spencer Williams Jr. as Frank Roberts
- Leigh Whipper as the Editor
- Monica Carter
- Joan Douglas
- Mildred Boyd
- Louise Franklin

== Production ==
The Negro Sailor was filmed at Columbia Studios and completed in July 1945.

== Release and legacy ==
The Negro Sailor (1945)

Caleb Peterson, Jr., the founder of the Interracial Film & Radio Guild, praised the Columbia Studios executives for including him in discussions in developing film. However, the film was also seen as "an attempt to polish the notoriously racist reputation of the navy—made worse by events such as the Port Chicago mutiny—among African Americans". And while this film and The Negro Soldier "acknowledged African Americans' contributions to America's military history, by overlooking the persistence of racial segregation in the armed forces, they implied that the black struggle for civil rights was complete".

The film is included as a supplement to releases of Harry Levin’s films The Family Secret and Convicted. The film was also released on a 2010 DVD set of race films and was restored in 2016.

The film is stored in the U.S. National Archives and Records Administration.

== See also ==
- The Negro Soldier
