= Jack Goldberg =

American film producer (c. 1889 – 1959)

- Born: c. 1889
- Died: 1959
- Occupations: Film producer, film director, talent manager, vaudeville performer

Jack Goldberg (c. 1889 – 1959) was an American film producer, film director, talent manager, and vaudeville performer. He started his career as in vaudeville, and became a producer of films starring African American casts for mixed race audiences. He led the Hollywood Pictures Corporation in New York City in 1945, and Herald Pictures in New York City in 1946.

== Life and career ==
Goldberg was white and Jewish. His brother Bert Goldberg ran Harlemwood Pictures in Dallas, Texas.

He married vaudeville singer Mamie Smith, in 1929. Goldberg had been her talent manager prior to their marriage.

Goldberg was known for producing "race movies", a genre of cheaply produced films for distribution at Black theaters. He also attempted to make films with all-African American casts for mixed race audiences. He was a supervising producer of the film Harlem is Heaven (1932). He produced the film Paradise in Harlem (1939), starring Mamie Smith, his wife.

Negro Marches On Inc. was a film production studio in New York City, led by Goldberg. In 1944, Goldberg signed a suit on behalf of his company Negro Marches On Inc. in attempts to stop the U.S. War Department and the War Activities Committee of the Motion Pictures Industry from releasing The Negro Soldier film, which he felt competed unfairly with his own film We've Come a Long, Long Way (1944). Lightfoot Solomon Michaux had co-produced and invested in the We've Come A Long, Long Way film. Goldberg ended up losing this lawsuit, however this movie was never a box office success. The New York Times published a review and characterized his film, We've Come A Long, Long Way (1944) as a rambling testimonial.

Goldberg founded Herald Pictures in New York City in 1946.

== Filmography ==
- Harlem is Heaven (1932), as supervising producer
- Scandal of 1933 (1933)
- Paradise in Harlem (1939)
- Sunday Sinners (1940)
- We've Come a Long, Long Way (1944), as director
- Boy! What A Girl! (1947), the first of 11 Herald Pictures films
- Sepia Cinderella (1947), as producer
- Miracle in Harlem (1948)

== See also ==
- African American cinema
- Vincent Valentini, screenwriter
