= William Pinckney =

American sailor (1915–1976)

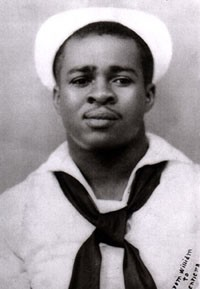
- Born: April 27, 1915; Dale, South Carolina, US
- Died: July 21, 1976 (aged 61); Beaufort, South Carolina, US
- Burial place: Beaufort National Cemetery, Beaufort, South Carolina, US
- Military career
- Branch: United States Navy
- Service years: 1938–1946
- Rank: Petty officer first class
- Unit: USS Enterprise (CV-6)
- Conflicts: World War II; Battle of the Santa Cruz Islands
- Awards: Navy Cross; Purple Heart

William Pinckney (April 27, 1915 – July 21, 1976) was a United States Navy sailor who was the second African-American to be awarded the Navy Cross, the second-highest decoration for valor in combat after the Medal of Honor. Pinckney received the medal for saving the life of a fellow crew member on board the USS Enterprise (CV-6) during the Battle of the Santa Cruz Islands. The Arleigh Burke-class destroyer USS Pinckney (DDG 91) is named in his honor.

== Early life ==
Pinckney was born in Dale, South Carolina, on April 27, 1915, to Renty and Jenny Pinckney. His father worked as a carpenter on shrimp boats while his mother died when he was eight years old. Pinckney attended school through the seventh grade then worked as a carpenter on shrimp boats before he joined the Navy.

== Naval career ==
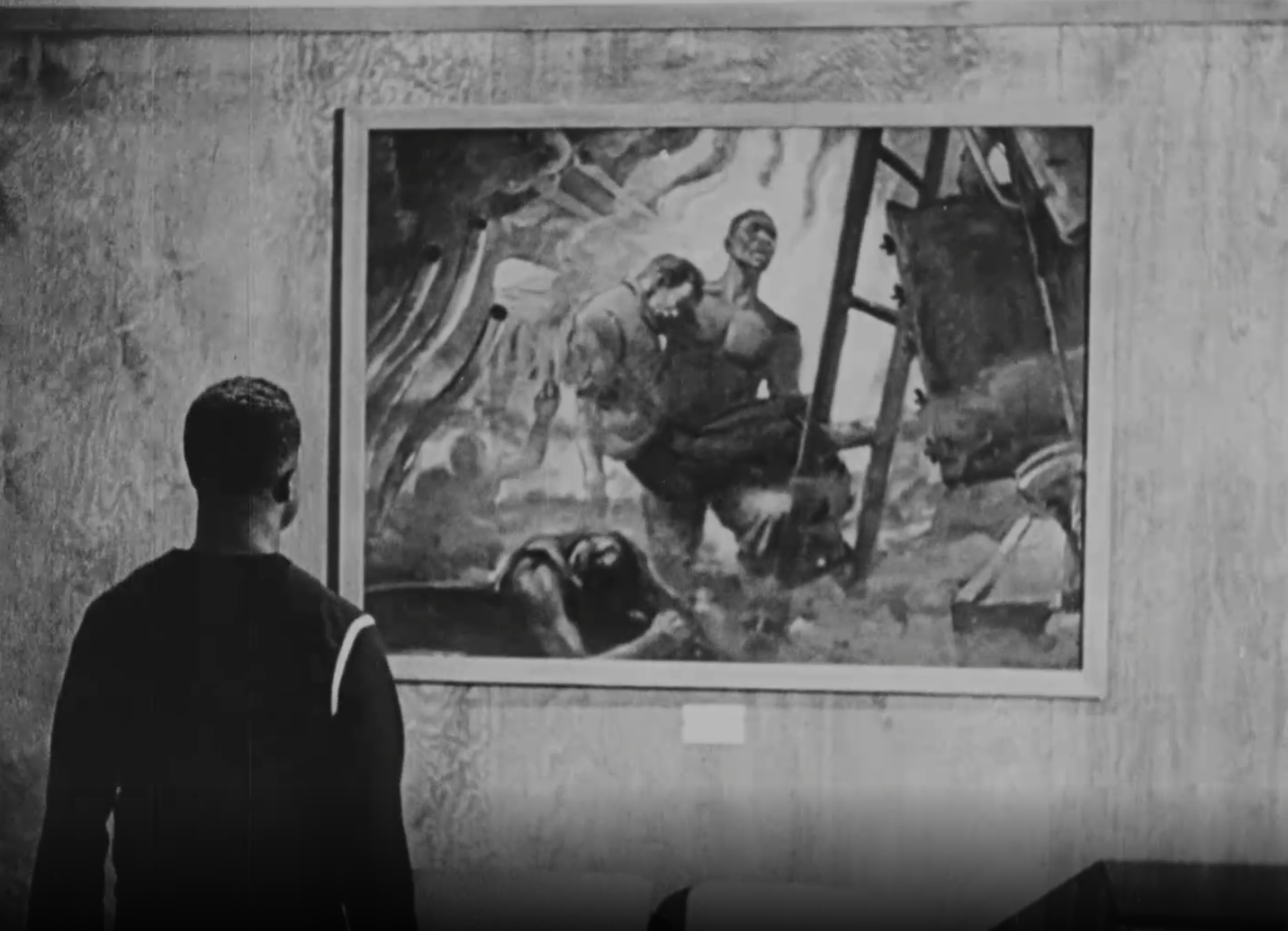
Image from the film The Negro Sailor with a painting showing Pinckney saving Bagwell's life

Pinckney enlisted on August 3, 1938, and attended boot camp at Great Lakes, Illinois. He then reported to the aircraft carrier USS Enterprise (CV-6) as a cook. At the time, cook was one of the few ratings open in the U.S. Navy to Black sailors.

While serving on the Enterprise, Pinckney took part in a number of battles including the Doolittle Raid, the Battle of Midway, and the Battle of the Eastern Solomons, where the carrier suffered three direct bomb hits that killed 74 sailors and wounded 95.

After repairs at Pearl Harbor, the Enterprise took part in the Battle of the Santa Cruz Islands in October 1942. On October 26, the ship was struck by two 250 kg bombs that killed 44 men and wounded 75. Pinckney's battle station was an ammunition handling room on the ship; when one of bombs penetrated the flight deck; the explosion knocked Pinckney unconscious and killed four of the other five sailors in the compartment with him.

When Pinckney regained consciousness, he discovered the compartments around him wrecked completely. He made his way through the burning wreckage to an open hangar deck hatch, where he found the only other surviving sailor, Gunner's Mate James Bagwell. The other sailor could not get up through the hatch and fell unconscious, so Pinckney pulled Bagwell over his shoulder and started climbing the ladder. During his first attempt, an electrical cable shocked Pinckney and he was thrown back and knocked unconscious again. When he regained consciousness, he grabbed Bagwell again and carried him through the hatch to safety. Pinckney then returned down the hatch to search for more survivors.

Pinckney received treatment in Hawaii for shrapnel wounds and third-degree burns before he spent the next four years at Naval Base San Diego. He left the Navy on June 30, 1946, as a Cook First Class.

Pinckney was one of only four African Americans to receive the Navy Cross during World War II.

== Post-Navy career ==
Pinckney later served for 26 years in the Merchant Marines as a cook.

== Personal life ==
While attending elementary school in South Carolina, Pinckney met his future wife, Henrietta. He asked Henrietta to her first dance when she was fifteen and married her eight years later in Beaufort on November 6, 1943.

Additionally, Pinckney was a Mason and a member of the American Legion. He died on July 21, 1976, after a two-year struggle with spinal cancer. He was buried in the Beaufort National Cemetery and was survived by his wife. They had no children.

Decades later, Beaufort historian and USCB professor Larry Rowland discovered that Pinckney's headstone did not mention him receiving the Navy Cross. In 2018, a new headstone was unveiled that listed the Navy Cross.

== Legacy ==
In 1943, Pinckney receiving the Navy Cross resulted in coverage across the United States, including in the New York Times, the Call and Post in Cleveland, the Detroit Evening Times, the Jackson Advocate and the Negro History Bulletin.

The 1945 documentary film The Negro Sailor also describes Pinckney's heroism and shows a painting of him saving Bagwell's life. It also honors Doris Miller and Leonard Roy Harmon.

In that same year, Senator James M. Mead gave a speech on the Senate floor about the "Service of Negroes in the Navy" in which he read Pinckney's award citation.

The Arleigh Burke-class destroyer USS Pinckney (DDG 91), commissioned on May 29, 2004, is named in his honor. In announcing the naming of the ship, Secretary of the Navy Richard Danzig said that Pinckney "embodied the Navy's value of selfless service, at a time when the institution undervalued black service members. His willingness to give so much, and sacrifice for an institution which gave him so little, makes these acts for which he earned the Navy Cross that much more heroic."

== Navy Cross citation ==
The President of the United States of America takes pleasure in presenting the Navy Cross to Ship's Cook Third Class William Pinckney, United States Navy, for extraordinary heroism and devotion to duty while serving on board the Aircraft Carrier U.S.S. ENTERPRISE (CV-6), in action against the enemy during the operations of the U.S. Naval Forces north of the Santa Cruz, Islands, on 26 October 1942. When a heavy bomb exploded in the near vicinity, Ship's Cook Third Class Pinckney, standing at his battle station in the ammunition handling room, was knocked unconscious. With several compartments completely wrecked and four of his five comrades killed, he, regaining consciousness, groped his way through the burning and tangled wreckage to a point under an open hangar deck hatch. Just as he was about to escape he found a shipmate, the only other survivor of his party, struggling up through the hatch. When the man fell unconscious, either from his wounds or from smoke fumes, Ship's Cook Third Class Pinckney, unmindful of his own danger, lifted his comrade through the hatch to safety before he himself battled his way out of the burning and smoke-filled compartment. By his dauntless courage in saving his comrade's life at great risk to his own, Ship's Cook Third Class Pinckney upheld the highest traditions of the United States Naval Service.
