= Carlton Moss =

American film director (1909–1997)

- Born: February 14, 1909; Newark, New Jersey
- Died: August 10, 1997 (aged 88); Los Angeles, California
- Education: Morgan State University
- Occupations: Screenwriter, film director

Carlton Moss (February 14, 1909 – August 10, 1997) was an African-American screenwriter, actor and film director. Moss directed the documentary Frederick Douglass: The House on Cedar Hill.

== Biography ==
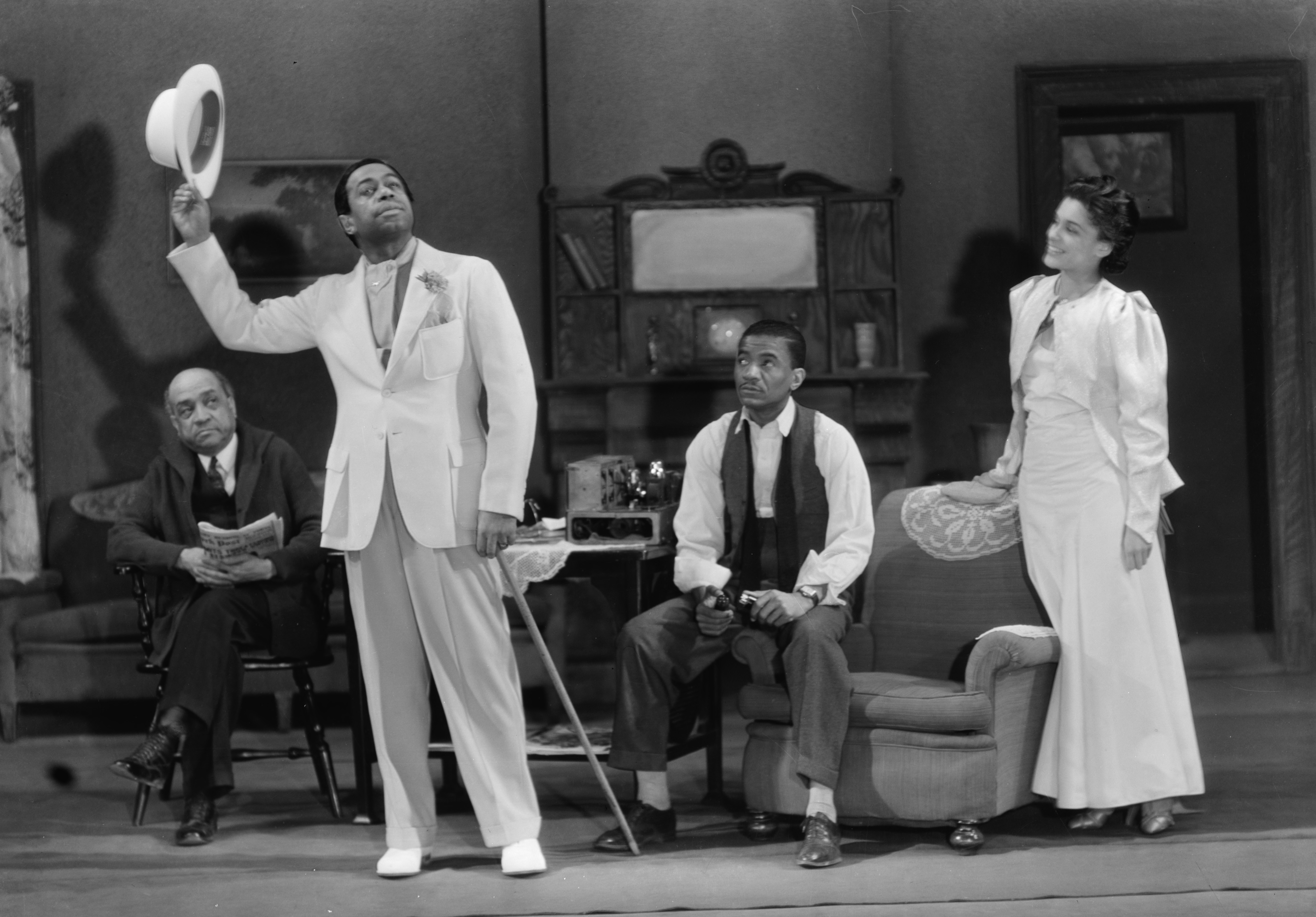
Moss directed the Federal Theatre Project revival of The Show-Off (1937), starring Dooley Wilson.

Moss was raised in both North Carolina and Newark. He attended Morgan State University, where he formed an acting troupe called "Toward a Black Theater". In 1936 he was one of a triumvirate of African-American theatre artists who led the Negro Theatre Unit of the Federal Theatre Project after the departure of John Houseman. Houseman recommended Moss for the position, later describing him as "skillful, progressive, educated and sensitive to every changing breeze of Harlem opinion." Moss directed a successful production of The Show-Off (1937), its first presentation under the new leadership, at the Lafayette Theatre.

Later he wrote The Negro Soldier for Frank Capra, a 1944 propaganda film encouraging racial harmony among World War II soldiers and specifically encouraging African-American men to enlist. After this film he became an important figure in independent cinema of African Americans. In 1944 Moss went to Europe and made the film Teamwork, a documentary about the work of an African-American quartermaster unit known as "The Redball Express". He had the chance to work with Elia Kazan on Pinky but left the project, as he felt it demeaning to blacks. He later taught as a guest lecturer at Fisk University in Nashville and as a professor at the University of California, Irvine in the Comparative Culture Program, and made educational films about African-American history.

== Filmography ==
- The Negro Soldier (1943)
- Teamwork (1944)
- Frederick Douglass: The House on Cedar Hill (1953)
- George Washington Carver (1959)
- Black Genesis: The Art of Tribal Africa (1970)
- Portraits in Black: Paul Laurence Dunbar: America's First Black Poet (1972)
- The Afro-American Artist (1976)
- Portraits in Black: Two Centuries of Black American Art (1976)
- Portraits in Black: The Gift of the Black Folk (1978)
- All the World's A Stage (1979)
- Drawings from Life: Charles White (1980)
- Forever Free (1983)
