= AN/SLQ-32 electronic warfare suite =

US Navy shipboard electronic warfare suite

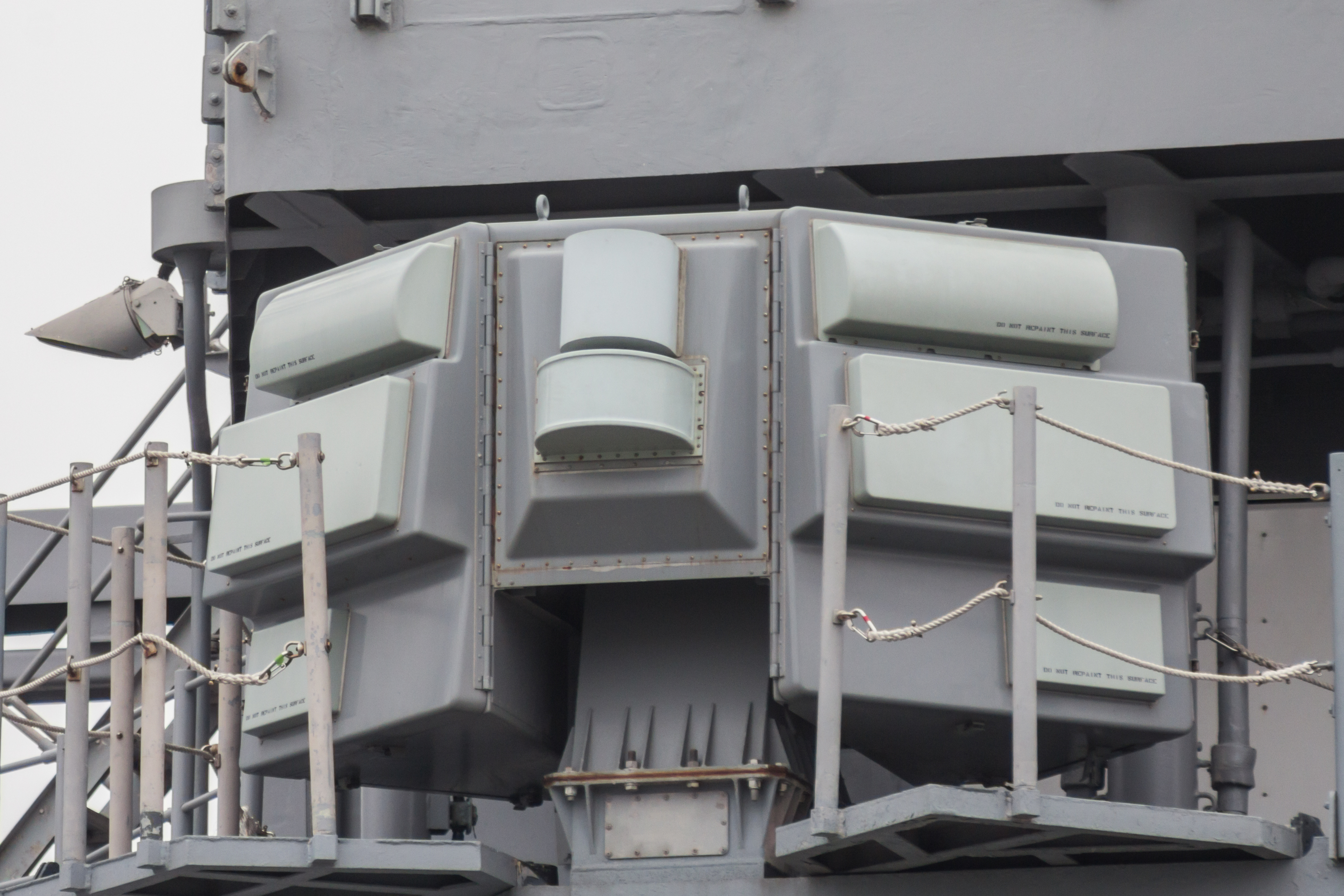
AN/SLQ-32(V)3 aboard USS Lake Erie (CG-70).

The AN/SLQ-32 is a shipboard electronic warfare suite built by the Raytheon Company of Goleta, California and The Hughes Aircraft Company. It is currently the primary electronic warfare system in use by U.S. Navy ships. Its operators commonly refer to it as the "Slick-32".

In accordance with the Joint Electronics Type Designation System (JETDS), the "AN/SLQ-32" designation represents the 32nd design of an Army-Navy electronic device for waterborne countermeasures special equipment. The JETDS system also now is used to name all Department of Defense electronic systems.

== Variants ==
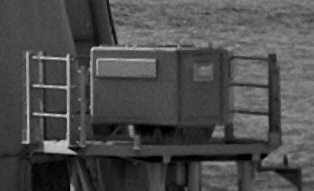
AN/SLQ-32(V)1 aboard USS Bowen (FF-1079).

The SLQ-32 was originally conceived in the 1970s to augment the AN/WLR-1, which had been in service since the early 1960s. It was later determined to save costs to replace the various WLR-1 series suites with the SLQ-32 as a stand-alone system. As originally designed, the SLQ-32 was produced in three variants, the (V)1, (V)2 and (V)3. Later in its service life, additional versions were built, the (V)4 and (V)5. Today, (V)6 and (V)7 versions are in production. The Air Transport Rack sized processors were supplied by ROLM Mil-Spec Computers in San Jose, California.

- AN/SLQ-32(V)1 – A simple threat warning receiver. It was capable of receiving low frequency, high-band radar signals of the type commonly emitted by anti-ship missile terminal guidance radars and long-range surveillance radars. The (V)1 was installed on auxiliary ships and small combatants like frigates. This variant of the system was phased out as equipped ships became decommissioned.
- AN/SLQ-32(V)2 – Initially the most common variant, the (V)2 expanded on the (V)1's capabilities with new receiving antennas for increased radio frequency coverage. It added the ability to detect high frequency targeting and fire-control radars, providing early warning against an imminent anti-ship missile attack. The (V)2 was installed on frigates, destroyers, and 270-foot (82 m) Coast Guard cutters. Many (V)2 suites have been upgraded to (V)3.

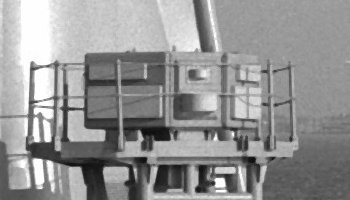
AN/SLQ-32(V)2 aboard USS Donald B. Beary.

- AN/SLQ-32(V)3 – The (V)3 added antennas with electronic attack capability, able to actively jam targeting radars and anti-ship missile terminal guidance radars. The (V)3 was installed on various combatants such as destroyers, cruisers, battleships, large amphibious ships, and high-value replenishment vessels. (V)3 systems are currently being replaced with (V)6.
- AN/SLQ-32(V)4 – Designed for installation on aircraft carriers, the (V)4 consisted of two (V)3 systems, one for each side of the ship, tied to a common computer and display console. Additional line replaceable units and software were added to support the wide separation of the two antenna/electronics enclosures. (V)4 systems will be replaced with (V)6.
- AN/SLQ-32(V)5 – The (V)5 was built as a response to the Stark incident in 1987. The (V)5 system incorporates a compact version of the (V)2 system along with an active jamming module—referred to as "Sidekick"—to the Oliver Hazard Perry-class frigates, which were too small to carry a full (V)3.
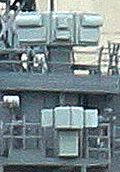
  (V)5 suite aboard PFG-1112, consisting of a compact (V)2 (top) and Sidekick jammer (bottom).
- AN/SLQ-32(V)6 – Part of the Surface Electronic Warfare Improvement Program (SEWIP). (V)6 provides enhanced electronic support capability through upgraded antennas and open combat system interface. It is made up of the SEWIP Block 1B2, SEWIP Block 1B3, and SEWIP Block 2, which provide specific emitter identification (SEI), high gain high sensitivity (HGHS), and electronic support (ES), respectively. (V)6 is currently in full-rate production for installation on the latest Arleigh Burke-class destroyers and for retrofit on existing ones, replacing their existing SLQ-32 equipment.

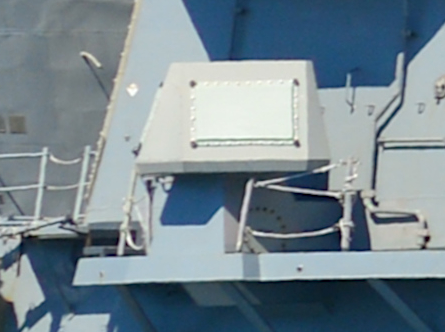
SEWIP Block 2, part of the SLQ-32(V)6, aboard USS Porter.

- AN/SLQ-32(V)7 – Adds onto (V)6 with the SEWIP Block 3, which upgrades electronic attack (EA) capability. As of 2022, it is in low-rate initial production. Select DDG Flight IIA vessels will receive AN/SLQ-32(V)7 as a part of the USN DDG MOD 2.0 program. USS Pinckney (DDG-91) is the first U.S. Navy surface combatant to receive the AN/SLQ-32(V)7 upgrade.

All versions of the SLQ-32, with the exception of the (V)4, are interfaced with the Mk 36 Decoy Launching System, able to launch chaff and infrared decoys under the control of the SLQ-32. A growing number of systems are being upgraded to incorporate the Australian-designed Mk 53 Nulka decoy launcher system.

The original modular design was intended to allow upgrades of the system from one variant to the next by simply installing additional equipment as required. Starting in the early 1990s, a program was begun to upgrade all SLQ-32s in the U.S. fleet. Most (V)1 systems were upgraded to (V)2, and most (V)2 systems were upgraded to (V)3. This was normally carried out during a major ship overhaul.

SEWIP Block 2 was tested on USS Freedom in December 2014, and as of 2022, the latest U.S. destroyers are fitted with (V)6. In 2023, USS Pinckney became the first destroyer fitted with SEWIP Block 3.

== Contract ==
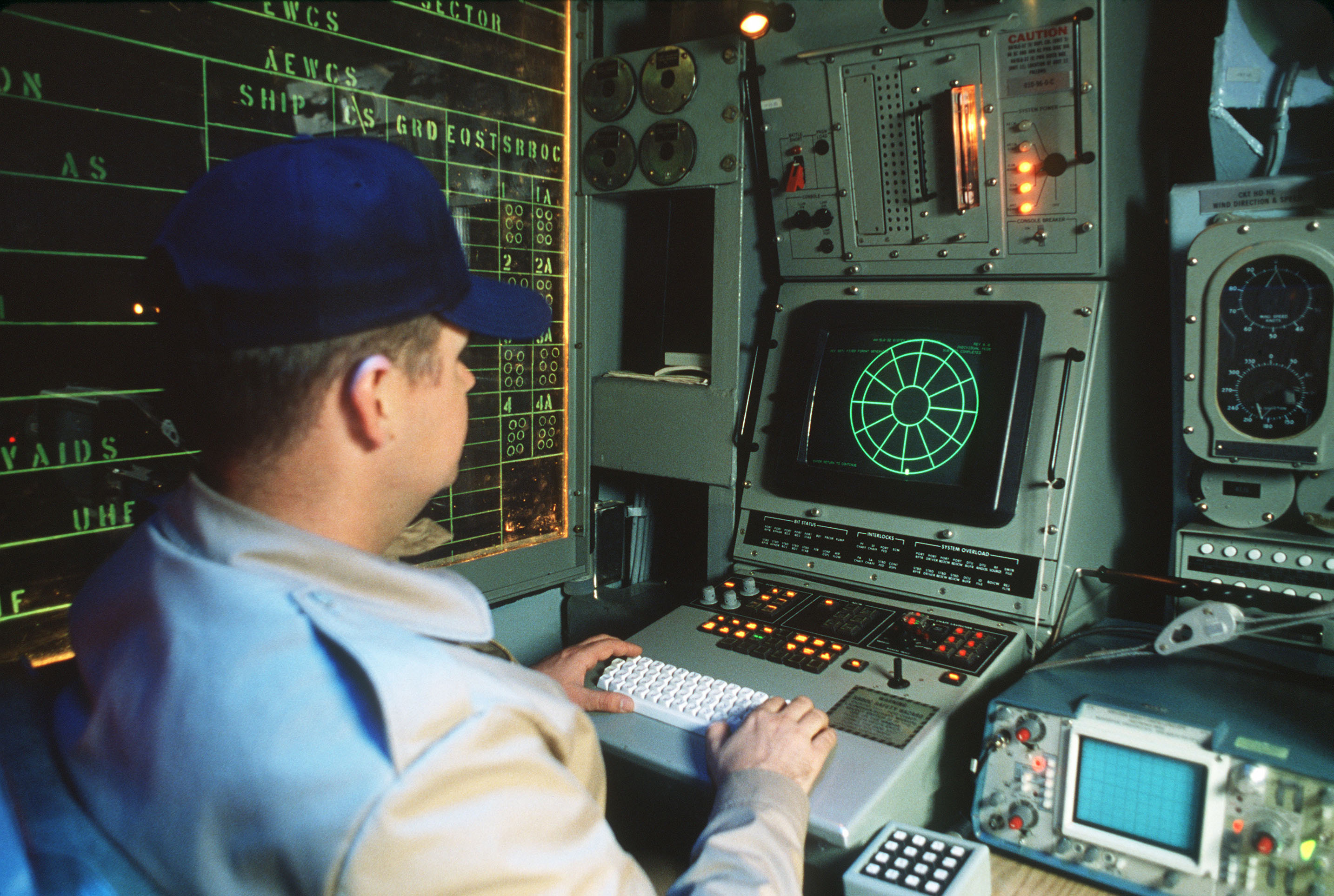
AN/SLQ-32 console aboard USS Iowa, 1984.

The initial procurement process was built around a “design to price” concept in which the final delivery cost per system was fixed in the contract. The SLQ-32 was designed to support the protection of ships against anti-ship missiles in an open sea environment. After initial deployment of the system, naval roles began to change requiring ships to operate much closer to shore in denser signal environments. This change in roles required changes to the SLQ-32 systems which were added over time. With experience gained working with the SLQ-32, coupled with improvements to the hardware and software, technicians and operators gradually overcame the initial problems. The SLQ-32 is now the mainstay of surface electronic warfare in the U.S. Navy and U.S. Coast Guard's WMEC 270-foot (82 m)-class ships.

== Future ==
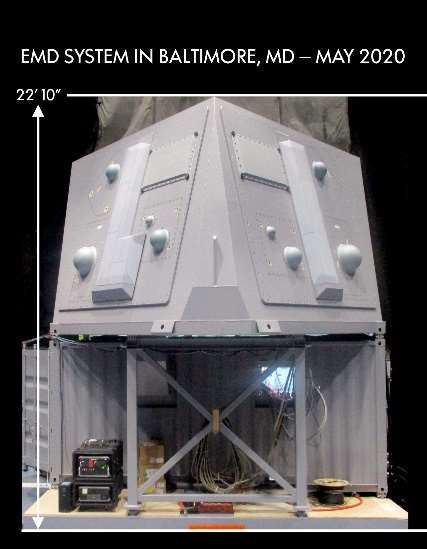
AN/SLQ-32(V)7 engineering development model.

In 1996, a program called the Advanced Integrated Electronic Warfare System (AIEWS) was begun to develop a replacement for the SLQ-32. Designated the AN/SLY-2, AIEWS reached the prototype stage by 1999, but funding was withdrawn in April 2002 due to ballooning costs and constant delays in the projects development. It has since been replaced with Surface Electronic Warfare Improvement Program (SEWIP), which will replace the existing SLQ-32 hardware and technology in an evolutionary fashion. As of September 2013, SEWIP Block 2 upgrades were first installed on Arleigh Burke-class destroyers in 2014, with full-rate production scheduled for mid-2015. Block 2 improved detection capabilities; better jamming is planned from 2017, but the 2013 sequestration cuts may push this date back a year.

As of November 2023, SLQ-32(V)7 (SEWIP Block 3) is undergoing low-rate initial production and being retrofitted on Flight IIA Arleigh Burke-class destroyers, replacing their existing SLQ-32 equipment. A future SEWIP Block 4 with electro-optic and infrared detection capabilities has been proposed. In September 2023, the first SEWIP Block 3 was fielded on USS Pinckney.

== See also ==
- ELINT
- List of military electronics of the United States
