= Prince Hall Masonic Temple (Washington, D.C.) =

- U.S. National Register of Historic Places
- U.S. Historic district – Contributing property
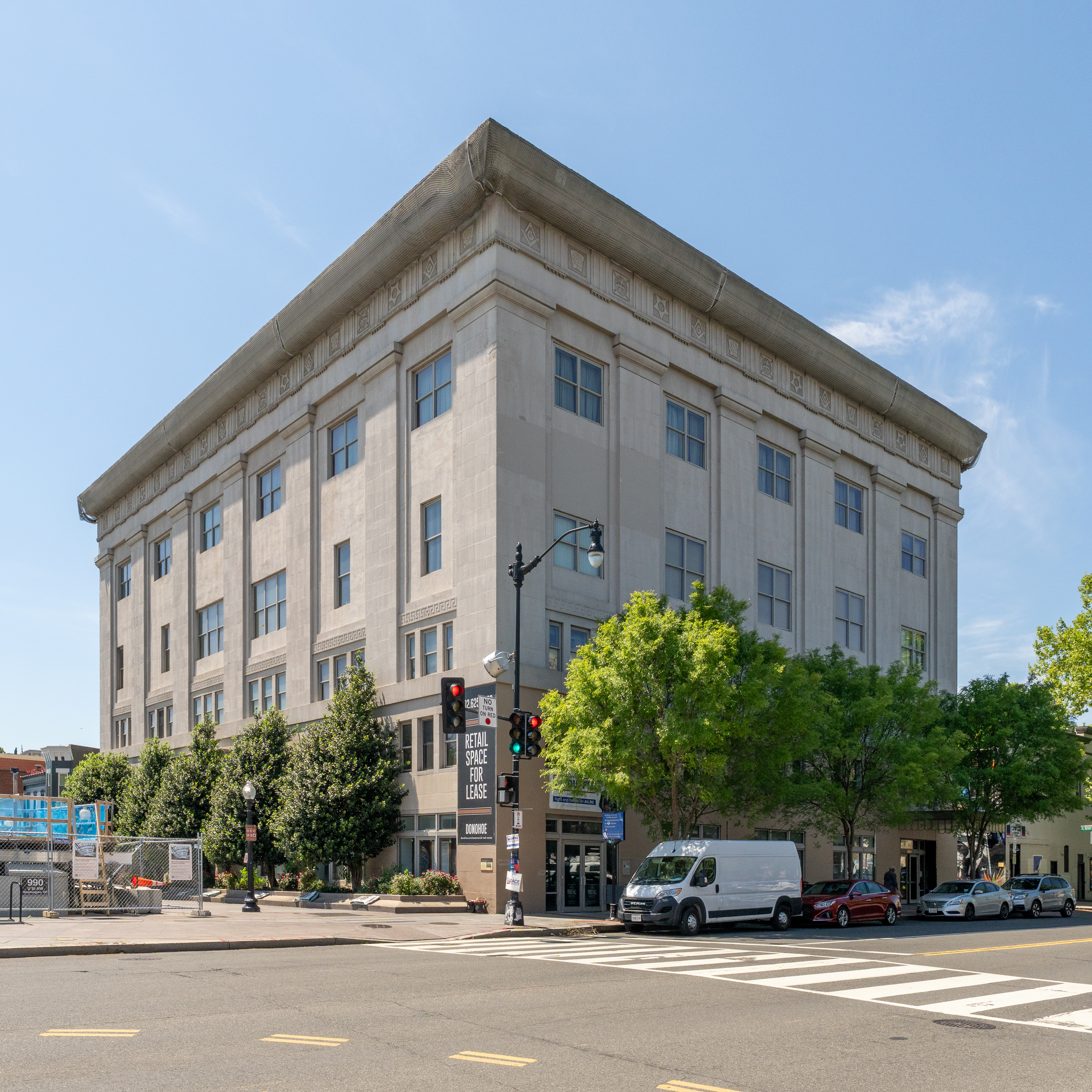
- Prince Hall Masonic Temple in 2026

- Location within Washington, D.C.
- Location: 1000 U St., NW, Washington, D.C.
- Coordinates: 38°55′0″N 77°1′35″W
- Area: 0.3 acres (0.12 ha)
- Built: 1922
- Architect: Albert I. Cassell
- Part of: Greater U Street Historic District (ID93001129)
- NRHP reference No.: 83001418
- Added to NRHP: September 15, 1983

The Prince Hall Masonic Temple, built in 1922, is a historic Prince Hall Masonic building located at 1000 U Street, NW, in Washington, D.C.. It serves as the headquarters of the Prince Hall Grand Lodge of the District of Columbia and houses the MWPGM Roland D. Williams Center for Masonic Excellence. The temple is a contributing property to the Greater U Street Historic District.

== History ==
The building was designed by architect Albert Cassell and constructed between 1922 and 1929.

In 1983, it was listed on the National Register of Historic Places.
