= USS Pinckney =

US Navy Arleigh Burke-class destroyer - Flt. 2A

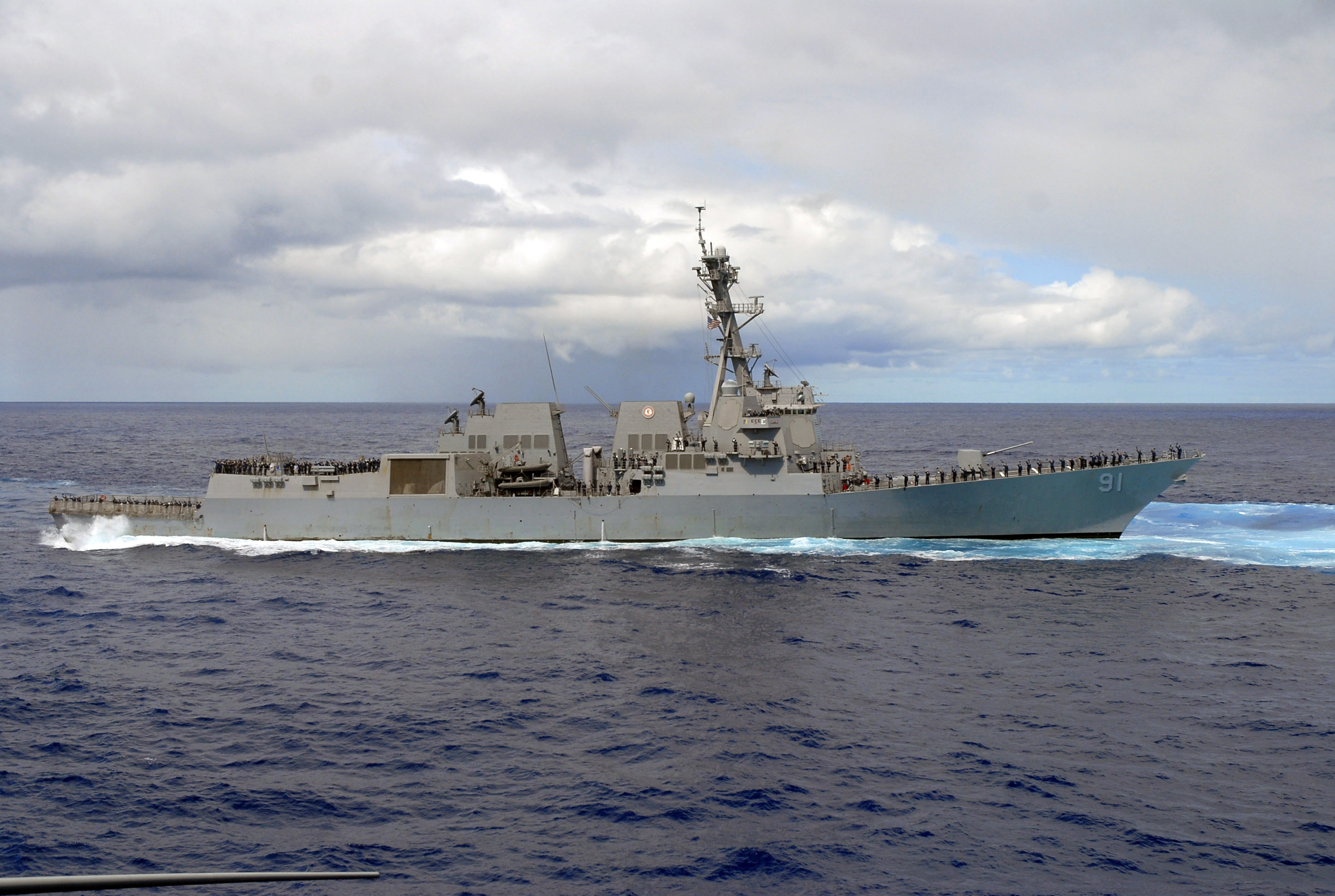
- USS Pinckney in 2007

History

United States
- Name: Pinckney
- Namesake: William Pinckney
- Ordered: 6 March 1998
- Builder: Ingalls Shipbuilding
- Laid down: 16 July 2001
- Launched: 26 June 2002
- Commissioned: 29 May 2004
- Home port: San Diego
- Identification: MMSI number: 369939000; Callsign: NPKN; Hull number: DDG-91
- Motto: Proud to Serve
- Honors and awards: See Awards
- Status: in active service
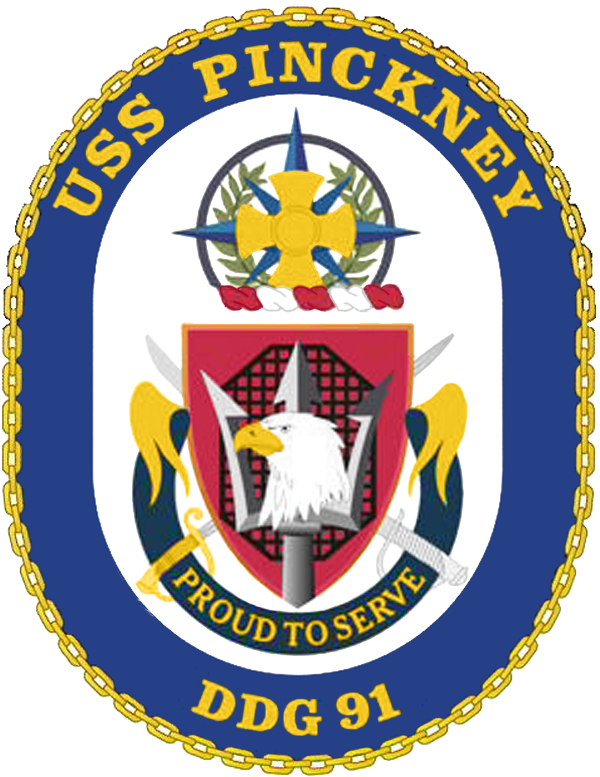
- Badge

General characteristics
- Class & type: Arleigh Burke-class destroyer
- Displacement: 9,200 long tons (9,300 t)
- Length: 509 ft 6 in (155.30 m)
- Beam: 66 ft (20 m)
- Draft: 31 ft (9.4 m)
- Propulsion: 4 × General Electric LM2500-30 gas turbines, 2 shafts, 100,000 shp (75 MW)
- Speed: >30 kn (56 km/h; 35 mph)
- Complement: 380 officers and enlisted
- Electronic warfare & decoys: SLQ-32(V)7 (SEWIP Block 3)
- Armament: Guns: 1 × 5-inch (127 mm)/62 Mk 45 Mod 4 (lightweight gun); 1 × 20 mm (0.8 in) Phalanx CIWS; 2 × 25 mm (0.98 in) Mk 38 machine gun system; 4 × 0.50 in (12.7 mm) caliber guns; Missiles: 1 × 32-cell, 1 × 64-cell (96 total cells) Mk 41 vertical launching system (VLS): RIM-66M surface-to-air missile; RIM-156 surface-to-air missile; RIM-174A Standard ERAM; RIM-161 anti-ballistic missile; RIM-162 ESSM (quad-packed); BGM-109 Tomahawk cruise missile; RUM-139 vertical launch ASROC; Torpedoes: 2 × Mark 32 triple torpedo tubes: Mark 46 lightweight torpedo; Mark 50 lightweight torpedo; Mark 54 lightweight torpedo
- Aircraft carried: 2 × MH-60R Seahawk helicopters

USS Pinckney (DDG-91) is an Arleigh Burke-class (Flight IIA) Aegis guided missile destroyer in the United States Navy. She is named for African American Ship's Cook First Class William Pinckney (1915–1976), who received the Navy Cross for his courageous rescue of a fellow crewmember on board the aircraft carrier Enterprise (CV-6) during the Battle of Santa Cruz.

Pinckney was laid down on 16 July 2001 by Ingalls Shipbuilding, at Pascagoula, Mississippi; launched on 26 June 2002; and commissioned on 29 May 2004 at Naval Construction Battalion Center Port Hueneme. She is the first Arleigh Burke-class destroyer to be equipped with the AN/SPY-1D(V) Littoral Warfare Radar upgrade, which was fitted to all subsequent Flight IIA Arleigh Burkes.

As of January 2018, Pinckney is homeported at NS San Diego, and assigned to Destroyer Squadron 23.

== Service history ==
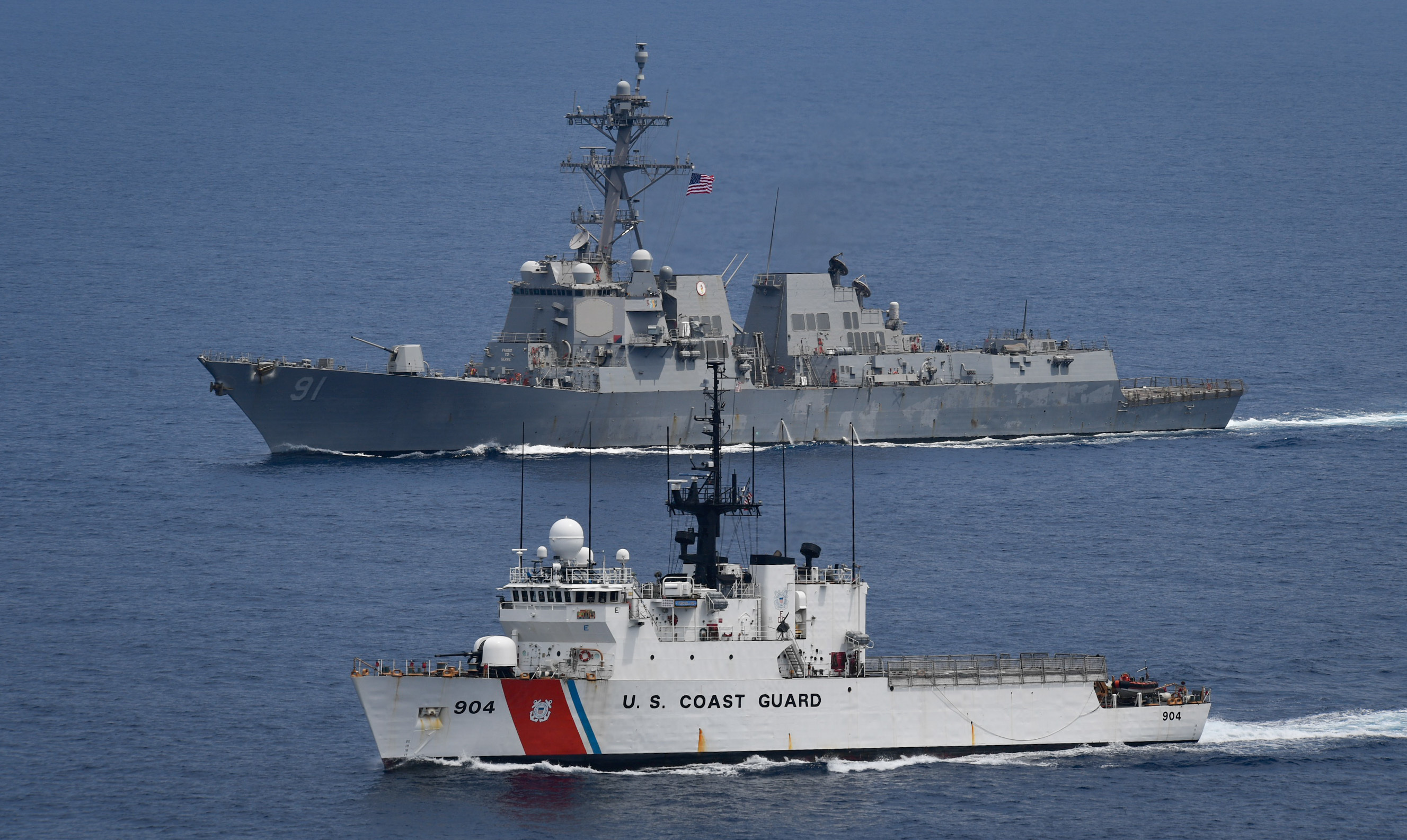
Pinckney and USCGC Northland train in the Pacific, April 2020

Pinckney made her maiden deployment September 2005. During this deployment, she made port visits to Guam, Singapore, Australia, Fiji and Hawaii. During this deployment, Pinckney became the first ever guided missile destroyer to refuel and replenish the Mark Five (MK V) high-performance combatant craft. She returned home after five months underway on 24 February 2006.

On 16 February 2007, Pinckney was awarded the 2006 Battle "E" award.

Pinckney departed San Diego on 2 April 2007 along with the aircraft carrier USS Nimitz for a 6-month deployment. She returned home on 30 September 2007.

On 8 March 2014, Pinckney was diverted from a training mission in the South China Sea, to the southern coast of Vietnam, to help search for the missing Malaysia Airlines Flight 370.

On November 7 2023, Pinckney was spotted in the San Diego harbor en-route to sea trials with the SEWIP Block 3 EW suite fitted to both sides of her superstructure after spending two years docked at the General Dynamics NASSCO shipyard in the San Diego Harbor.

In March 2025, Pinckney participated in Flight Test Other-40 (FTX-40), codenamed Stellar Banshee, in which a virtualized SM-6 Block IAU interceptor was tested against a live multi-stage MRBM test target that utilized a new and previously untested type of hypersonic warhead, designated HTV-1. The threat missile was air-launched by parachute drop from a C-17 Globemaster III transport, and was successfully detected and tracked by Pickney, though no actual physical interceptor missile was fired. The test validated a variety of systems, including modern hypersonic missile tracking satellites, the Block IAU version of SM-6, and the ability of the Aegis Weapon System to track hypersonic targets, and a new type of hypersonic test target.

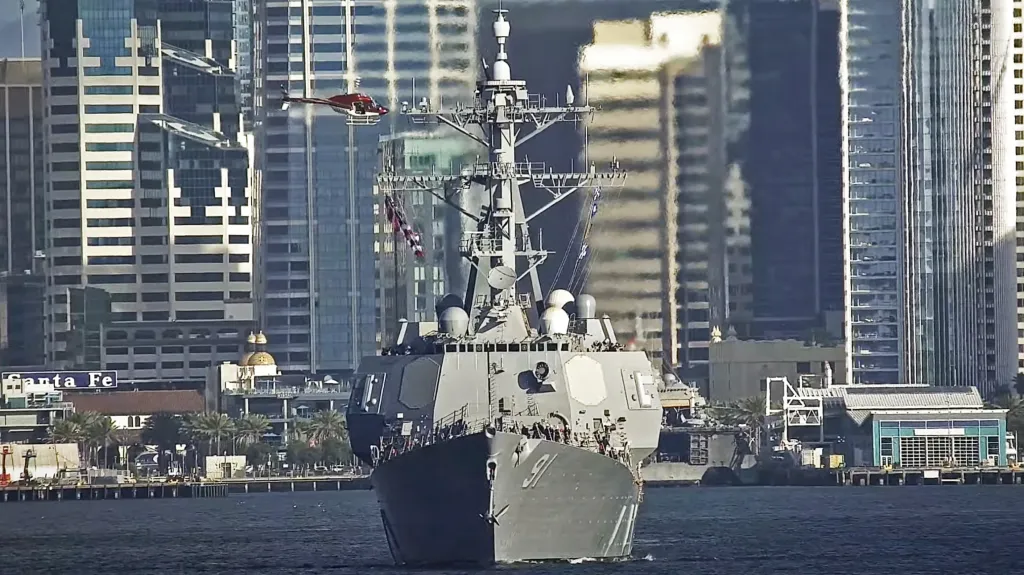
Pinckney near Naval Base San Diego with DDG MOD 2.0 program adding in the AN/SLQ-32(V)7 SEWIP Block 3 during 2025

USS Pinckney was scheduled for participation at the International Fleet Review 2026 held at Visakapatanam in India in February 2026,however she withdrew due to urgent operational demands.

=== Deployments ===
- September 2005-24 February 2006 Maiden deployment
- 2 April 2007 – 30 September 2007 Western Pacific
- 17 January 2020 – 5 October 2020 4th fleet

== Awards ==
- Navy Unit Commendation - (Jul 2009 – Mar 2010, Sep 2011 – Jan 2012, Jul 2012 – May 2013)
- Navy E Ribbon - (2006)
- Humanitarian Service Medal - (10–21 Dec 2009)
- Arizona Memorial Trophy - (2009–2010)

== Coat of arms ==
Shield

Gules, on a grid shaped as an Aegis shield Sable the head of a trident issuing from base Argent (Silver Gray); overall a bald eagle's head erased Proper.

Gules (Scarlet) denotes courage and sacrifice. The black grid shaped like an Aegis shield refers to the destroyer class to which the Pinckney belongs and its state-of-the-art equipment and armament. It also suggests a mess grill, symbolizing the duties of William Pinckney as Navy Cook Third Class aboard the USS Enterprise at the time of his heroic act in saving his shipmate. The trident symbolizes authority at sea. The eagle's head denotes vigilance, resolve and seagoing defense of the United States. White (Argent) indicates integrity; black (Sable) signifies strength and fortitude.

Crest

On a wreath Argent and Gules a laurel wreath Proper surmounted by a demi-compass rose Celeste; overall a stylized Navy Cross.

The Navy Cross indicates the award for heroism made to William Pinckney for his exemplary actions under fire in saving the life of a fellow sailor during the battle of Santa Cruz. The compass-rose signifies navigational expertise and global action during World War II. The wreath of laurel represents honor and achievement.

Motto

A scroll Azure fimbriated and inscribed "PROUD TO SERVE".

Seal

The arms as blazoned in full color upon a white oval enclosed within a dark blue collar edged on the outside with a gold chain of ninety-one links and one locking link (a canting reference to the ship's designation as DDG 91) with the name "USS PINCKNEY" above and "DDG 91" below in gold letters.
