= Scandal of 1933 =

Musical film

Scandal of 1933, also known as Gig and Saddle and Scandal, is an American film featuring musical performances. The 60-minute feature film includes performances of songs written by Irving Mills, Duke Ellington, Sam M. Lewis, Joe Young, Harry Akst, Roger Graham, Dave Peyton, Spencer Williams, Leo Robin, Ralph Rainger, Mort Dixon, Harry Warren, Lucky Millinder and his Orchestra, and Putney Dandridge. Jack Goldberg produced it and featured an all-African American cast. A poster for the film advertises it as a musical jamboree.
