= We've Come a Long, Long Way =

1944 American film

- Directed by: Jack Goldberg
- Produced by: Jack Goldberg; Lightfoot Solomon Michaux
- Color process: black and white
- Production company: Negro Marches On Inc.
- Distributed by: State Rights
- Release date: May 2, 1944 (U.S.)
- Running time: 70 minutes
- Country: United States
- Language: English

We've Come a Long, Long Way, is a 1944 American documentary feature-length film about the progress of African Americans and the need to support the United States military during World War II, directed by Jack Goldberg.

== History ==
We've Come a Long, Long Way was a documentary film designed to convey 75 years of Black American history between the Emancipation Proclamation in 1863 and up to World War II in the 1940s.

This film was loosely based on a pamphlet published by the U.S. Office of War Information in 1943 titled "Negroes and the War". Film production studio Negro Marches On Inc. and Jack Goldberg filed suit in federal court in April 1944 to prevent the distribution of the movie The Negro Soldier (1944) by the United States War Department and the War Activities Committee of the Motion Pictures Industry. Goldberg said the film competed unfairly with his own film released the same year, We've Come A Long, Long Way.

The film premiered in September 1943 at the Church of God, led by Lightfoot Solomon Michaux. The United States national release was on May 2, 1944, and it was re-released on July 1, 1944 at the World Theatre in New York City; the film had a long run on Broadway.

At the 16th Academy Awards in 1943, We've Come a Long, Long Way was selected on the preliminary list of 9 films for the award for documentary (feature), however it was not an official nomination.

== Reception ==
The National Association for the Advancement of Colored People (NAACP) called the film "disgusting and insulting" a few months before its national release and refused to cooperate in distribution. A Daily News film review concluded the movie left its theme of Black American documentary and focused on trying to convince Black Americans to fight Nazis in World War II, with an implied threat of what would happen if the Nazis won the war.

== Cast ==
- Lightfoot Solomon Michaux, as main narrator
- Mary McLeod Bethune, as narrator
- Major Richard R. Wright, as narrator
- Paul Robeson
- Bill Robinson
- Marian Anderson
- Joe Louis
- Count Basie
- Cab Calloway
- Duke Ellington
- Lena Horne
- George Washington Carver
