= Lightfoot Solomon Michaux =

American evangelist (1885–1968)

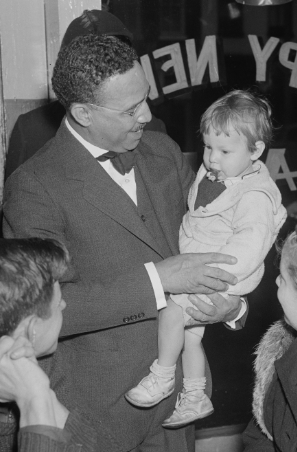
- Michaux in 1937
- Born: November 7, 1885; Newport News, Virginia
- Died: October 20, 1968 (aged 82); Washington, D.C.
- Resting place: Pleasant Shade Cemetery, Hampton, Virginia
- Spouse: Mary Eliza Pauline (m. 1906)

Lightfoot Solomon Michaux (November 7, 1885 – October 20, 1968) was an African-American evangelist. Michaux was an early pioneer in radio and television evangelism, an innovative real estate developer, an astute businessman, a newspaper publisher, restaurateur, and FBI collaborator. He founded seven East Coast Church of God congregations. He was also the founder of the National Memorial to the Progress of the Colored Race in America, an 1100-acre farm on the James River in James City County, Virginia.

== Early life ==
Michaux was born in Newport News, Virginia, to John Michaux and May Blanche. His father was a fish seller and grocer in downtown Newport News. Michaux dropped out of public school in the fourth grade in order to help with his father's business.

He eventually opened his own combination grocery store and dance studio, where he met his future wife, Mary Eliza Pauline. They were married in 1906. During World War I, Michaux obtained contracts to supply food to the defense department. In 1917 he moved his business to Hopewell, Virginia.

== Founding of the Church of God ==
Unable to find a church that suited him in Hopewell, Michaux, his wife, and a friend collaborated in 1917 to found a congregation called "Everybody's Mission". Michaux became ordained as a preacher in 1918 in the Church of Christ (Holiness) at the urging of his wife and began preaching in the church. He returned to Newport News at the end of World War I in 1919 and joined his father's business. During that year Michuax launched a gospel tent revival in Newport News with the goal of recruiting 150 congregants to a new church. He achieved this goal quickly and he and his congregants formed a Church of Christ (Holiness) congregation.

In 1921, Michaux's congregation split off to form an independent Church of God congregation in the Holiness Tradition, but independent of and separate from other Churches of God. Soon thereafter Michaux established a second Church of God congregation in nearby Hampton, Virginia. He also created the Gospel Spreading Tabernacle Association as a corporation to oversee the financial affairs of the church and related interests.

Michaux was arrested twice. In 1922 Michaux and some of his congregants were arrested in Newport News for singing too loudly early in the morning while walking through Newport News inviting people to church. He defended himself, lost, appealed, and lost again. He was fined. In about 1929 Michaux reacted to new segregation laws in Virginia by intentionally inviting white congregants from Maryland to his Newport News church for prayer. Michaux was arrested, and again defended himself. He quoted Scripture and claimed that the Bible did not support racial segregation and that segregation must end at the church door. He again was fined.

Michaux began moving up the East Coast, founding congregations as he travelled, and by 1935 had established a network of seven churches. By 1928 he had moved his church organization headquarters to Washington, D.C. The church organization that Elder Michaux founded is still in existence today and is known as the Gospel Spreading Church of God.

== Broadcast evangelism ==
In 1929 Michaux began broadcasting his religious message from radio station WJSV in Alexandria, Virginia. The "Happiness Hour" was a mixture of upbeat, syncopated gospel music performed by the Radio Choir, energetic holiness gospel sermons delivered by Elder Michaux, and inspirational themes related to the power of positive thinking. In 1932 WJSV was sold to the CBS Radio Network and the weekly program was syndicated and broadcast by more than 50 CBS-affiliated radio stations. The audience for the Saturday evening broadcasts was estimated to be as much as 25 million, making Michaux the most popular Black evangelical preacher to that time. The introductory theme song to the show was an upbeat version of a gospel song, "Happy Am I", which led to Elder Michaux becoming known as the "Happy Am I" preacher. His flamboyant, fast-paced, entertaining, theatrical radio shows attracted large audiences at home and internationally, and the live shows were attended by important political and cultural figures.

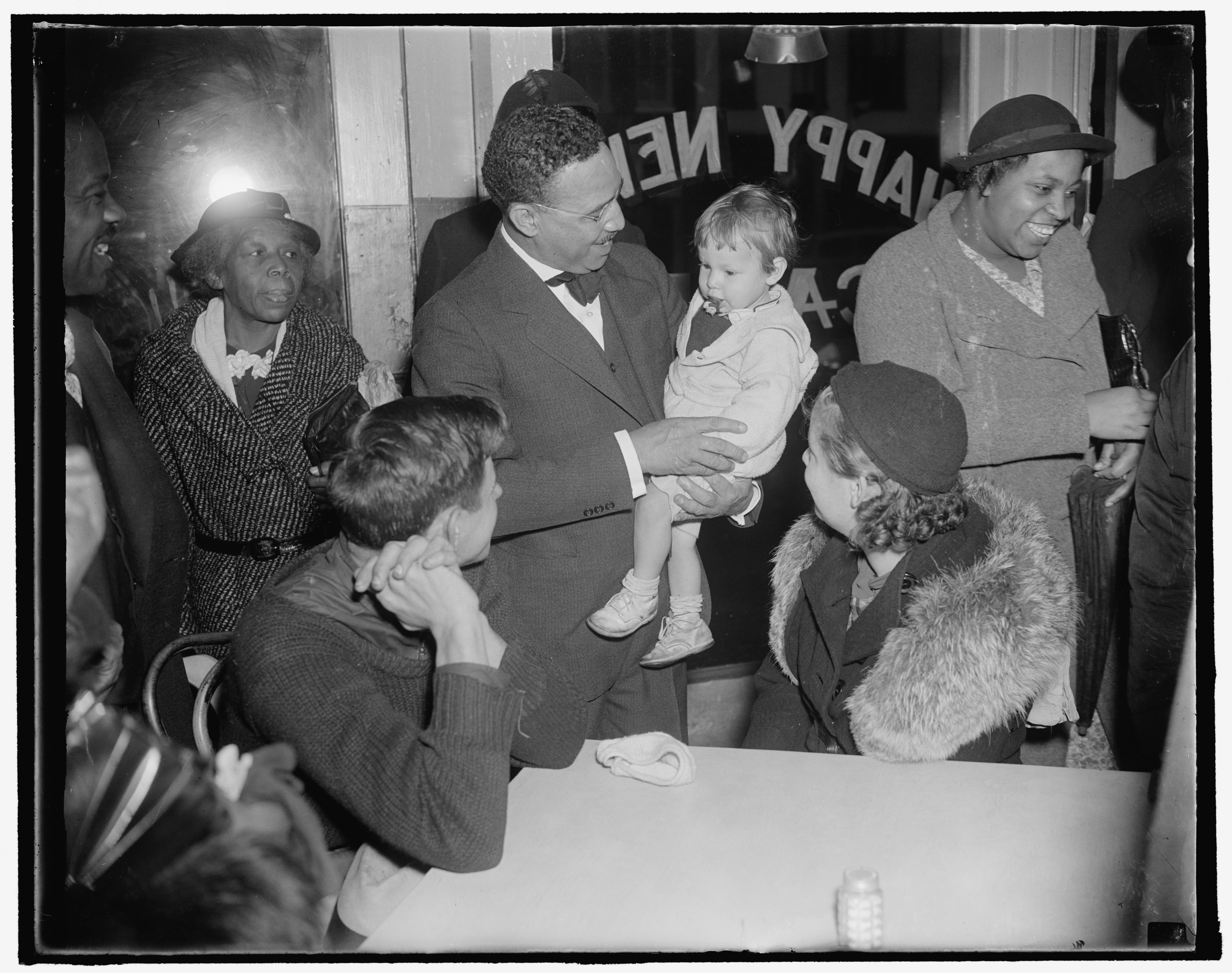
Elder Michaux at Happy News Cafe, 1727 7th Street

Michaux was interested in all manner of media and evangelism, including newspaper, television, and community outreach. He published a newspaper called the "Happy News". He contracted with the BBC for two broadcasts in 1936 and 1938, making him an early pioneer in international radio ministry. In 1947 Michaux began broadcasting the Elder Michaux program on television station WTTG which eventually was broadcast on the DuMont Television Network from 1948 to 1949. Elder Michaux was among the earliest U.S. television shows with an African-American host.

Michaux purchased a restaurant in Washington, the "Happy Cafe", where customers could work for a meal and be exposed to the gospel. He also organized large communal baptism events, most famously at Griffith Stadium in Washington, which attracted as many as 30,000 attendees.

== National Memorial to the Progress of the Colored Race in America ==
Beginning in 1936, Michaux and his various corporations began purchasing land along the James River near Jamestown Island in James City County, Virginia. Michaux envisioned a grand memorial to be developed on this land which would include "an Administration Building, a commodious Auditorium, a Library Building and a Hall of Fame, where will be preserved for all times, paintings, busts and statuary of the leaders of the Race in every field of service and high endeavor. This recognition will be an inspiration to the generations to follow, to emulate the examples of their fathers, who, given their freedom became loyal citizens of the States and the Republic, with the dedication of their lives in Peace and War."

Michaux invoked the history of African Enslavement, the historical significance of the founding of the colony at Jamestown and the landing of the first African slaves at Jamestown, and the historical evolution of the concept of human freedom as expressed by Washington, Jefferson, Madison and even Robert E. Lee in his description of the project. The Memorial site, which eventually grew to about 1,100 acres, is situated in Colonial National Historical Park adjacent to Jamestown, Williamsburg, and Yorktown—Virginia's "Historic Triangle", sometimes referred to as the "cradle of American democracy". It is possible that the earliest African slaves in Virginia and America worked on or near this land and that the land itself is the site of the first farm in Virginia owned by a former slave.

Michaux worked to develop funding for the project. One of the more intriguing proposals was to develop a cooperative farm on the property, subdivided into 5 acre lots that could be farmed by individuals who would be given cows, mules, chickens, and seed and who would work together, communally, to show the progress of Africans in America. None of the funding schemes that Michaux pursued were successful enough to develop the actual plans for the site. However, a working farm, including a dairy, was developed and maintained for the church and the association, under the stewardship of Marion O. Smith, a congregant of Michaux's in Washington who was sent to the farm in 1947 and remained active in the farm well into the 21st century. Mr. Smith's descendants still work the farm to this day.

An Historic Marker entitled "A Famous African-American Dream" was placed along the Colonial National Historic Parkway near Jamestown in 1992, commemorating Elder Michaux and his National Memorial.

== Real estate development ==
In about 1940 Michaux began developing plans for an urban housing development in Washington, D.C., targeted to the middle-class African-American market. He purchased property and obtained a $3.5 million loan from the Reconstruction Finance Corporation—at the time, the largest loan ever received by an American of African descent. The project, called Mayfair Mansions, was a 594-unit development designed by prominent African-American Architect Albert I. Cassell and was completed in 1946. Mayfair Mansions was listed in the National Register of Historic Places in 1989.

A second development called "Paradise Manor" was built adjacent to Mayfair Mansions by Michaux in 1964 with FHA funding in the amount of $6 million.

== Haiti ==
Michaux was part of a 1937 delegation of “colored” leaders who visited Haiti. The delegation caught the attention of the Roosevelt administration which assisted in setting up meetings with the Haitian government. The stated mission of the delegation was to spread "good will", but there seemed to be some hope that they might also improve Haitian American trade. No tangible economic changes resulted from this episode.

== Collaboration with the FBI ==
FBI records uncovered in 2018 detail a long relationship between Elder Michaux and the FBI. Beginning in the 1930's Michaux reached out to the FBI because he felt that he and the agency had similar values. Eventually, in the 1960's, Michaux collaborated with the FBI to discredit civil rights activist Martin Luther King, Jr.. Michaux himself felt that King's approach to race relations was overly divisive and destructive. The FBI, and in particular FBI director J. Edgar Hoover saw a communist threat in Dr. King's message and considered him a radical. Dr. King became a target of the FBI's Counterintelligence Program or COINTELPRO. Michaux became a "special correspondent" for the FBI and began to publicly oppose Dr. King in his sermons, using information provided to him by the FBI.

== Death ==
Elder Michaux died in Washington on October 20, 1968, after suffering a stroke. More than 3,000 people attended his funeral in Newport News. He is buried with his wife at Pleasant Shade Cemetery in Hampton.

== Filmography ==
- We've Come a Long, Long Way (1944), as main narrator
