= Mayfair Mansions Apartments =

- U.S. National Register of Historic Places
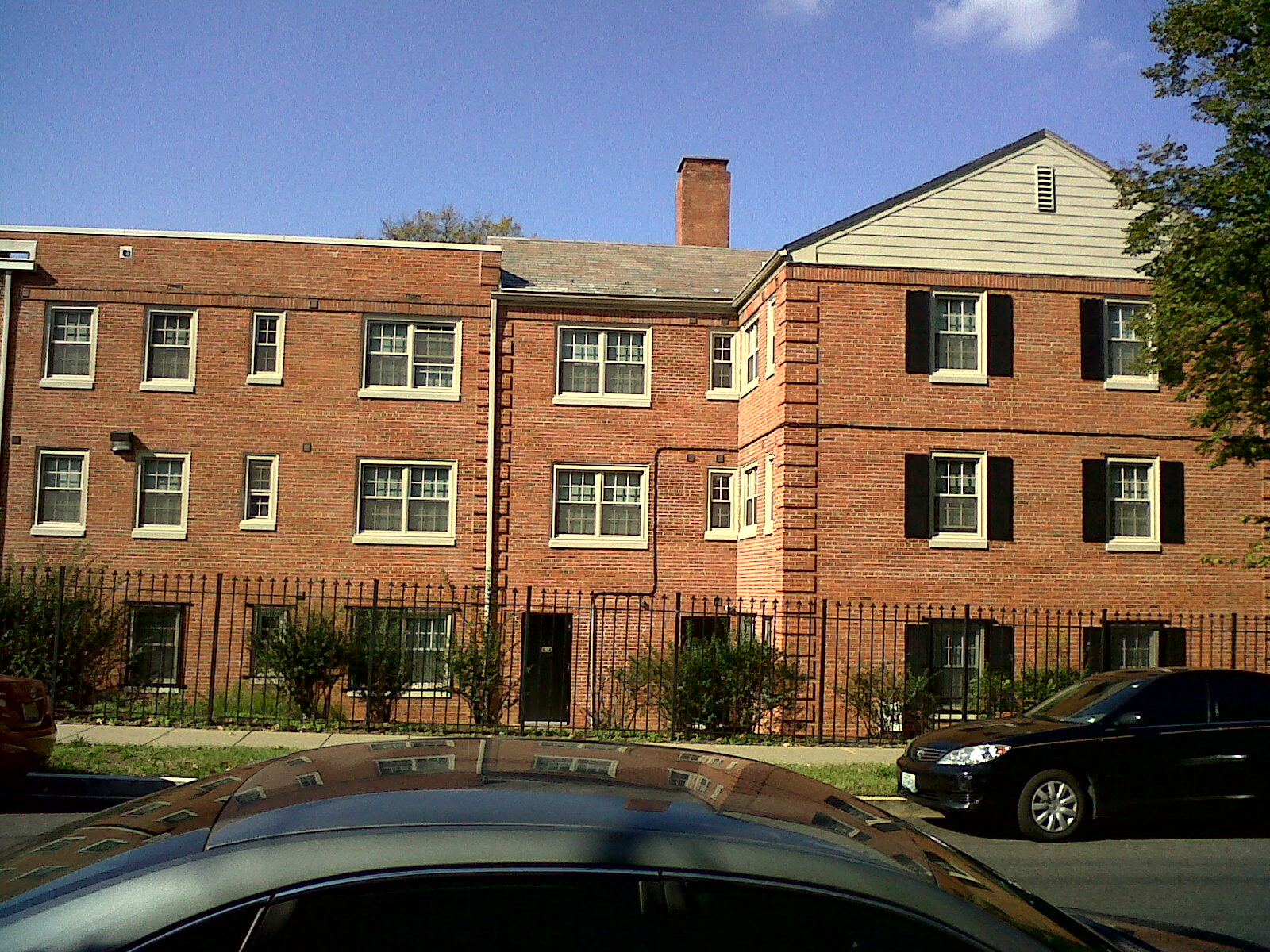

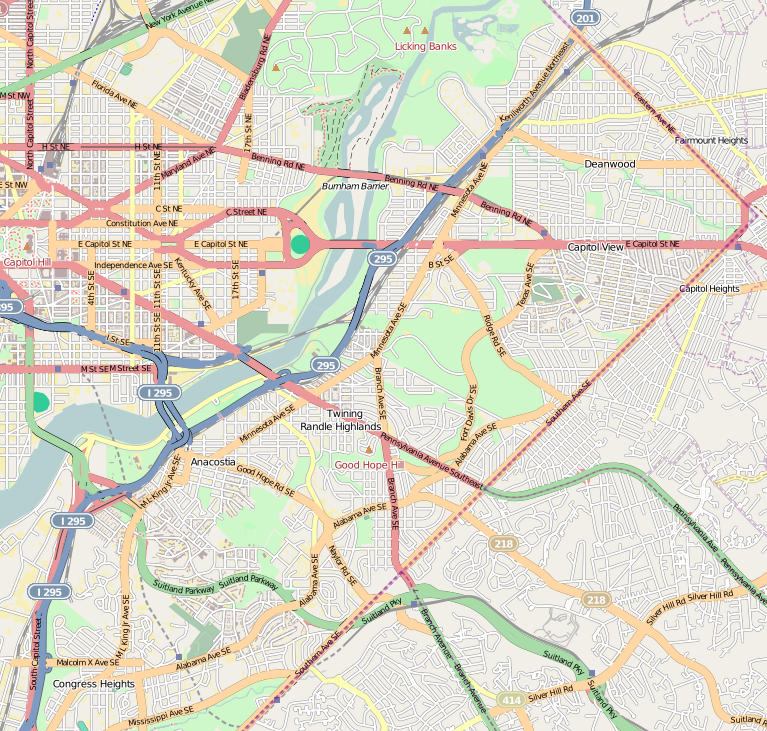
- Location within Washington, D.C. Location within the District of Columbia Location within the United States
- Location: 3819 Jay St., NE; Washington, DC
- Coordinates: 38°54′11″N 76°56′55″W
- Built: 1942–1946
- Architect: Albert I. Cassell
- Architectural style: Colonial Revival
- NRHP reference No.: 89001735
- Added to NRHP: November 1, 1989

Mayfair Mansions Apartments are historic structures in the Mayfair neighborhood of the Northeast quadrant of Washington, D.C. The garden apartments were built between 1942 and 1946 and were listed on the National Register of Historic Places in 1989.

== History ==
Mayfair Mansions were the project of radio evangelist Lightfoot Solomon Michaux. Albert I. Cassell, one of Washington's first professionally trained African American architects, designed the three-story buildings in the Colonial Revival style. They are among the first federally subsidized housing projects for African Americans in the United States. The complex was built on the former location of the Benning Race Track. The initial 571 units are now divided into two separate properties: Mayfair Mansions III composed of 160 units and another composed of the remaining 411 units. Mayfair Mansions III underwent a major renovation in 2011 and the other property was rehabilitated for $48 million in 2009.
