= USS Harmon (DE-678) =

Buckley-class destroyer escort of the United States Navy, in service from 1943 to 1947

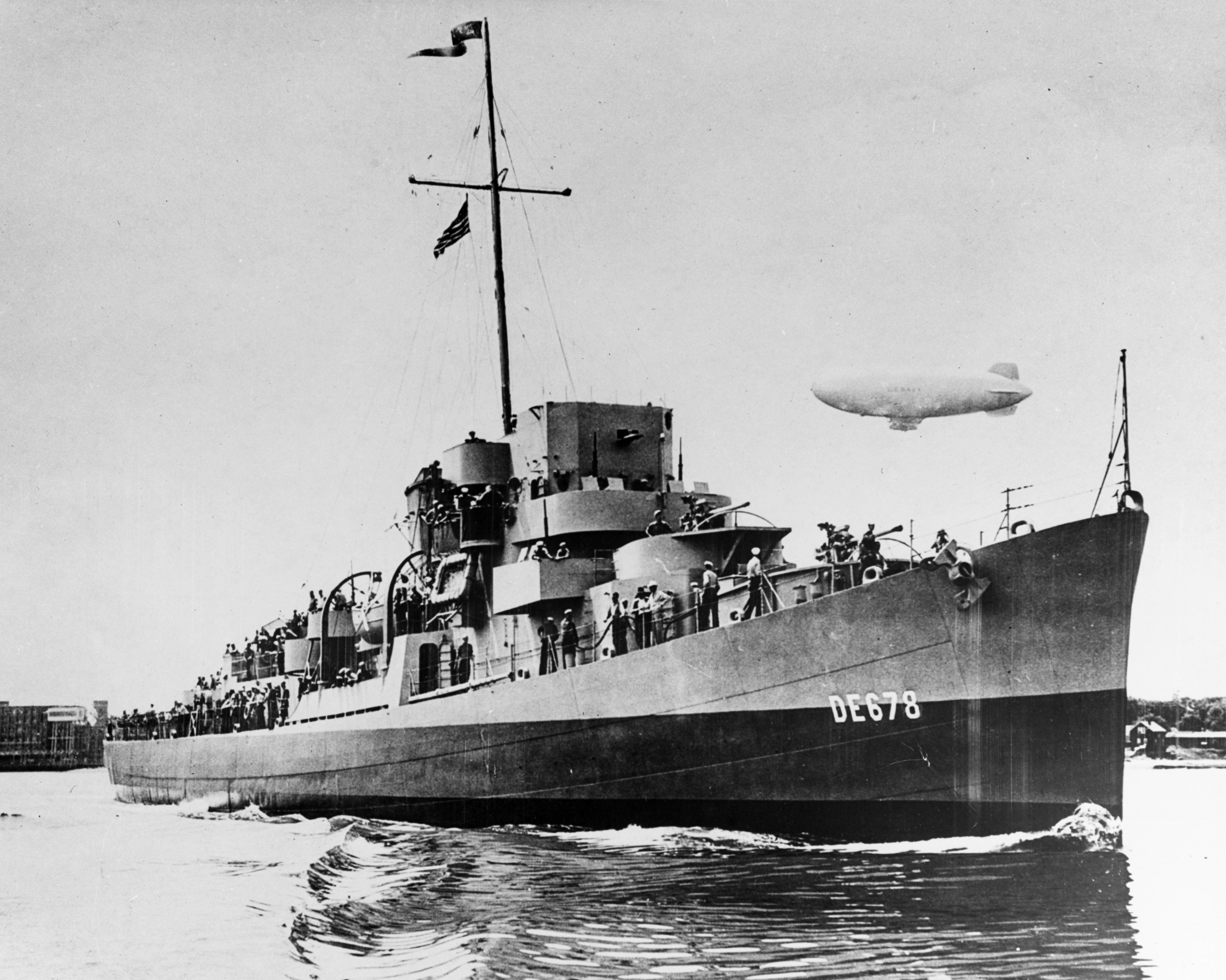
- USS Harmon

History

United States
- Name: USS Harmon
- Namesake: Leonard Roy Harmon
- Launched: 9 July 1943
- Commissioned: 31 August 1943
- Decommissioned: 27 March 1947
- Stricken: 1 August 1965
- Fate: Sold for scrap, 30 January 1967

General characteristics
- Class & type: Buckley-class destroyer escort
- Displacement: 1,400 tons light, 1,673 tons standard
- Length: 306 ft (93 m)
- Beam: 37 ft (11 m)
- Draft: 13 ft 6 in (4.11 m)
- Propulsion: Turbo-electric drive, 12,000 hp (8.9 MW)
- Speed: 23 knots (43 km/h)
- Complement: 213 enlisted and officers
- Armament: 3 3 in (76 mm)/50 caliber guns; 3 40 mm anti-aircraft guns; 3 21" torpedo tubes

USS Harmon (DE-678) was a Buckley-class destroyer escort of the United States Navy. USS Harmon was named after Mess Attendant Leonard Roy Harmon, who was posthumously awarded the Navy Cross for his actions on the cruiser USS San Francisco during the Battle of Guadalcanal. USS Harmon was the first warship to be named after an African-American.

== Service history ==
Harmon was launched 25 July 1943 by Bethlehem Steel Co., Quincy, Massachusetts; sponsored by Mrs. Nau-nita Harmon Carroll, mother of Mess Attendant Harmon; and commissioned 31 August 1943.

After shakedown out of Bermuda, Harmon departed Norfolk on 7 November 1943, and transited the Panama Canal to take up duty with the 3rd Fleet. Arriving Nouméa on 25 December, she remained in that area serving as escort ship until 18 September 1944, when she proceeded to Pearl Harbor for overhaul and training.

Harmon returned to Manus 24 November 1944, and joined the 7th Fleet as a unit of Admiral R. L. Conolly's Luzon Reinforcement Group. Harmon sortied from Manus 2 January 1945 with this large convoy and sailed through dangerous waters, arriving at the transport area on the eastern side of Lingayen Gulf on 11 January.

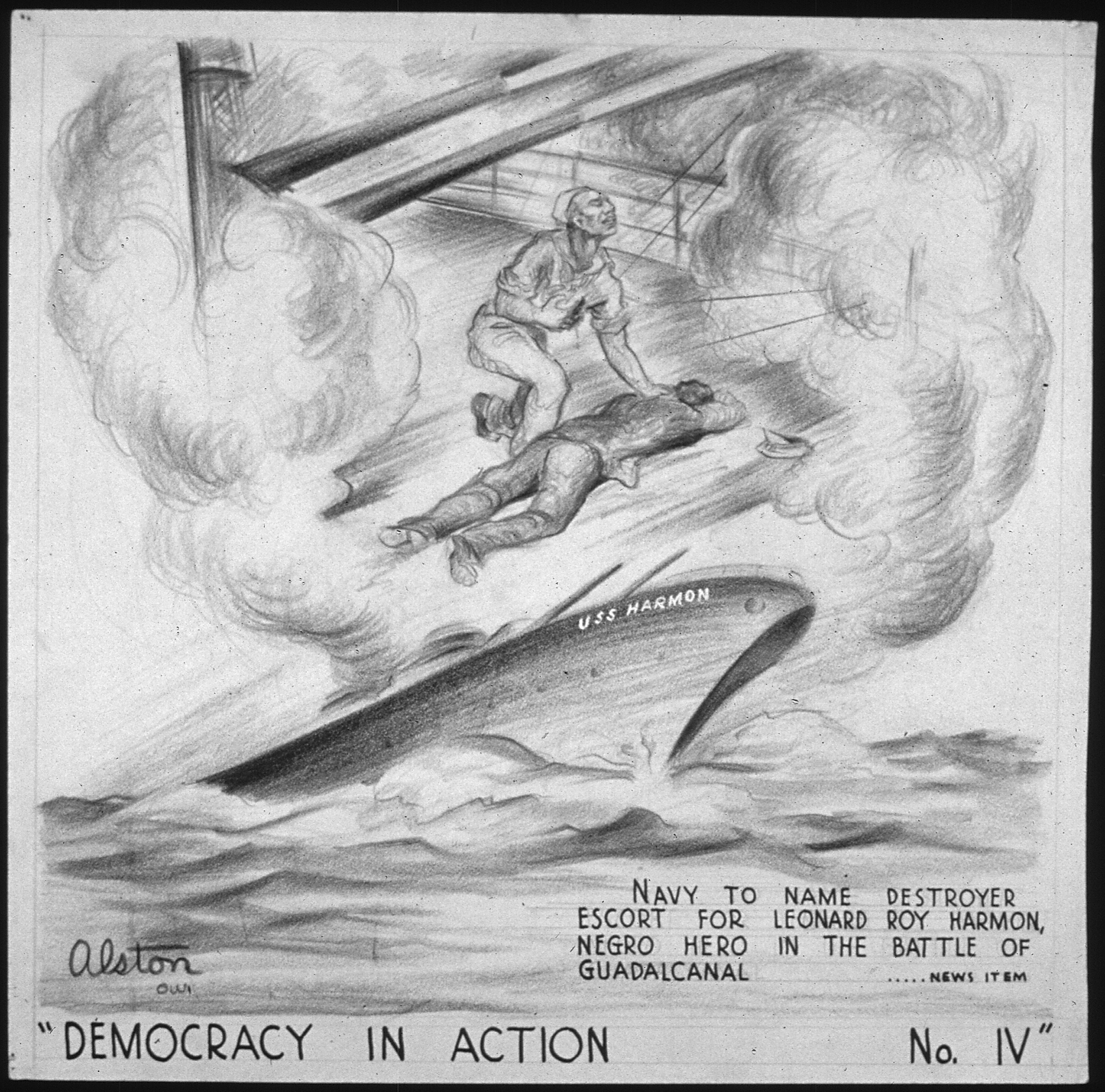
An Office of War Information poster from 1943 by Charles Alston depicting USS Harmon and its namesake

On 5 March Harmon arrived off Iwo Jima to act as escort and antisubmarine screen. This duty lasted until 27 March 1945, when she proceeded to Pearl Harbor and reported to the 1st Fleet for training. She remained there until August when Harmon was ordered to Mare Island to increase her firepower by replacing her 3-inch (76 mm) guns with 5-inch mounts.

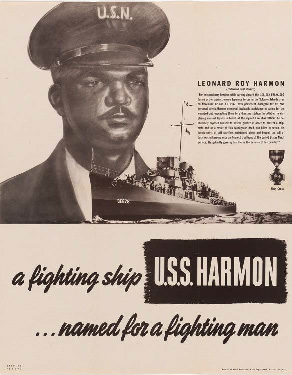
A U.S. Printing Office poster depicting USS Harmon and her namesake on display in the National Portrait Gallery in Washington, DC.

The war over, Harmon departed San Diego on 7 January 1946 for the Canal Zone where she conducted training operations with submarines. Clearing Cristobal 28 March, Harmon arrived in New London 3 April 1946. Here she trained with submarines until December, then decommissioned at Green Cove Springs, Florida on 25 March 1947, and joined the Atlantic Reserve Fleet. Harmon was struck from the Navy Directory on 1 August 1965, and sold to North American Smelting Co., Wilmington, Delaware on 30 January 1967 to be scrapped.

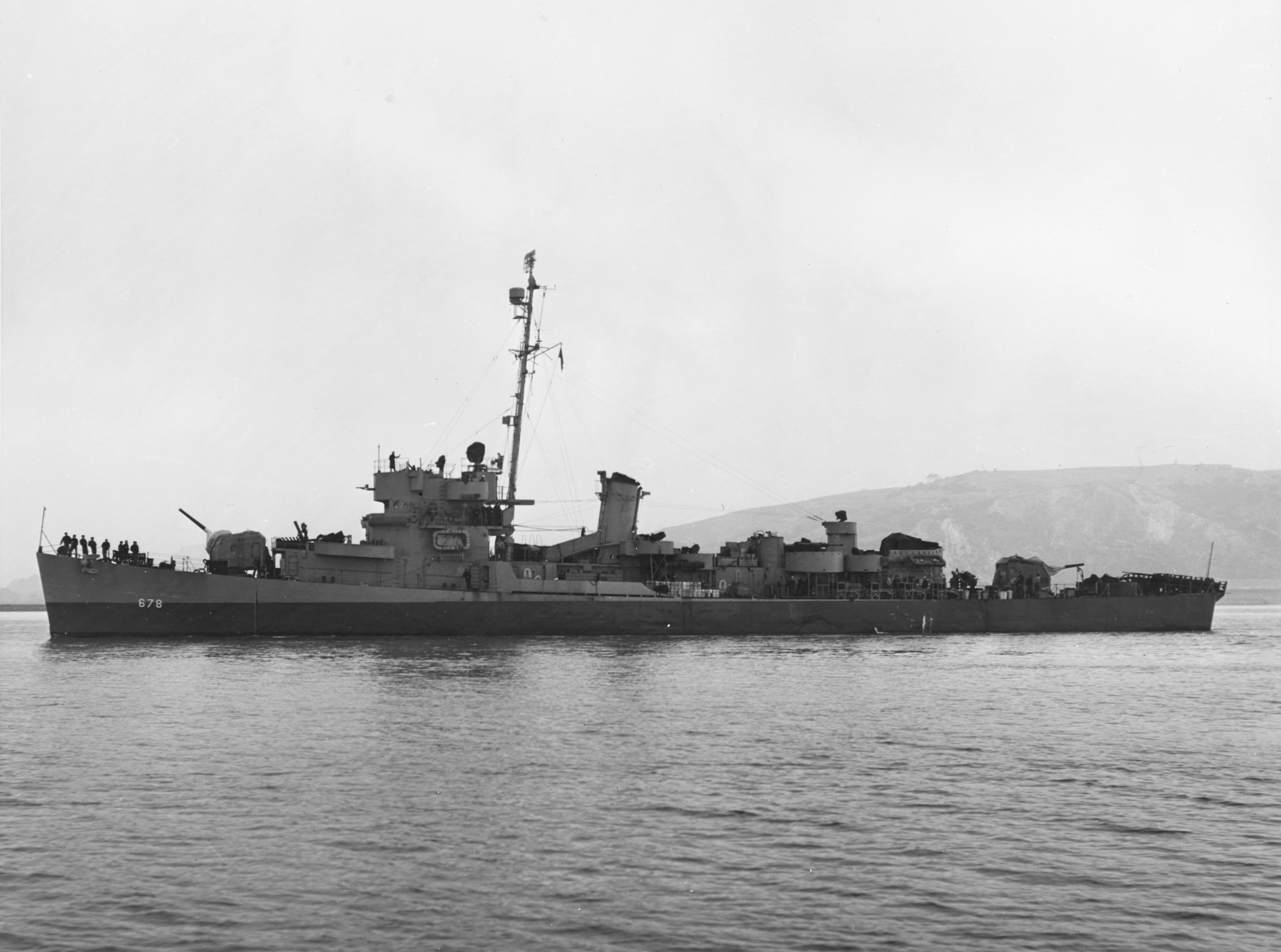
Harmon in 1945, after her 3"/50cals were replaced with 5"/38s.

Harmon received three battle stars for World War II service.

== Sources ==
- NAVAL HISTORICAL CENTER
