= The Negro Soldier =

1944 film by Stuart Heisler

- Film poster
- Directed by: Stuart Heisler
- Written by: Carlton Moss
- Produced by: Frank Capra; United States Department of War
- Starring: Carlton Moss; Norman Ford; Bertha Woolford; George Washington Carver; Benjamin O. Davis Jr. Jesse Owens
- Cinematography: CPO Alan Q. Thompson; Capt. Horace Woodard; Lt. Paul C. Vogel
- Music by: Albert Glasser; Calvin Jackson; Howard Jackson; Earl Robinson; Dimitri Tiomkin
- Distributed by: War Activities Committee of the Motion Pictures Industry
- Release date: 1944
- Running time: 43 minutes
- Country: United States
- Language: English

The Negro Soldier is a 1944 documentary film created by the United States Army during World War II. It was produced by Frank Capra as a follow-up to his successful film series Why We Fight. The army used the film as propaganda to convince black Americans to enlist in the army and fight in the war. Most people regarded the film very highly, some going as far as to say that The Negro Soldier was "one of the finest things that ever happened to America". Due to both high reviews and great cinematography, The Negro Soldier proved to be a breakout film influencing army members and civilians of all races. In 2011, it was chosen for preservation in the National Film Registry by the Library of Congress.

== History ==
During World War II, Nazi Germany threatened to take over Europe, North Africa and the Near East. The United States Army was looking for men to enlist. Although the U.S. Army was officially committed to practicing segregation, they turned to African American workforce. Social scientists of the time argued that the mass media were the best way to instill a message within people and push them to act towards a common goal.

The Army selected Frank Capra to head the effort to create morale films designed to build enthusiasm for war purposes. Capra was an immigrant from Sicily, who began his career in Hollywood working on humorous short films. However, he went on to create many well-known films that made it big in the box office. The U.S. Department of War decided to film a documentary on African-American soldiers after Under Secretary of War Robert P. Patterson learned of the conditions in the South under Jim Crow laws imposing racial segregation from his advisor Truman Gibson. In March 1942, Capra began brainstorming The Negro Soldier. He asked different researchers to inform him about what was acceptable and what was not acceptable in creating a cinematic depiction of African-Americans. These researchers came up with a list of cautions, some of which included "avoid stereotypes such as the Negroes’ alleged affinity for watermelon or pork; also avoid strong images of racial identity (‘play down colored soldiers more Negroid in appearance’ and omit ‘Lincoln, emancipation, or any race leaders or friends of the Negro’)". With these cautions in mind, the writer Marc Connelly created the first script for The Negro Soldier, with the same sympathetic treatment for Negro themes that he had used in his earlier work, The Green Pastures. Connelly's first script ended up being too dramatic for the Army's tastes. In response, Ben Hecht and Jo Swerling prepared a second draft of the movie; however, it too was rejected because the Army insisted the movie be more of a documentary. William Wyler was initially hired to direct and did research for the film in Alabama, but his involvement ended when he was transferred to the U.S. Army Air Force. Ultimately, Carlton Moss was hired to write the movie and Stuart Heisler became director. Moss attended Columbia University and worked for the Federal Theater Project. Both Moss and Heisler worked very well together.

The film began shooting in 1943. The movie crew traveled the United States, visiting over 19 army posts. The final movie was 43 minutes long and received official support in 1944. At first, The Negro Soldier was intended for only African-American troops; however, the creators of the film decided that they wanted to distribute the film to a wider military and civil audience. Nobody was certain what the impact of the film would have on viewers, and many people feared that African-Americans would have a negative response to the film. However, when the first African-American troops saw the film, they insisted that all African-American troops should see it. Furthermore, after both African-Americans and whites were surveyed about their response to the film, the filmmakers were shocked when over 80% of the white population thought the film should be shown to both black and white troops, as well as white civilians.

Eventually, replacement centers all over the United States required their troops to watch The Negro Soldier. Almost all black soldiers and airmen saw the film, and many white soldiers watched the film during orientation programs. Although the film had been made solely for a military audience, Capra and the rest of the film crew wanted to distribute the film commercially all over the United States as well.

Film critic and author James Agee commented incisively on it in 1944:

The Army Orientation film The Negro Soldier is straight and decent as far as it goes, and means a good deal, I gather, to most of the Negro soldiers who have seen it. It is also pitifully, painfully mild; but neither the film nor those who actually made it should be criticized for that. The mildness is, rather, a cruel measure of the utmost that the War Department dares or is willing to have said on the subject. The same mildness makes the film amenable to very broad public distribution, without wholly obviating its almost certain good effect upon a massive white audience which needs to be reached and influenced, however tamely. Whether tougher treatments ever get to the screen depends, in part, on how many people see this one. And that may largely depend on the efforts of the Negroes and whites whom this particular film is surest to disappoint. For I suspect that most exhibitors are going to need encouragement from the audience, in one form or another, to ask for the film at all—to say nothing of advertising it. And I believe that to many people the screen presentation of the Negro as something other than a clown, a burnt-cork Job, or a plain imbecile, will be more startling and more instructive than we are likely to imagine.

Many people gave the film great reviews and praised the film very highly; however, the film did not do well commercially as shown in theatres. The 43-minute length of the film made it awkward to show alongside typical films of the time that were longer than one hour. All the while, a filmmaker named Jack Goldberg was suing Capra and The Negro Soldier because he believed that the film "competed unfairly" with his own film, We've Come a Long, Long Way (1944) that dealt with the same race issues. Although Goldberg ended up losing this lawsuit, The Negro Soldier was never successful in theaters.

== Summary ==
The Negro Soldier

The Negro Soldier opens in a large, neo-gothic style church. From the point of view of the congregation, we see a preacher giving a sermon referring to different men in the army. The camera pans to different members of the army seated in the audience as the preacher mentions each one. This preacher, played by Carlton Moss, then launches into a speech reflecting on the achievements of African-Americans over the years. Famous boxers and track stars are mentioned as defeating Germany in matches such as the Berlin Olympic Games. The preacher mentions that the Nazi army is currently at war with the entire world, and just like "Joe Louis training for the fight of his life", the real championship will be determining which way of life will survive World War II. Moss claims that the stakes in this war are the greatest that men have ever fought for. To further stress the importance of fighting against the Nazis, Moss begins to read from the "gospel according to Hitler". At this time Moss quotes from Hitler's book Mein Kampf, "...it is a sin against all reason to train a born half-ape until one believes one has made a lawyer of him." This quote is used to plant anger and the desire to want to fight against Hitler and his army. The congregation looks surprised to realize what the Nazis really think about the African-American race.

Moss then begins to recall all of the examples of African-American heroism over the history of America. For example, Moss mentions Crispus Attucks being the first to die in the Boston Massacre. These scenes from different battles and different time periods over United States history are proof that America truly owes its national freedom to all of its peoples, including the African-American population. Moss goes on to mention that a statue had been built in order to commemorate all colored soldiers with the engraving, "lasting record shall be made of their unselfish devotion to duty". Unfortunately, Moss claims, the Nazis went on to destroy the monuments in France that were devoted to African-American soldiers from World War I. Furthermore, in reference to America, Moss says "men of every faith, color, and town have helped to nourish it". Moss keeps stressing the fact that African-Americans played a crucial role in building the United States and making the country what it is today.

The film then shifts gears, as a woman from the congregation, a Mrs. Bronson, stands up to talk about her son, who has recently joined the army. She reads a letter from him, where he tells how he has learned how to make a bed, played sports, met a girl at a dance, and trained on the battlefield. The film shows images of Mrs. Bronson's son going through training and all of the different events that he writes about in his letter. The head officials in the army are shown telling all of the soldiers that there are now three times as many colored men in the army than there were previously. This section of the film stresses the notion that men of all colors and backgrounds have come together to fight on the battlefield for the common purpose of defeating the Nazis. All men, colored or white, know the meaning of their job and are determined to work together in order to fight against evil. The common man who has previously been known as a farmer, carpenter, tailor, or any other common folk job is now a part of the United States Army and ready to do his share in the fight. The Negro Soldier flashes different scenes of the brutal warfare taking place that need to be dealt with. The final scene of the movie shows the entire black congregation standing up and singing, as soldiers march towards the fight.

== Influence ==
The Negro Soldier influenced later African-American films and its viewers in different ways. The film played a considerable part in altering the types of roles that African-Americans received in following films. For example, instead of showing blacks only as slaves or subservients, this film showed African-Americans as lawyers, musicians, athletes, and other valued professions. In different movies during this time period, African-Americans were often portrayed as humorous characters. However, after The Negro Soldier, African-Americans played more respectable and prominent roles in films.

Furthermore, people came to realize how important and influential a tool films were for social change. Messages within films, if expressed the correct way, could influence audiences greatly. The message within The Negro Soldier solidified the notion and provided visual proof that racial equality was a justified concept and should be accepted. Many African-American viewers and organizations responded enthusiastically to the film.

However, more recent analysis of the film takes a more critical look, stating that while this film and The Negro Sailor "acknowledged African Americans' contributions to America's military history, by overlooking the persistence of racial segregation in the armed forced, they implied that the black struggle for civil rights was complete."

== Legacy ==
In December 2011, The Negro Soldier was deemed "culturally, historically, or aesthetically significant" by the United States Library of Congress and selected for preservation in the National Film Registry. The Registry said the film "showcased the contributions of blacks to American society and their heroism in the nation's wars, portraying them in a dignified, realistic, and far less stereotypical manner than they had been depicted in previous Hollywood films."

== See also ==
- List of Allied propaganda films of World War II
- The Negro Sailor
