= Morgan State University Memorial Chapel =

- U.S. National Register of Historic Places
- Location within Baltimore Location within Maryland Location within the United States
- Location: 4307 Hillen Rd; Baltimore, Maryland
- Coordinates: 39°20′34.6″N 76°35′09.5″W
- Area: less than one acre
- Built: 1941
- Architect: Albert Irvin Cassell
- NRHP reference No.: 100002500
- Added to NRHP: May 21, 2018

The Morgan State University Memorial Chapel, also known as the Student Center for Morgan State College, Morgan Christian Center, Morgan Interfaith Center, and Susie Carr Love Chapel, is a historic building located on the campus of Morgan State University in Baltimore, Maryland, United States. It is significant for its association with the nationally recognized African American architect who designed it, Albert Irvin Cassell. He is noteworthy for his designs for buildings at several Historically Black Colleges and Universities, including other projects at Morgan State. This was the first student center built on campus, and in addition to worship services, the building housed other social activities.

The single-story masonry structure was completed in 1941 in a modern interpretation of the Collegiate Gothic style. It was listed on the National Register of Historic Places in 2018.
