= Albert Cassell =

American architect (1895–1969)

Albert Irvin Cassell
- Born: June 25, 1895; Towson, Maryland, U.S.
- Died: November 30, 1969; Washington, D.C., U.S.
- Education: Cornell University
- Occupation: Architect
- Practice: Howard University

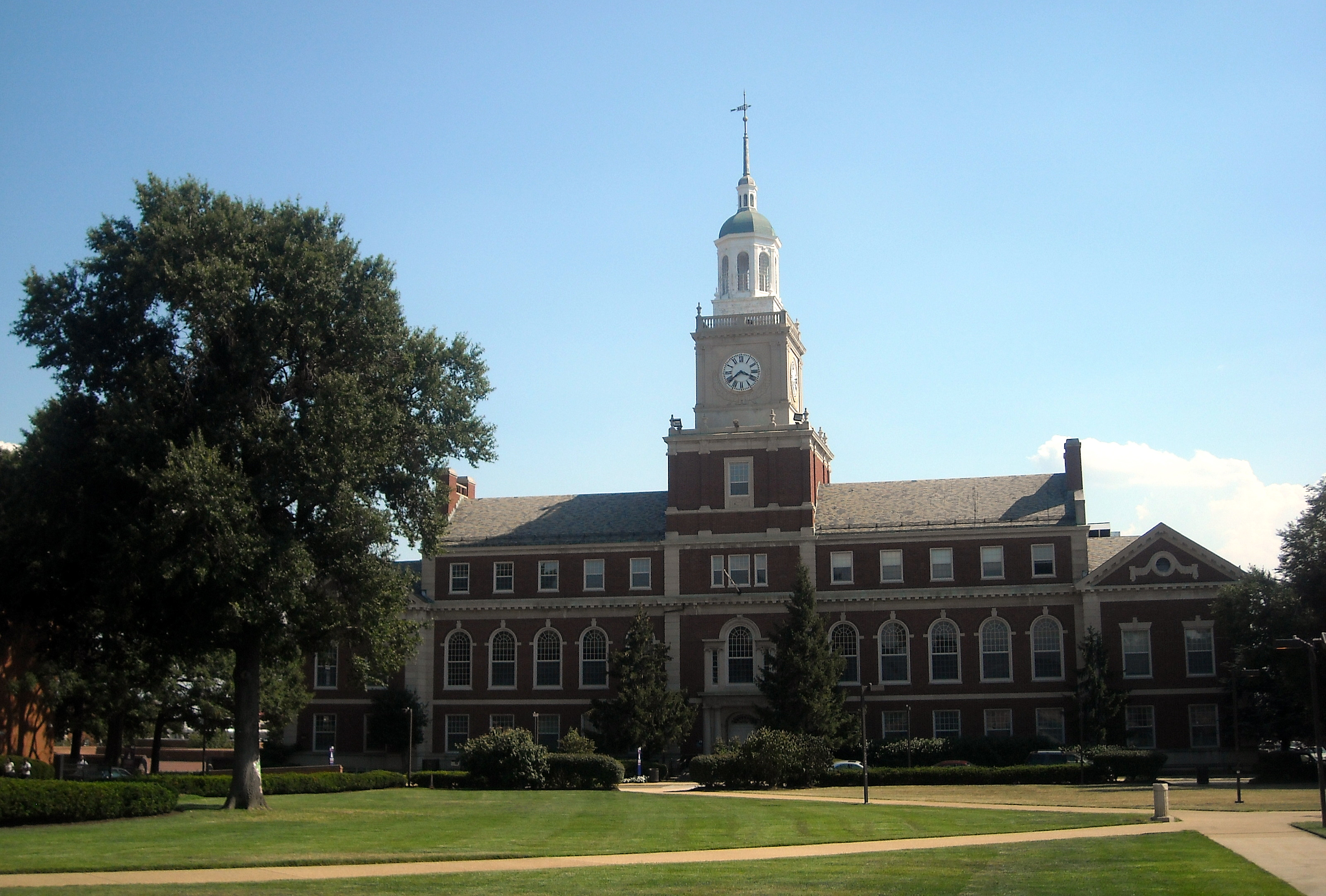
Founders Library (1937) at Howard University in Washington, D.C.

Albert Irvin Cassell (1895–1969) was a prominent mid-20th-century African-American architect in Washington, D.C., whose work shaped many academic communities in the United States. He designed buildings for Howard University in Washington D.C., Morgan State University in Baltimore, and Virginia Union University in Richmond. Cassell also designed and built civic structures for the State of Maryland and the District of Columbia.

== Early life ==
Albert Irvin Cassell was born in Towson, Maryland, on June 25, 1895, the third child of Albert Truman Cassell and Charlotte Cassell. His father Albert T. Cassell was a coal truck driver and his mother Charlotte Cassell aka "Lottie" was a laundress. Albert Cassell began his education in the segregated Baltimore public school system, but moved to New York in 1909 where he began attending Douglas High School. At Douglas High, Cassell studied drafting under Ralph Victor Cook. With Cook's assistance, Cassell was admitted to the Cornell University architecture program in 1915, where he was a member of Alpha Phi Alpha.

After completing two years at Cornell, Cassell's studies were interrupted by service in the US Army in World War I. He served in France, but not in combat, and was honorably discharged in 1919 as a second lieutenant in the 351st Heavy Field Artillery Regiment. In 1919, Cassell was awarded his degree from Cornell University, and began his career working with architect William A. Hazel. In 1920, Mr. Cassell joined in the Architecture Department of Howard University as assistant professor. Just two years later, in 1922, Cassell had become University Architect and head of the Architecture Department at Howard.

== Career ==
Cassell worked at Howard University for eighteen years, serving as an instructor, land manager, surveyor, and architect. Cassell's vision and work helped shape the campus through his "Twenty Year Plan", through which he designed numerous campus buildings. His most important design at Howard, was the Founders Library, a building which evoked both the Georgian architecture revival style and Independence Hall in Philadelphia. This building would become an architectural and educational symbol for the university.

While at Howard, Cassell also designed buildings for other institutional clients. His work included buildings at Virginia Union University, Provident Hospital in Baltimore, various Masonic temples, as well as smaller works for select commercial and residential clients.

Following his time at Howard University, Cassell went on to design several buildings for Morgan State College (now Morgan State University) in Baltimore. In his later years he joined with other African-American architects to form the firm of Cassell, Gray & Sutton. He went on to work for several other large clients such as the Roman Catholic Archdiocese of Washington and the government of the District of Columbia.

As his final project, Cassell sought to develop Chesapeake Heights on the Bay, a 520-acre (2.1 km^{2}) summer resort community for African-Americans in Prince Frederick, Maryland. The project was to feature houses, a motel, shopping centers, a pier, a marina, beaches, and a clubhouse fronting the Chesapeake Bay. Roads and a few homes were built by 1969, but the project ended with Cassell's death in that same year.

== Legacy ==
At a young age, Albert Cassell determined that his children would all go to Cornell and all become architects. Cassell had 8 children. Four children would attended Cornell; Charles Cassell ('46), Martha Cassell ('47) Alberta Jeannette Cassell ('48) Paula Cassell ('76). Of the Cornell graduates, all but Paula became architects.

== Works ==
- Campbell Ave Church, Washington, DC, 1917
- Carver War Public Housing, Arlington, VA, 1942
- Catholic Diocese, Washington, DC
- Corinthian Baptist Church, Washington, DC
- Crownsville Hospital Housing & Recreation Center, Crownsville, MD, 1950
- Glenarden City Hall, Glenarden, Maryland
- Howard University Armory, Washington, DC, 1925
- Howard University Baldwin Hall, Washington, DC, 1951
- Howard University Chemistry Building, Washington, DC, 1936
- Howard University College of Medicine, Washington, DC, 1927
- Howard University Crandall Women's Dormitory, Washington, DC, 1931
- Howard University Dining Hall, Washington, DC, 1922
- Howard University Douglas Men's Dormitory, Washington, DC, 1936
- Howard University Founders Library, Washington, DC, 1937
- Howard University Frazier Women's Dormitory, Washington, DC
- Howard University Greene Stadium and Football Field, Washington, DC, 1926
- Howard University President's Home, Washington, DC
- Howard University Truth Women's Dormitory, Washington, DC
- Howard University Wheatley Hall, Washington, DC
- Howard University Women's Gym, Washington, DC
- James Creek Public Housing, Washington, DC
- Mayfair Garden, Washington, DC
- Mayfair Mansions Apartments, (built 1938), 3819 Jay St., NE., Washington, DC, NRHP-listed
- Morgan State College (various buildings), Baltimore, MD
  - Morgan State University Memorial Chapel (1941)
- Odd Fellows Temple, Washington, DC and Baltimore, MD, 1932
- Prince Hall Masonic Temple, 1000 U St., NW, Washington, DC, NRHP-listed
- Provident Hospital, Baltimore, MD, 1928
- Seaton Elementary School, Washington, DC
- Soller's Point War Housing, Dundalk, MD
- St. Paul's Baptist Church, Baltimore, MD
- Tuskegee Institute Trade Buildings, Tuskegee, AL
- Virginia Union Hartshorn Dormitory, Richmond, VA, 1928
- Wheatley YMCA, Washington, DC

Two of Cassell's Washington, DC works, the Mayfair Mansions Apartments and the Prince Hall Masonic Temple, are listed on the U.S. National Register of Historic Places.

== Gallery ==
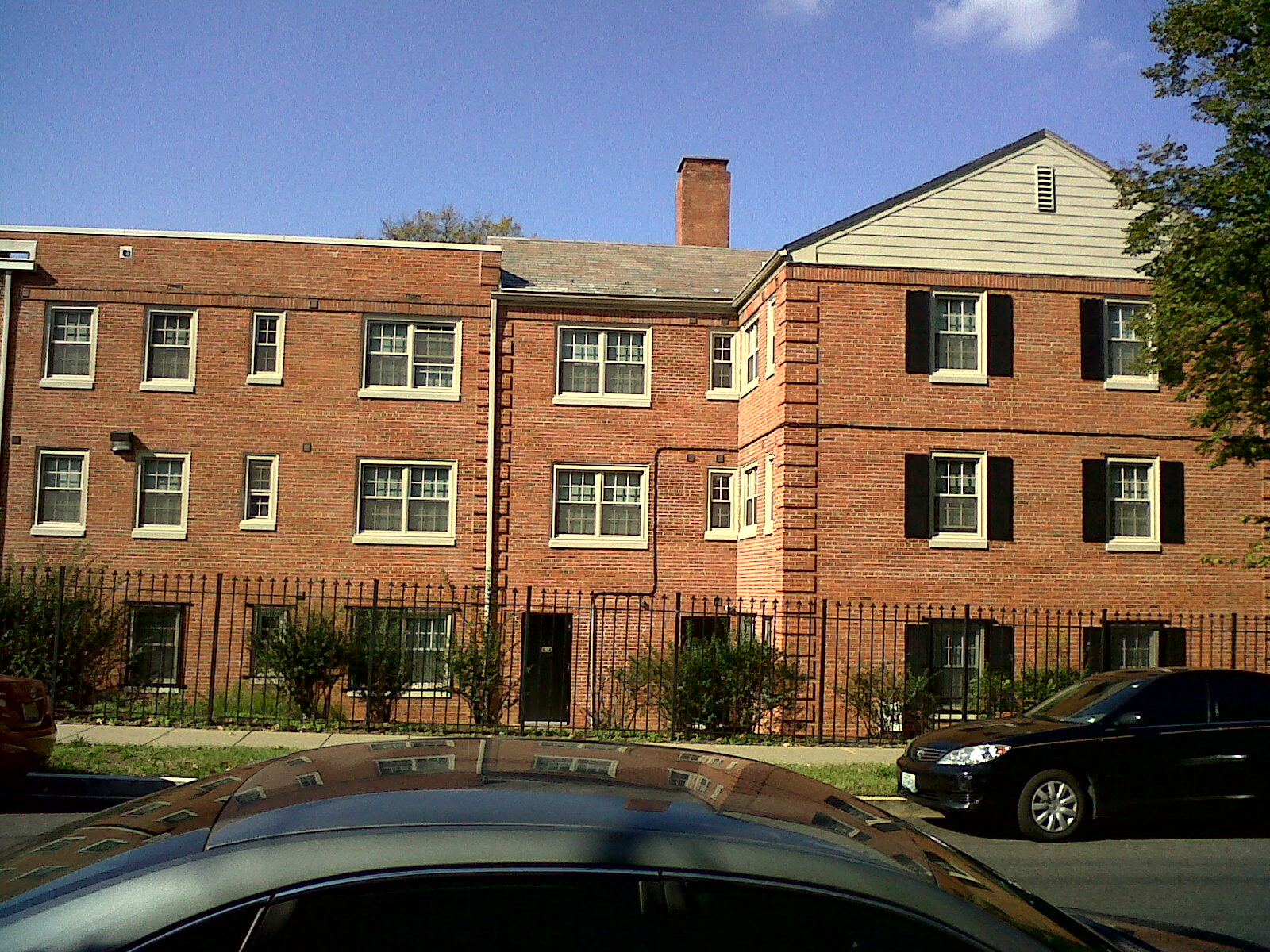
Mayfair Mansions-an apartment complex located at 3819 Jay St., NE, Washington, DC

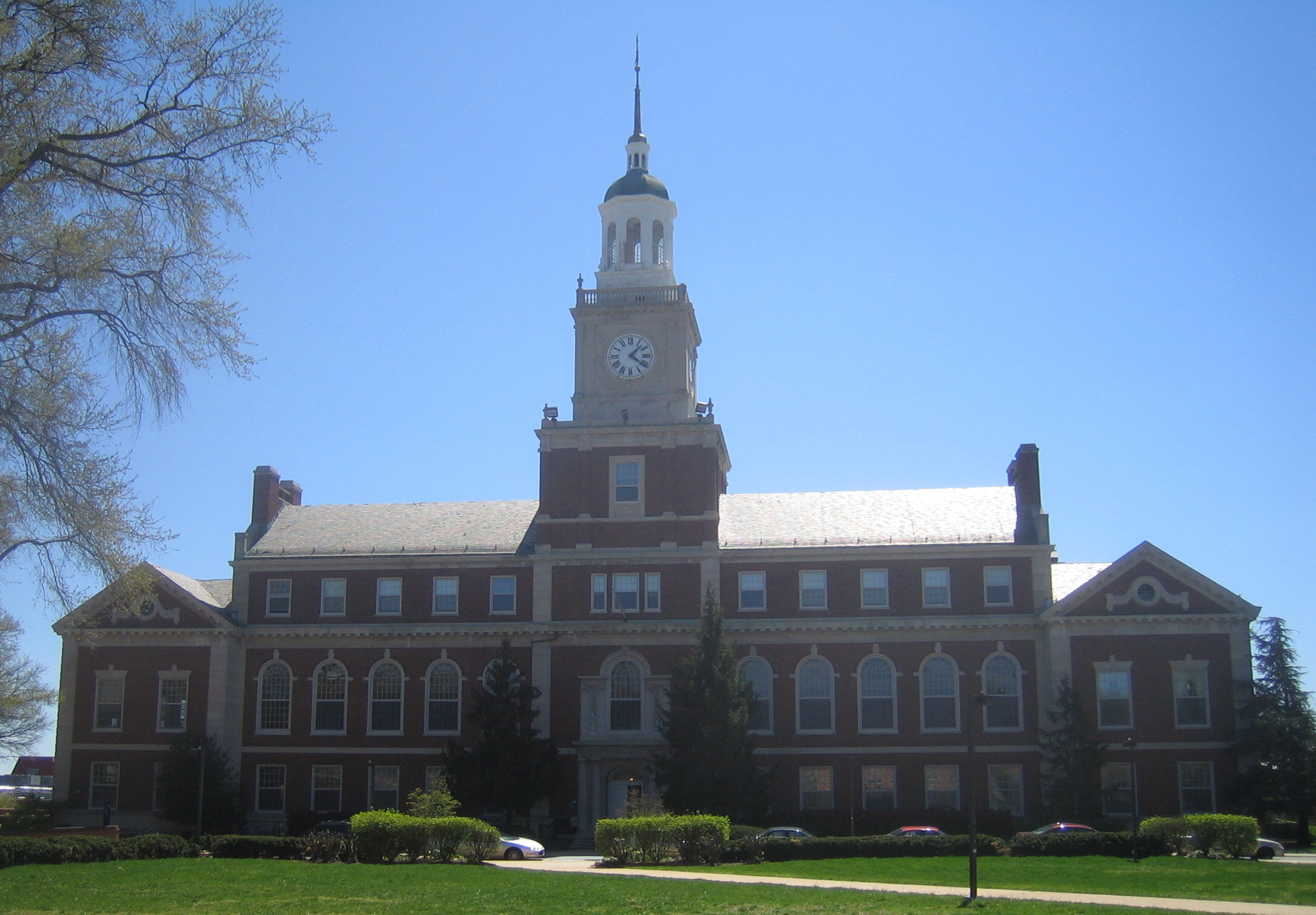
The Founders Library — at Howard University, Washington, D.C.

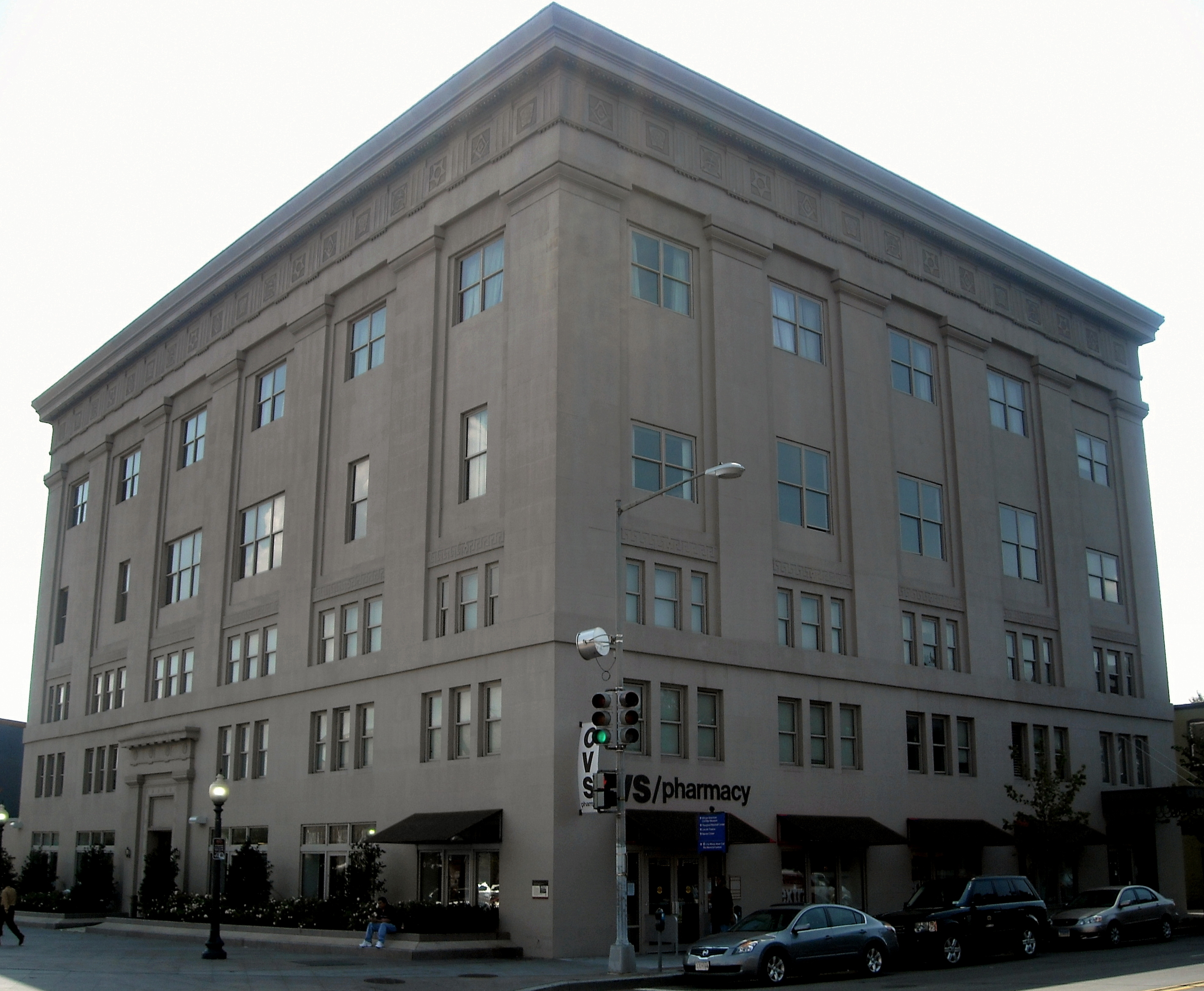
The Prince Hall Masonic Temple located at 1000 U Street, NW in the U Street Corridor of Washington, D.C.
