= Leonard Roy Harmon =

United States Navy sailor

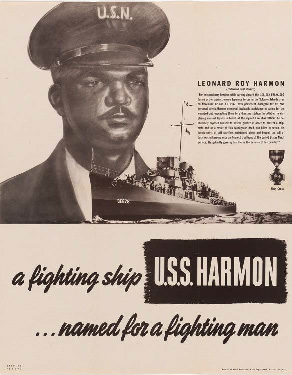
- A 1943 poster in honor of Harmon.
- Born: January 21, 1917; Cuero, Texas, United States
- Died: November 23, 1942 (aged 25); Guadalcanal, Solomon Islands
- Military career
- Allegiance: United States
- Branch: United States Navy
- Service years: 1939–1942
- Rank: Messman First Class
- Unit: USS San Francisco
- Conflicts: World War II: Naval Battle of Guadalcanal
- Awards: Navy Cross; Purple Heart

Leonard Roy Harmon (January 21, 1917 – November 13, 1942) was an American sailor who died in action during World War II and was posthumously awarded the Navy Cross for his valor. He is the first African-American man to have a US warship, the USS Harmon (DE-678), named after him.

== Life ==
Harmon was born in Cuero, Texas, on January 21, 1917. He attended the segregated all-black Daule High School before working in livestock production. During the Great Depression, he performed various house and grounds chores for the owner of the historic William Frobese home in Cuero. He was 22 years of age when he enlisted in the United States Navy in June 1939 at a San Antonio recruiting station. He reported for training in Norfolk, Virginia, before reporting for duty on the cruiser USS San Francisco on October 28, 1939. He trained as a Mess Attendant, one of the few jobs available to black men in the navy at that time. The basic job description consisted of serving food to officers and crew aboard ship. However, like all members of a ship's crew they were also trained in damage control and had stations to report to during general quarters.

During his service, Harmon became a Mess Attendant First Class and was serving aboard the San Francisco during the Naval Battle of Guadalcanal. On November 13, 1942, San Francisco was raked by Japanese gunfire during the battle, killing nearly every officer on the bridge. Harmon rushed in to evacuate the wounded. He was then assigned to assist Pharmacist's Mate Lyndford Bondsteel in evacuating and caring for the wounded. While the ship was being raked by enemy gunfire, Harmon helped evacuate the wounded to a dressing station. While doing so he deliberately stood between Bondsteel and enemy gunfire in order to protect his wounded shipmate. This action resulted in his death.

== Honors ==
Harmon was awarded the Navy Cross posthumously in March 1943. Additionally, two ships were named in his honor. HMS Aylmer (K463) had been provisionally named USS Harmon (DE-72) but was transferred to the Royal Navy prior to completion. The USS Harmon (DE-678) served from 1943 to 1947 and remained in the Reserve Fleet until 1967; it was the first US warship to be named after an African American. Harmon's heroism was also commemorated by the naming and dedication of Harmon Hall, bachelor enlisted quarters at Naval Air Station North Island, on July 29, 1975, and with a state historical marker placed at the Cuero Municipal Park in 1977. A poster of him hangs in the National Portrait Gallery in Washington, DC.

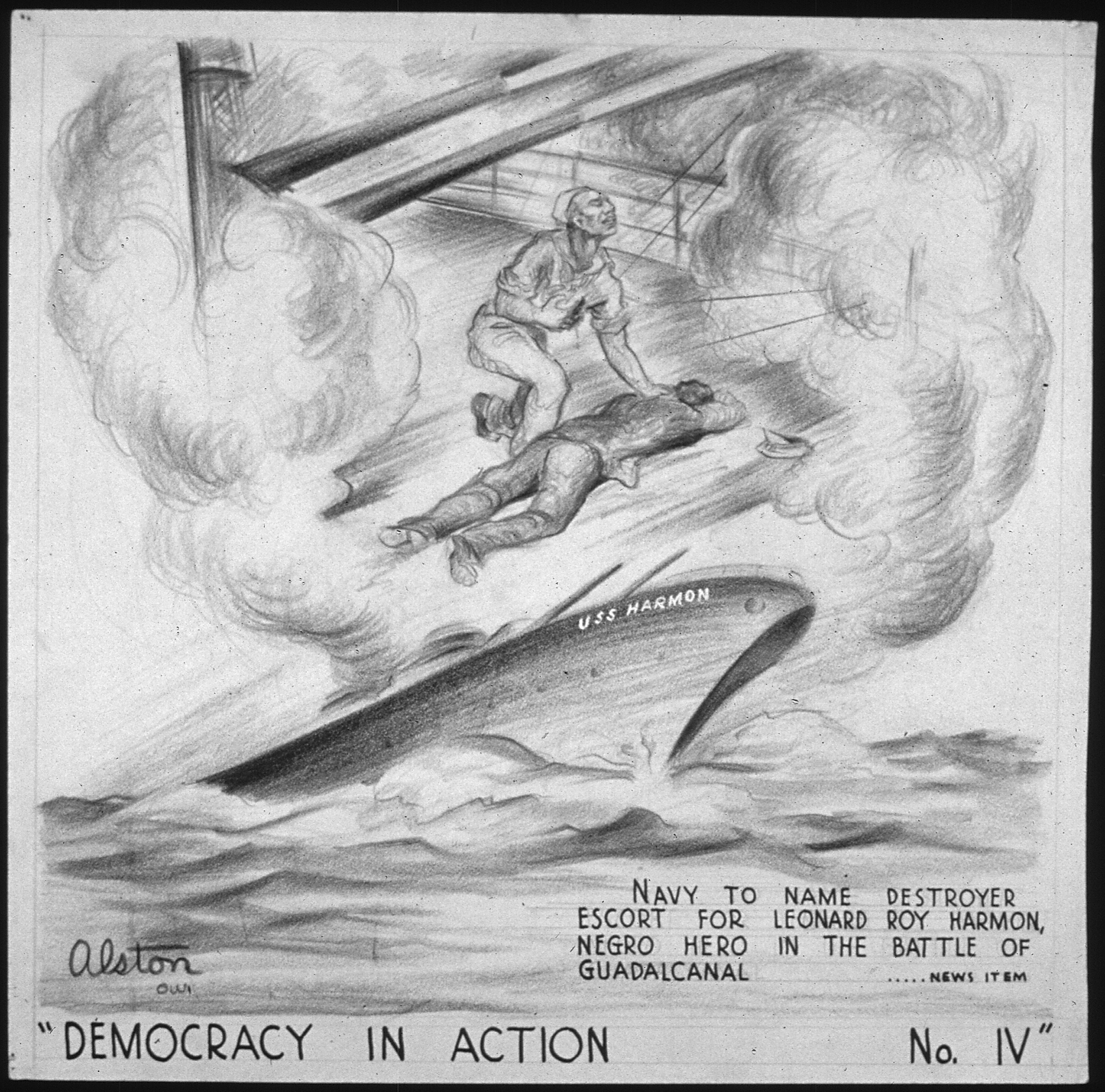
An Office of War Information poster from 1943 by Charles Alston depicting Harmon and the ship named in his honor.

=== Navy Cross citation ===
The President of the United States of America takes pride in presenting the Navy Cross (Posthumously) to Mess Attendant First Class Leonard Roy Harmon, United States Navy, for extraordinary heroism and devotion to duty in action against the enemy while serving on board the Heavy Cruiser U.S.S. SAN FRANCISCO (CA-38), during action against enemy Japanese naval forces near Savo Island in the Solomon Islands on the night of on 12–13 November 1942. With persistent disregard of his own personal safety, Mess Attendant First Class Harmon rendered invaluable assistance in caring for the wounded and assisting them to a dressing station. In addition to displaying unusual loyalty in behalf of the injured Executive Officer, he deliberately exposed himself to hostile gunfire in order to protect a shipmate and, as a result of this courageous deed, was killed in action. His heroic spirit of self-sacrifice, maintained above and beyond the call of duty, was in keeping with the highest traditions of the United States Naval Service. He gallantly gave his life for his country.
