= Allen & Collens =

American architectural firm

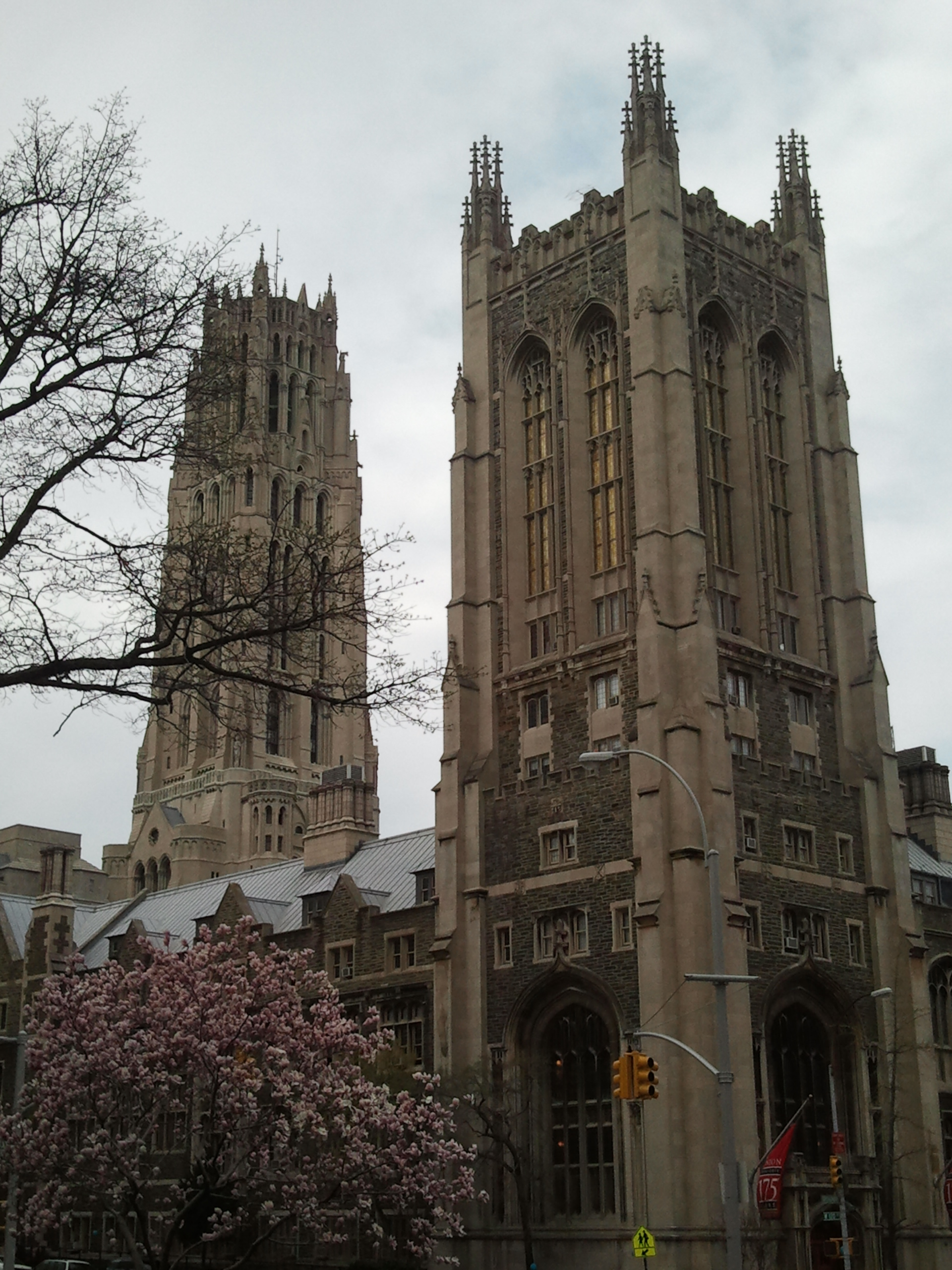
- The towers of Riverside Church (1930, left) and the Union Theological Seminary (1910, right) in New York City, two of Allen & Collens's most recognizable works

Practice information
- Founders: Francis R. Allen
- Founded: 1879
- Dissolved: 1962
- Location: Boston

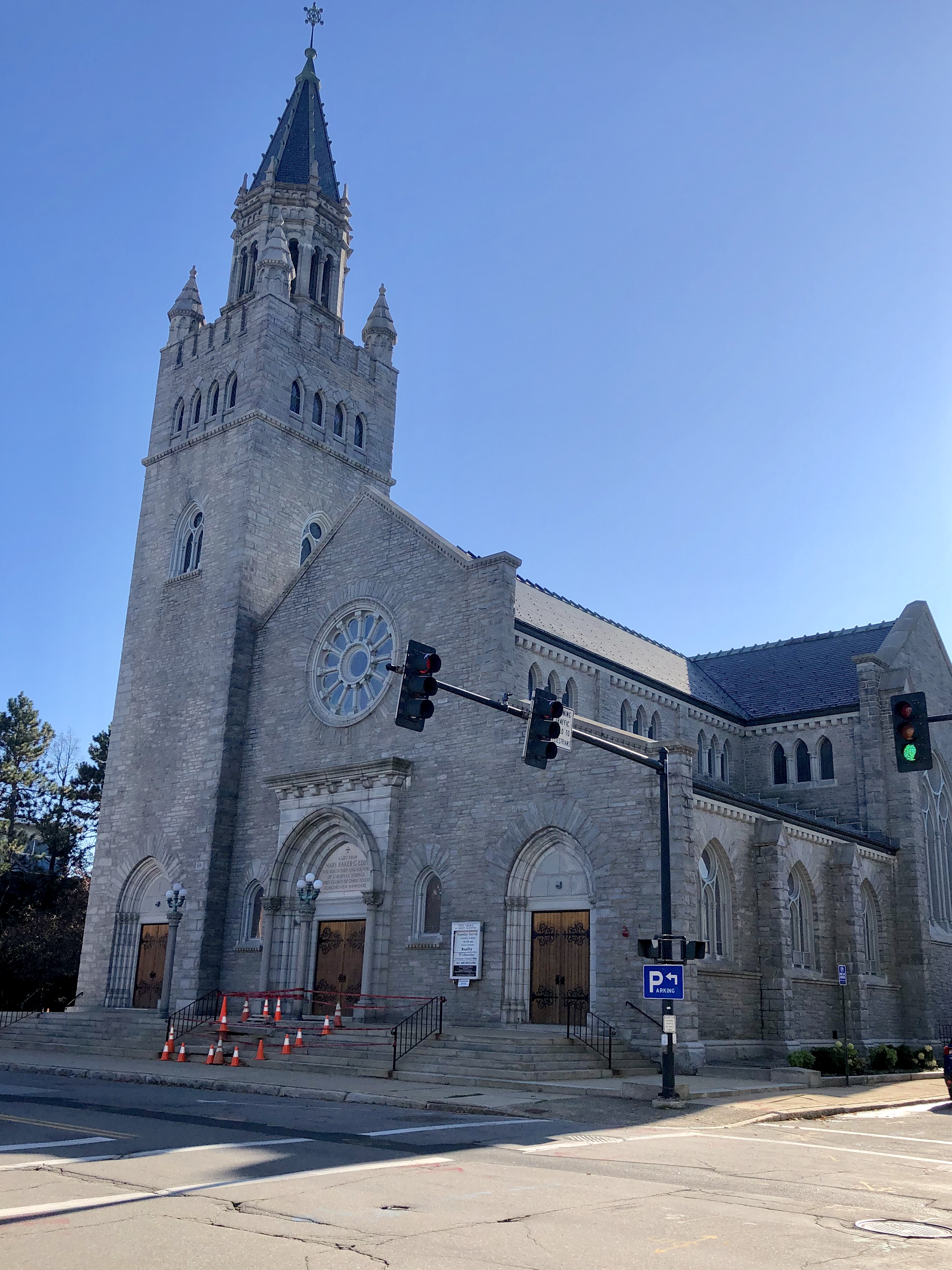
The First Church of Christ, Scientist, in Concord, New Hampshire, designed by Allen & Collens in the Gothic Revival style and completed in 1904

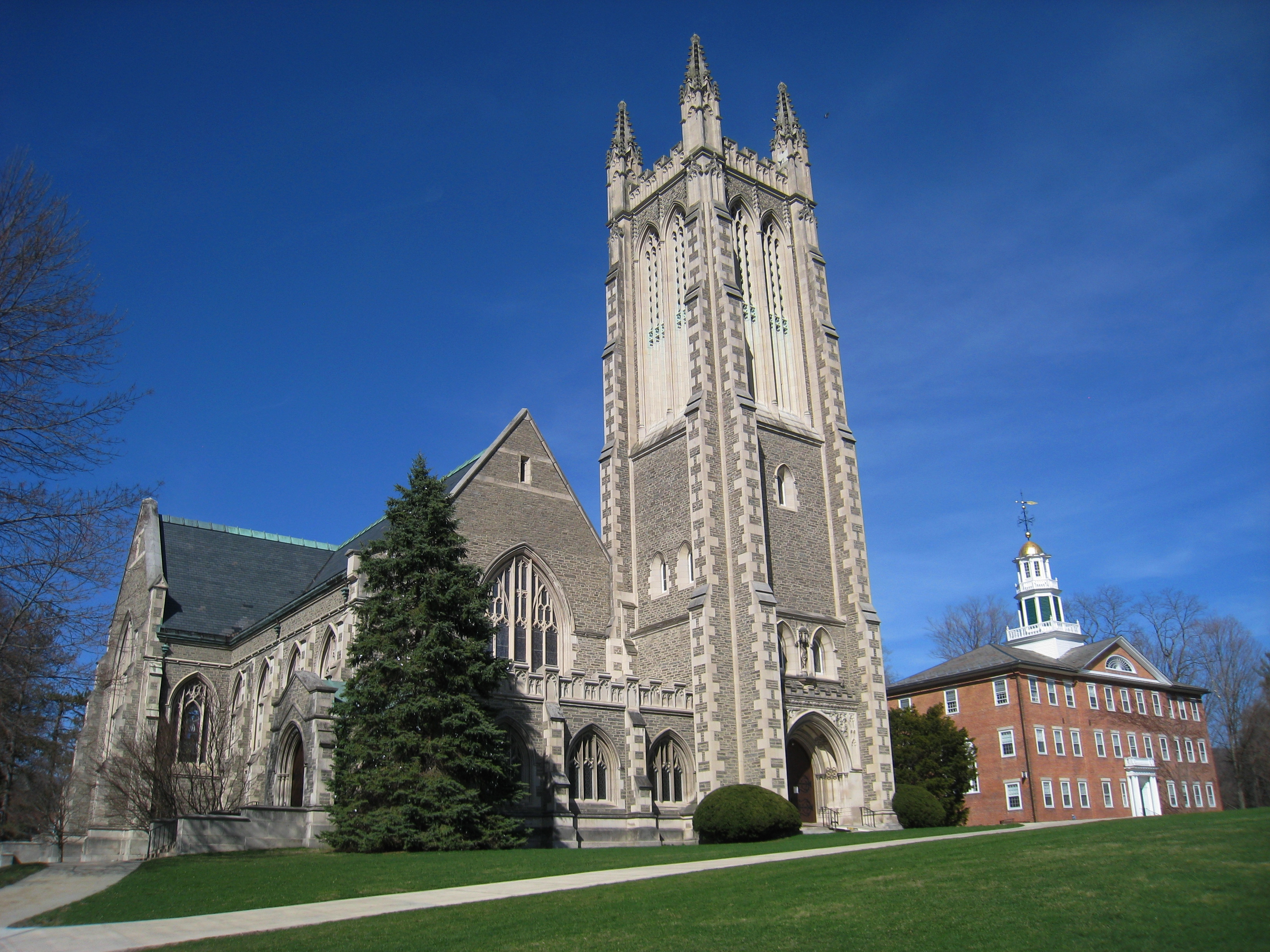
The Thompson Memorial Chapel of Williams College, designed by Allen & Collens in the Gothic Revival style and completed in 1905

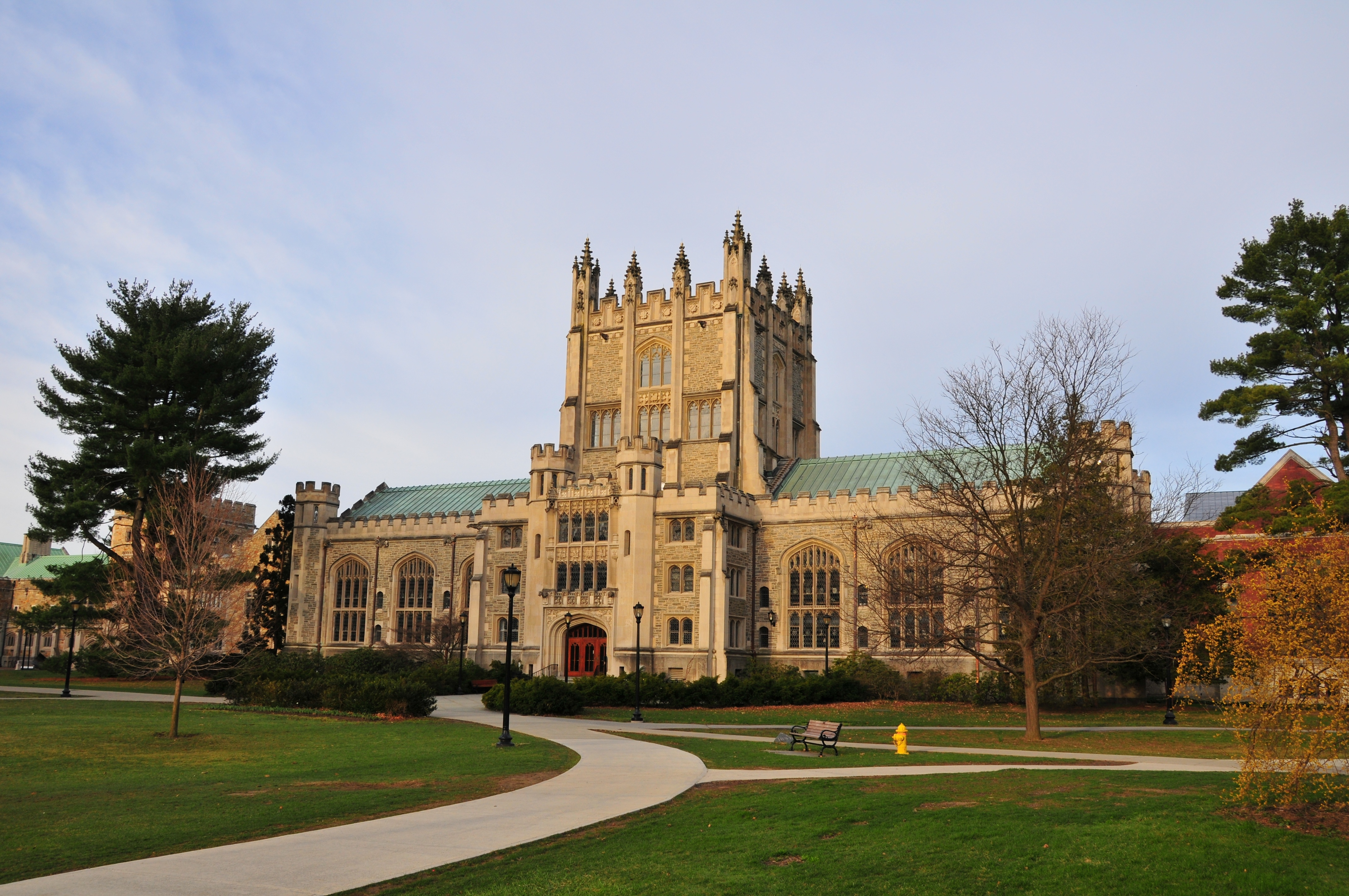
The Thompson Memorial Library of Vassar College, designed by Allen & Collens in the Collegiate Gothic style and completed in 1905

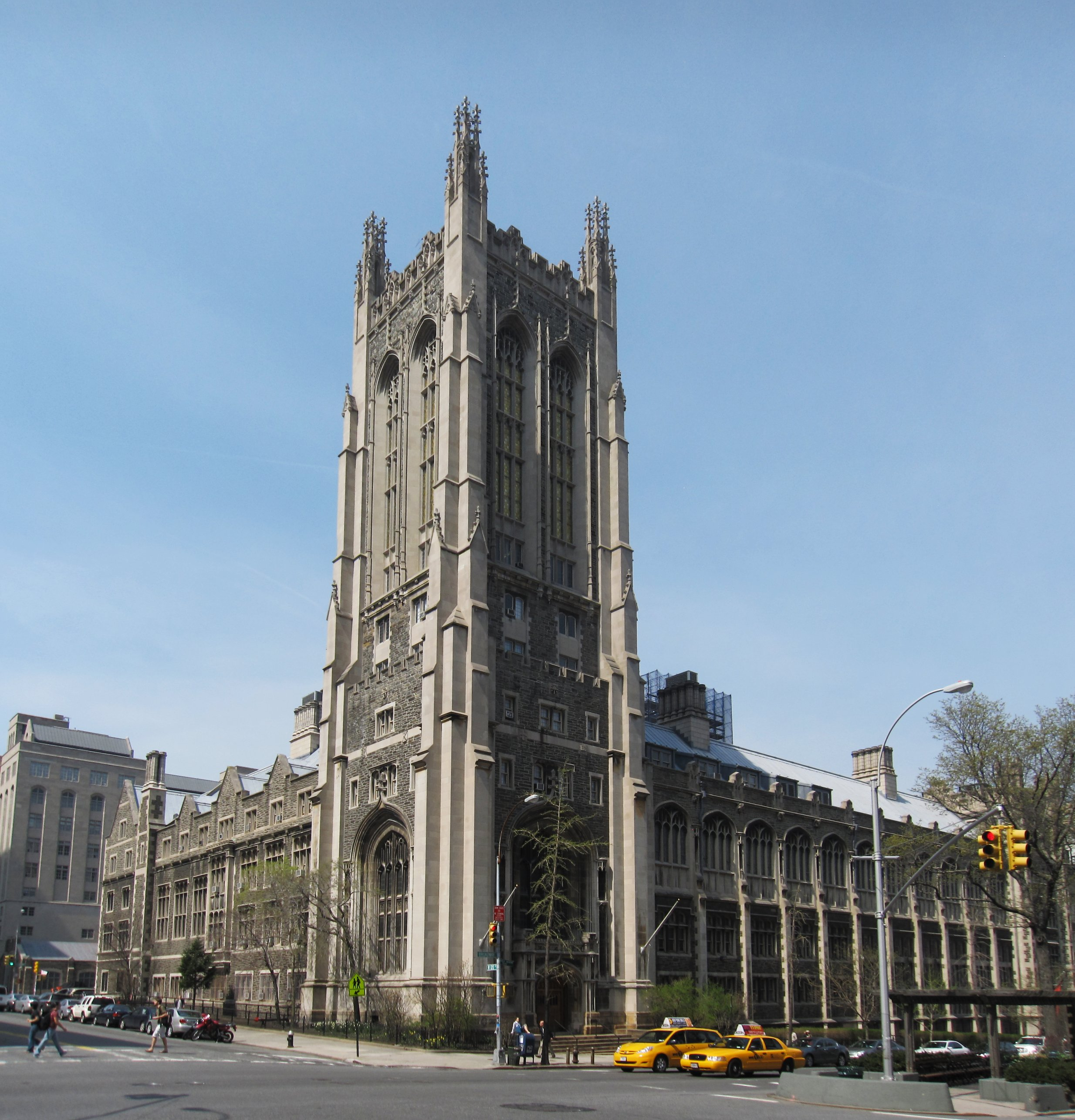
The campus of the Union Theological Seminary in New York City, designed by Allen & Collens in the Gothic Revival style and completed in 1910

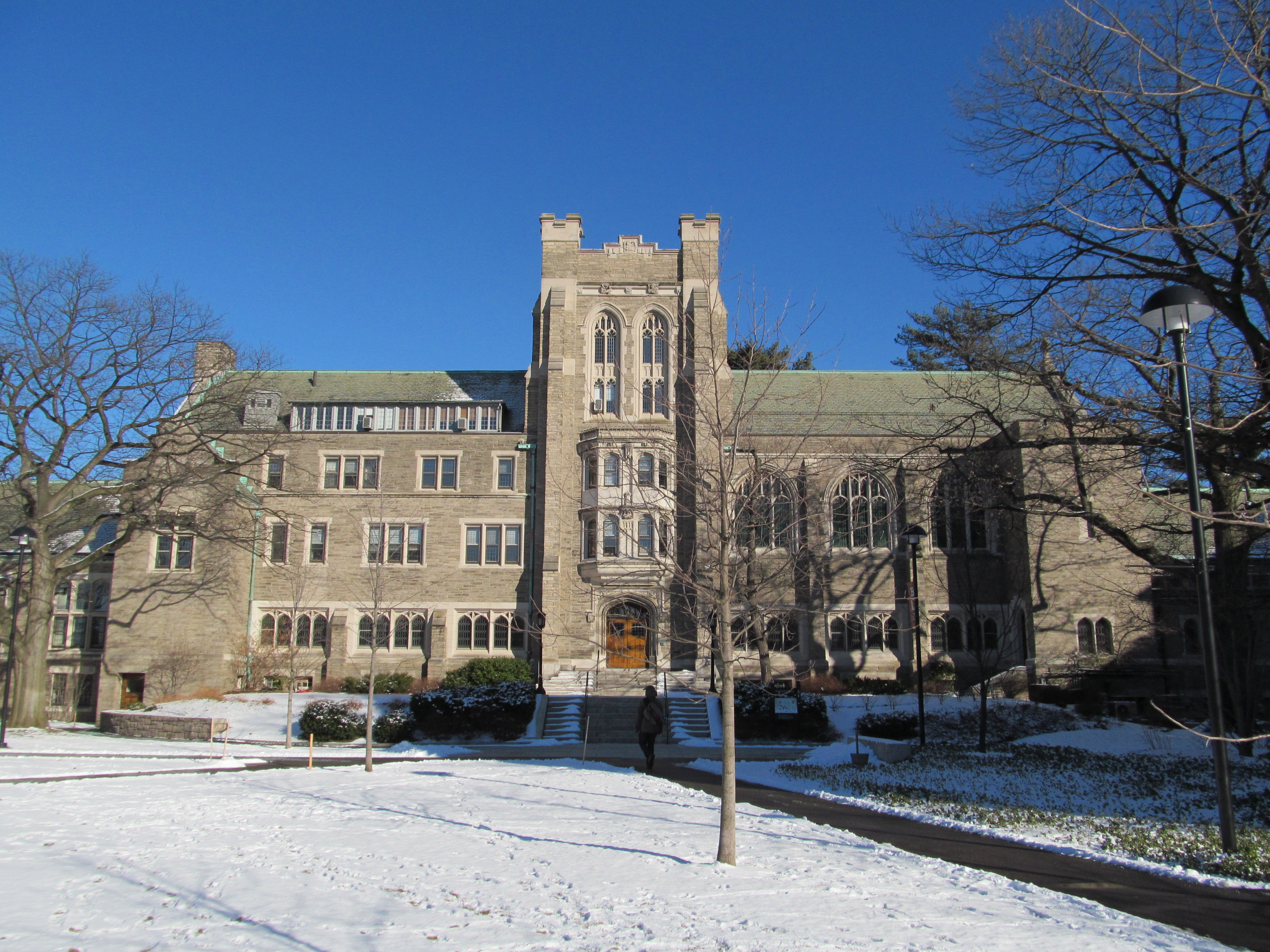
Swartz Hall of the Harvard Divinity School, designed by Allen & Collens in the Collegiate Gothic style and completed in 1911

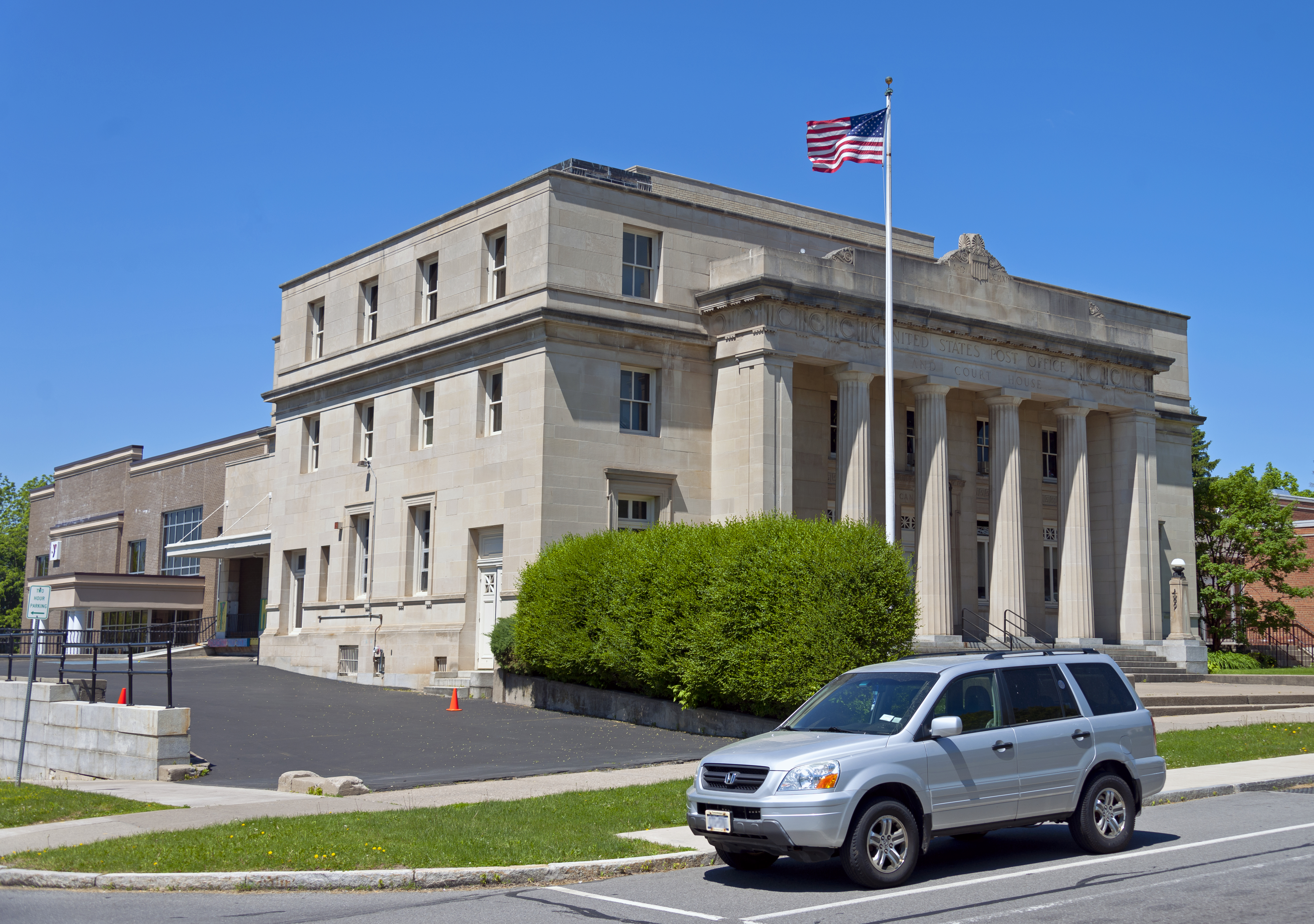
The former United States Post Office in Canandaigua, New York, designed by Allen & Collens in the Neoclassical style and completed in 1911

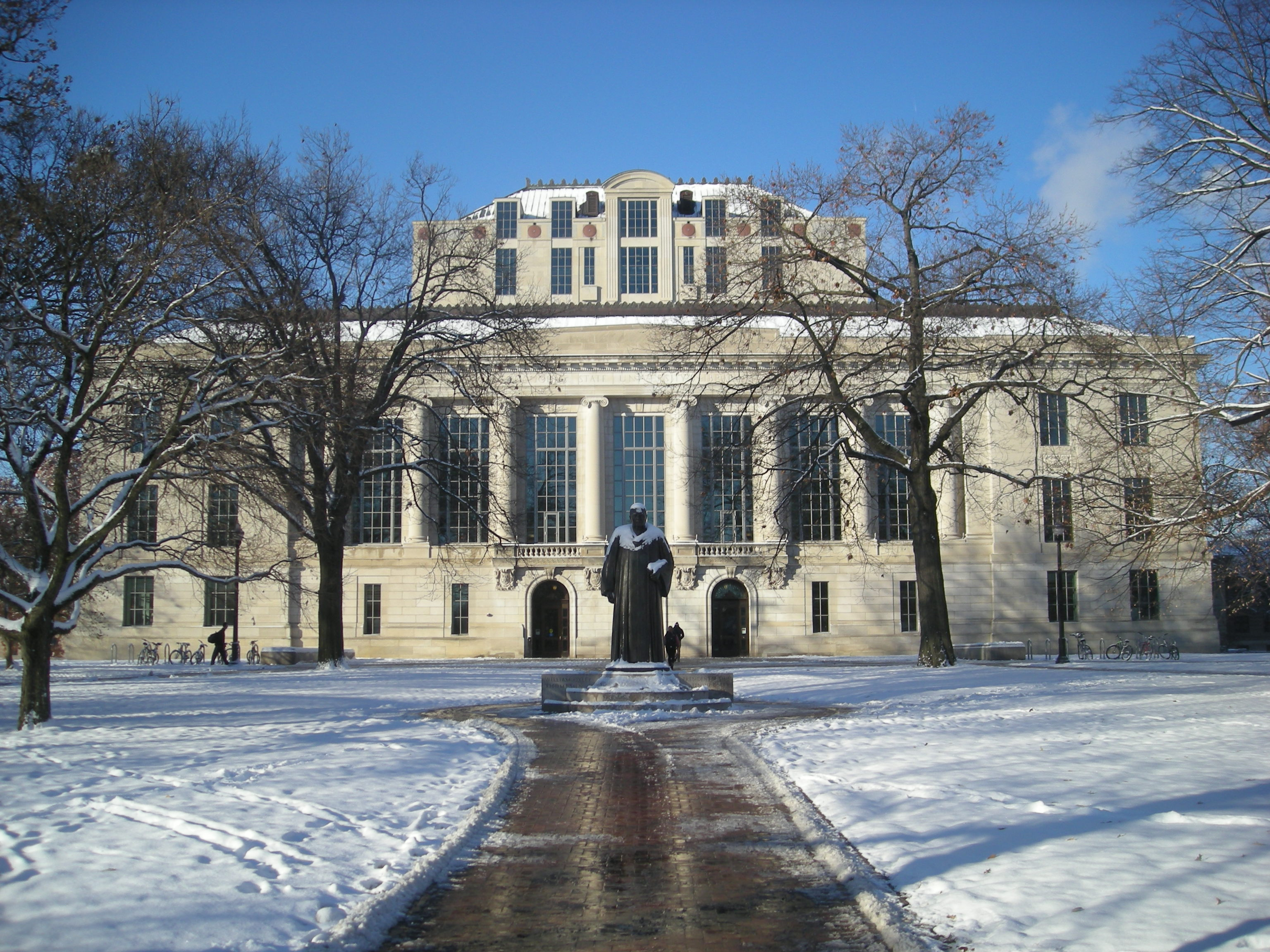
The William Oxley Thompson Memorial Library of Ohio State University, designed by Allen & Collens in the Neoclassical style and completed in 1912

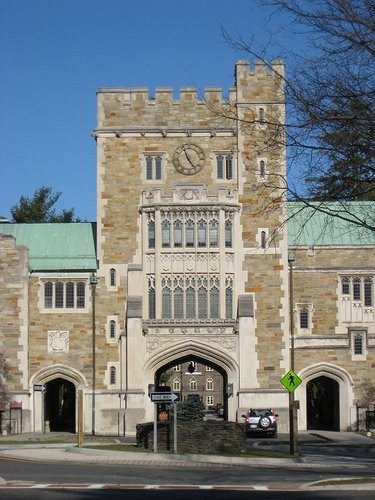
Taylor Hall of Vassar College, designed by Allen & Collens in the Collegiate Gothic style and completed in 1915

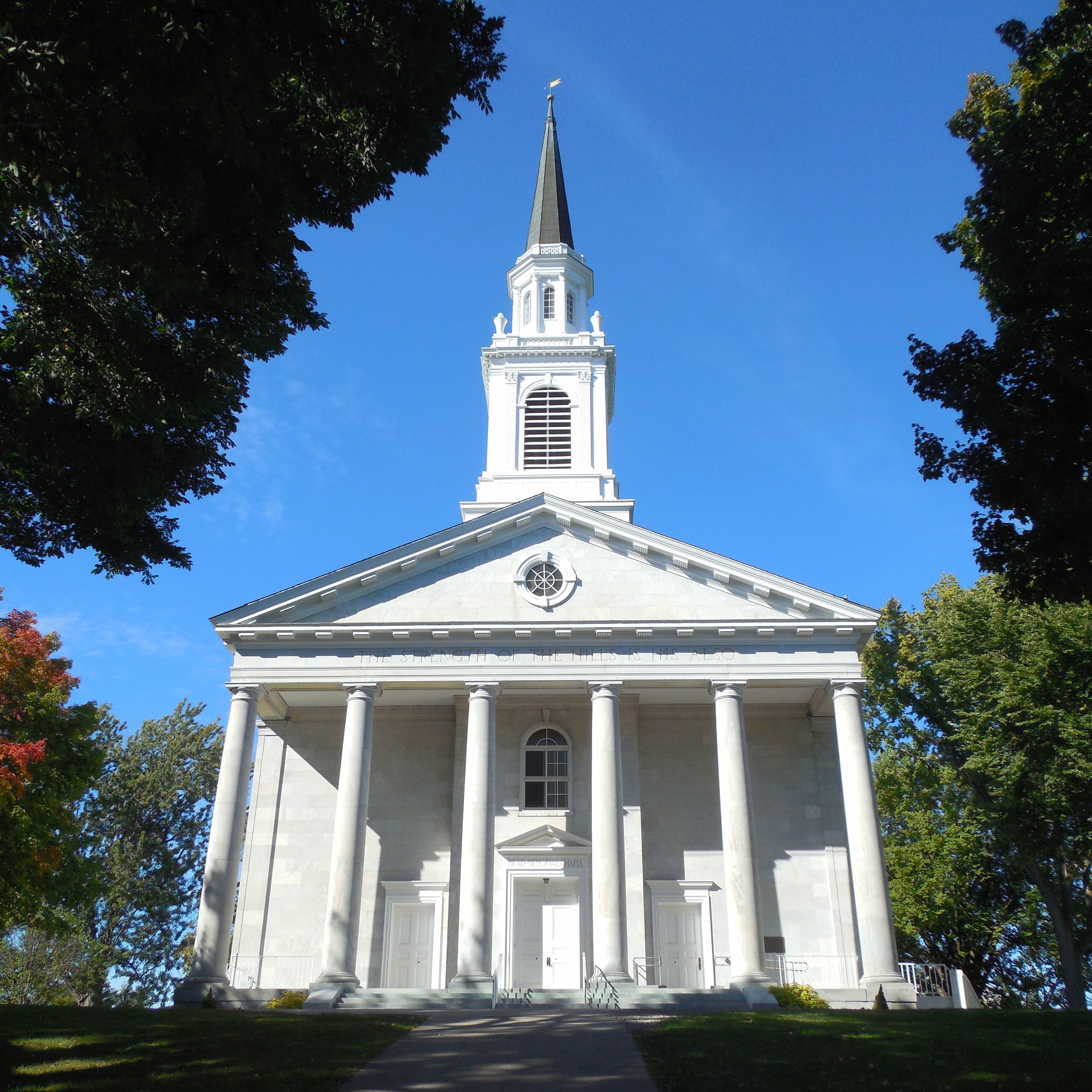
The Mead Memorial Chapel of Middlebury College, designed by Allen & Collens in the Colonial Revival style and completed in 1916

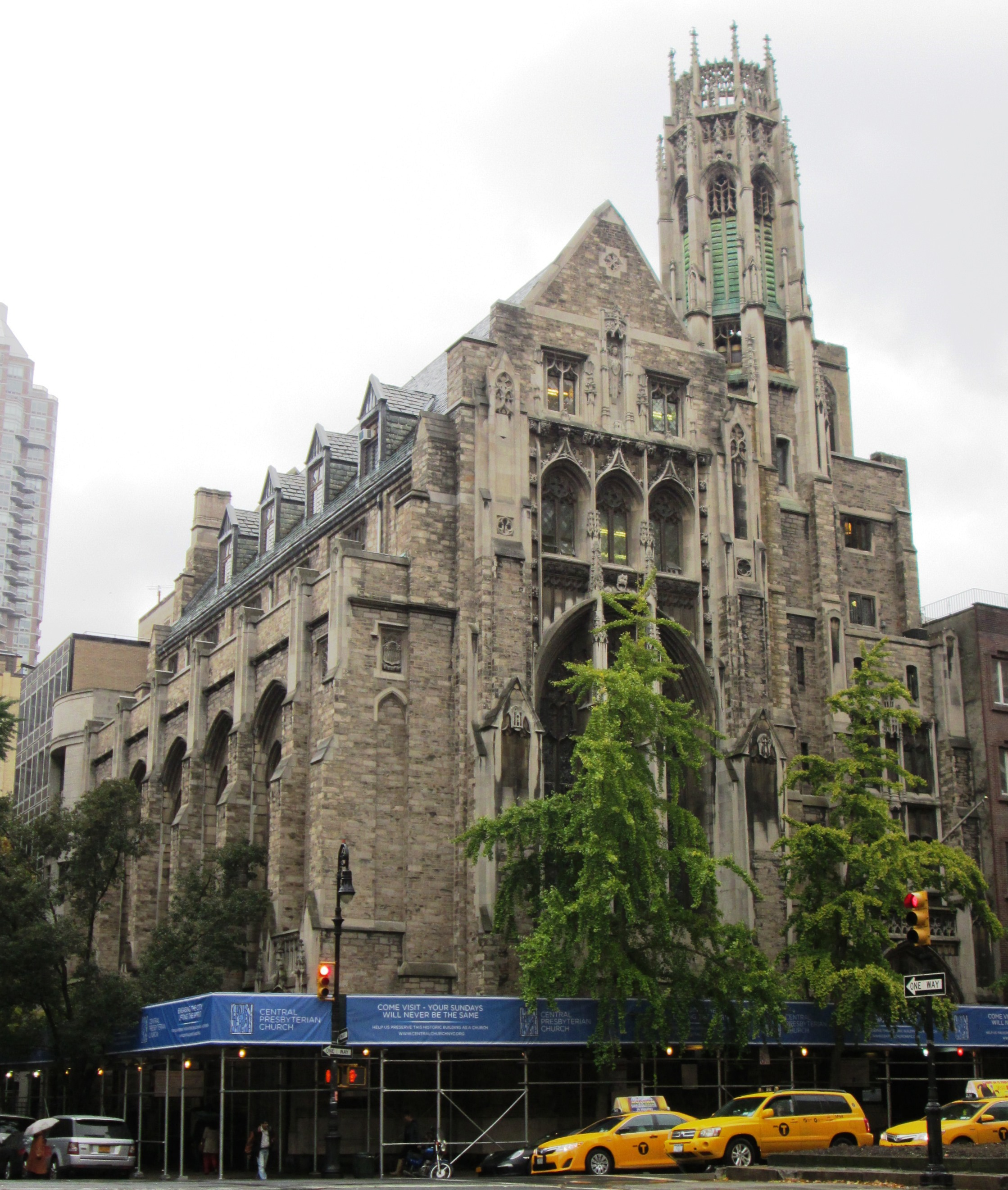
The Central Presbyterian Church in New York City, designed by Allen & Collens and Henry C. Pelton in the Gothic Revival style and completed in 1922; originally the Park Avenue Baptist Church

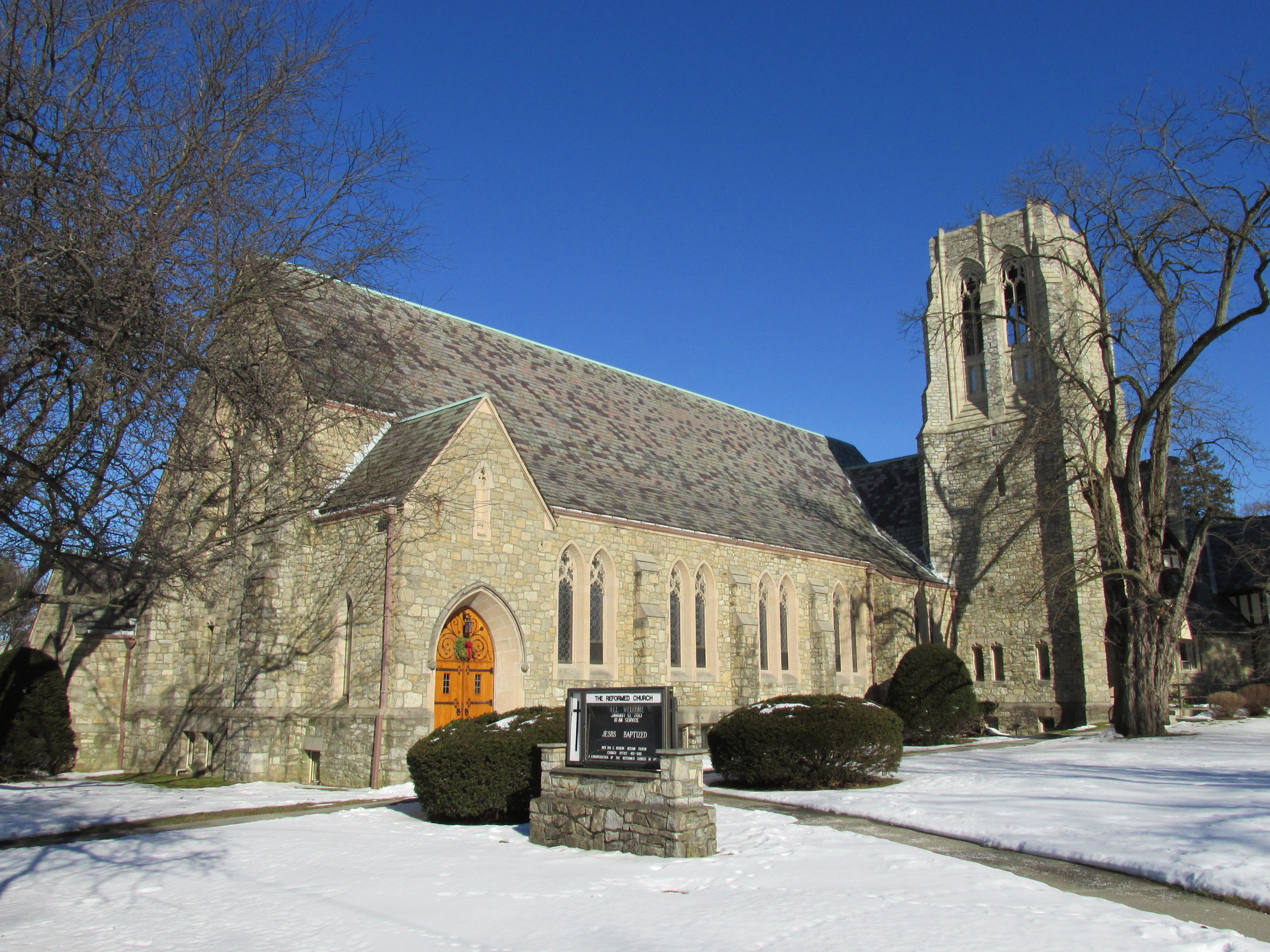
The Reformed Dutch Church of Poughkeepsie, designed by Allen & Collens in the Gothic Revival style and completed in 1923

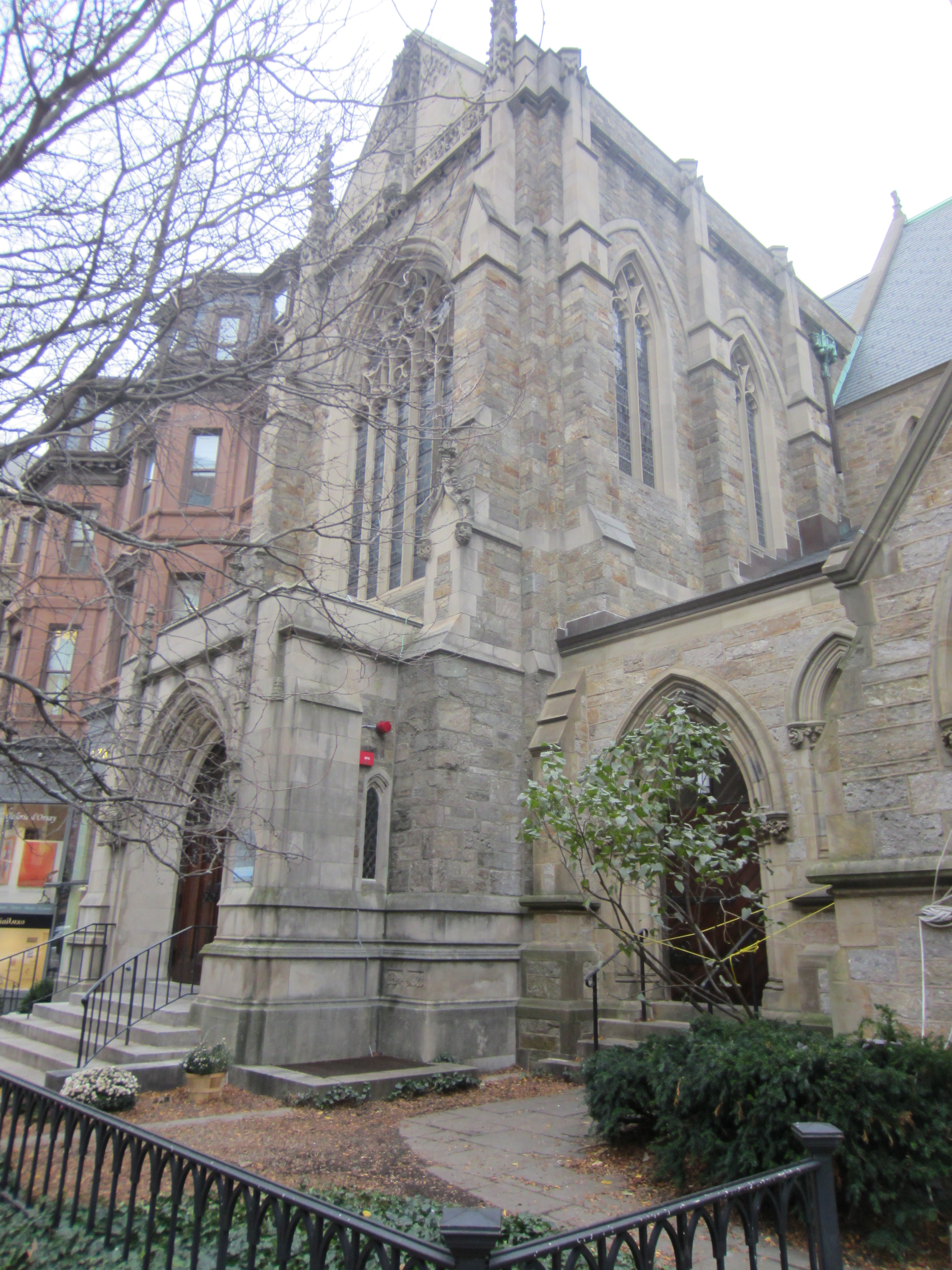
The Leslie Lindsey Memorial Chapel of the Emmanuel Episcopal Church in Boston, designed by Allen & Collens in the Gothic Revival style and completed in 1924

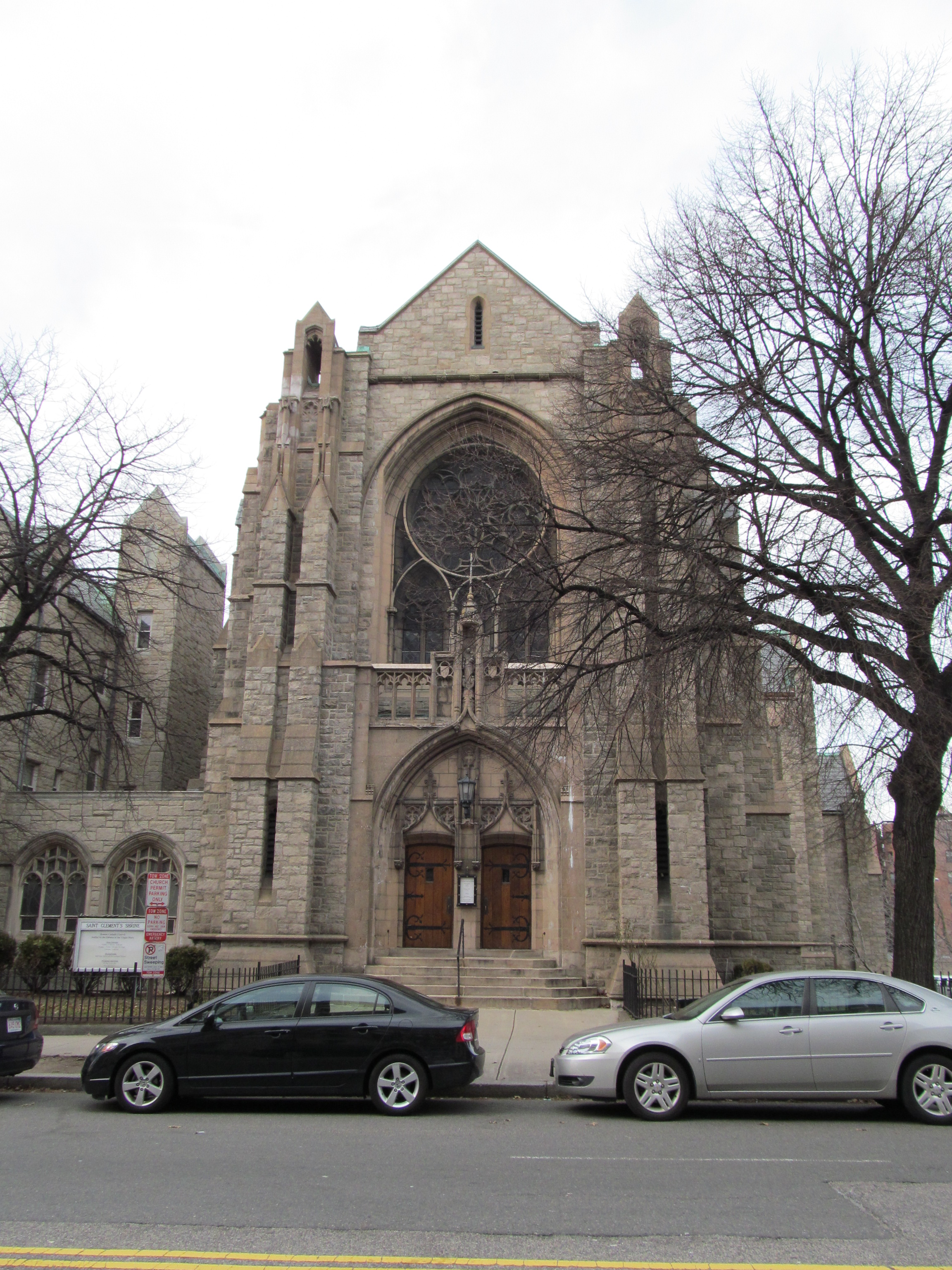
The St. Clement Eucharistic Shrine in Boston, designed by Allen & Collens in the Gothic Revival style and completed in 1924; originally the Church of the Redemption

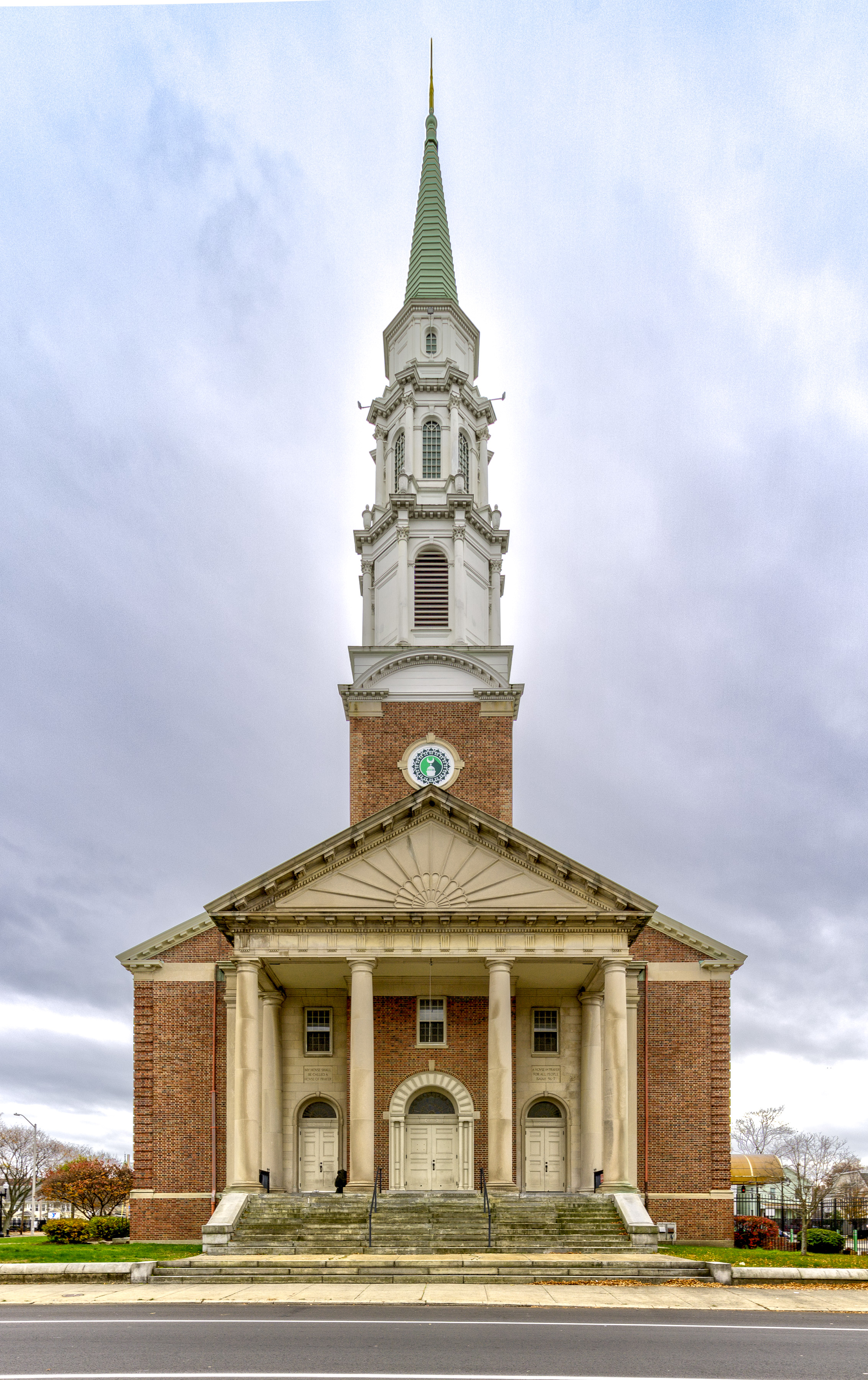
The former United Congregational Church in Bridgeport, Connecticut, designed by Allen & Collens in the Colonial Revival style and completed in 1926

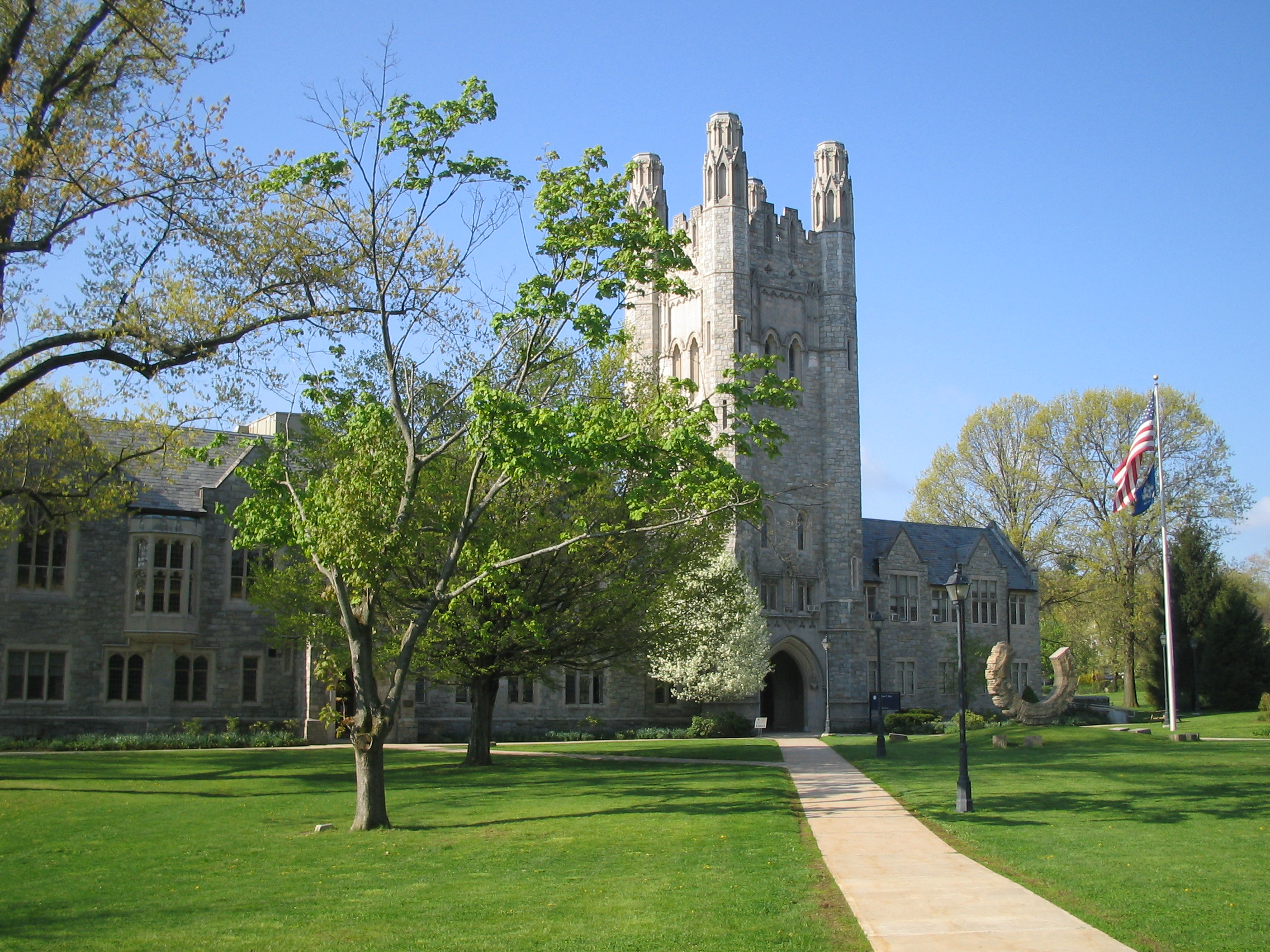
Starr Hall of the University of Connecticut School of Law, designed by Allen & Collens in the Collegiate Gothic style and completed in 1926; originally Avery Hall of the Hartford Seminary Foundation

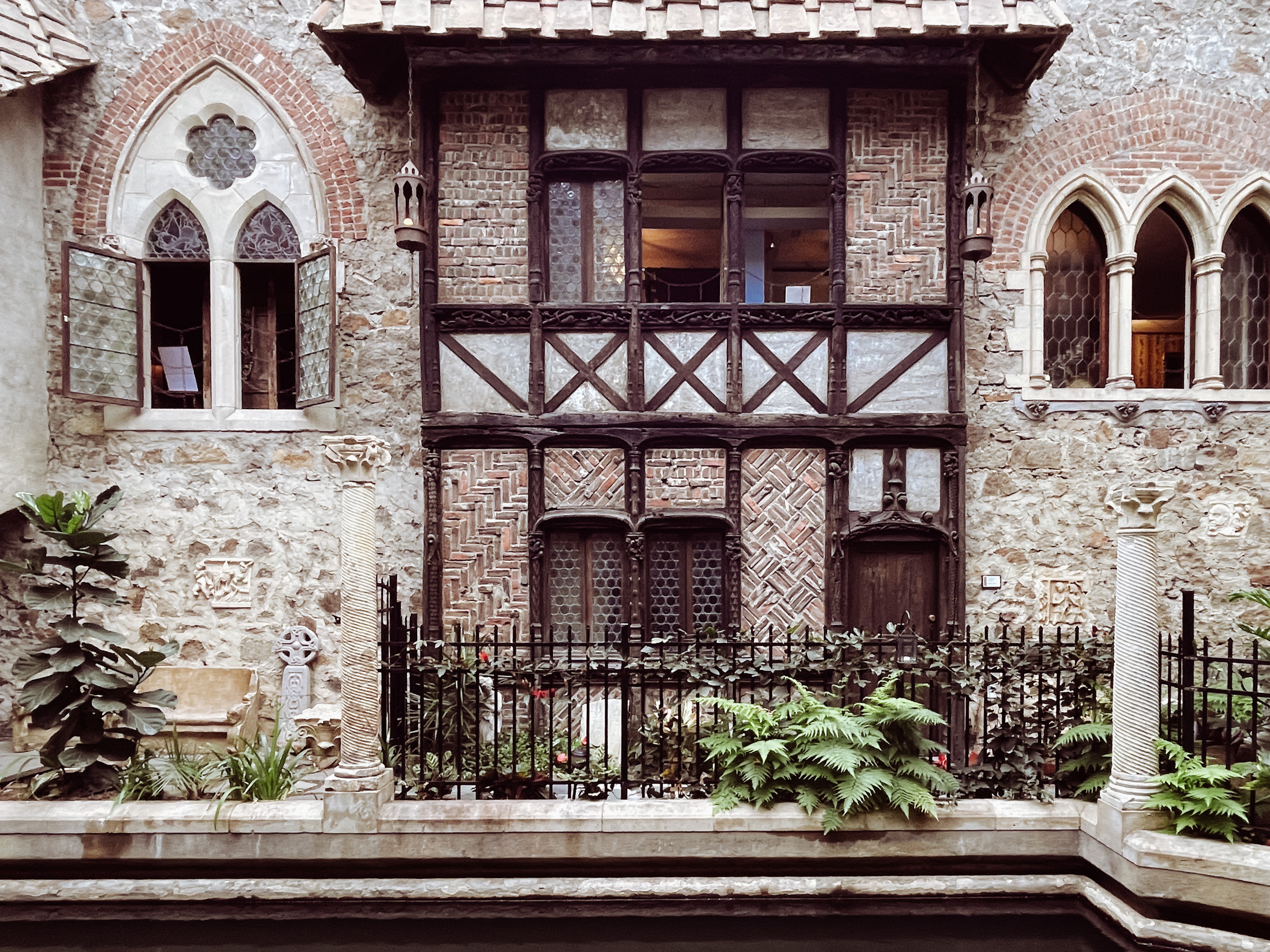
The courtyard of Hammond Castle in Gloucester, designed by Allen & Collens in the Gothic Revival style and completed in 1929

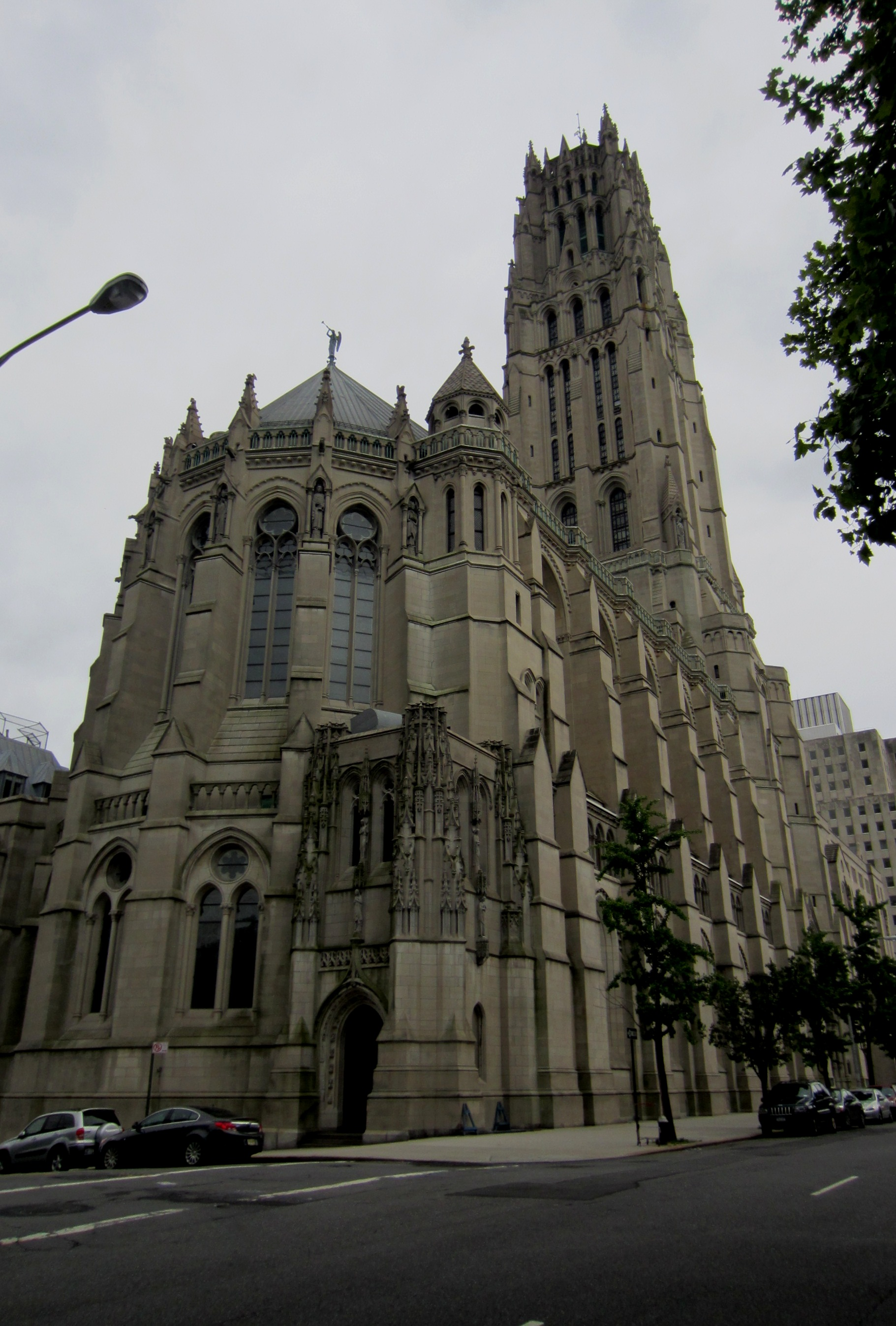
Riverside Church in New York City, designed by Allen & Collens and Henry C. Pelton in the Gothic Revival style and completed in 1930

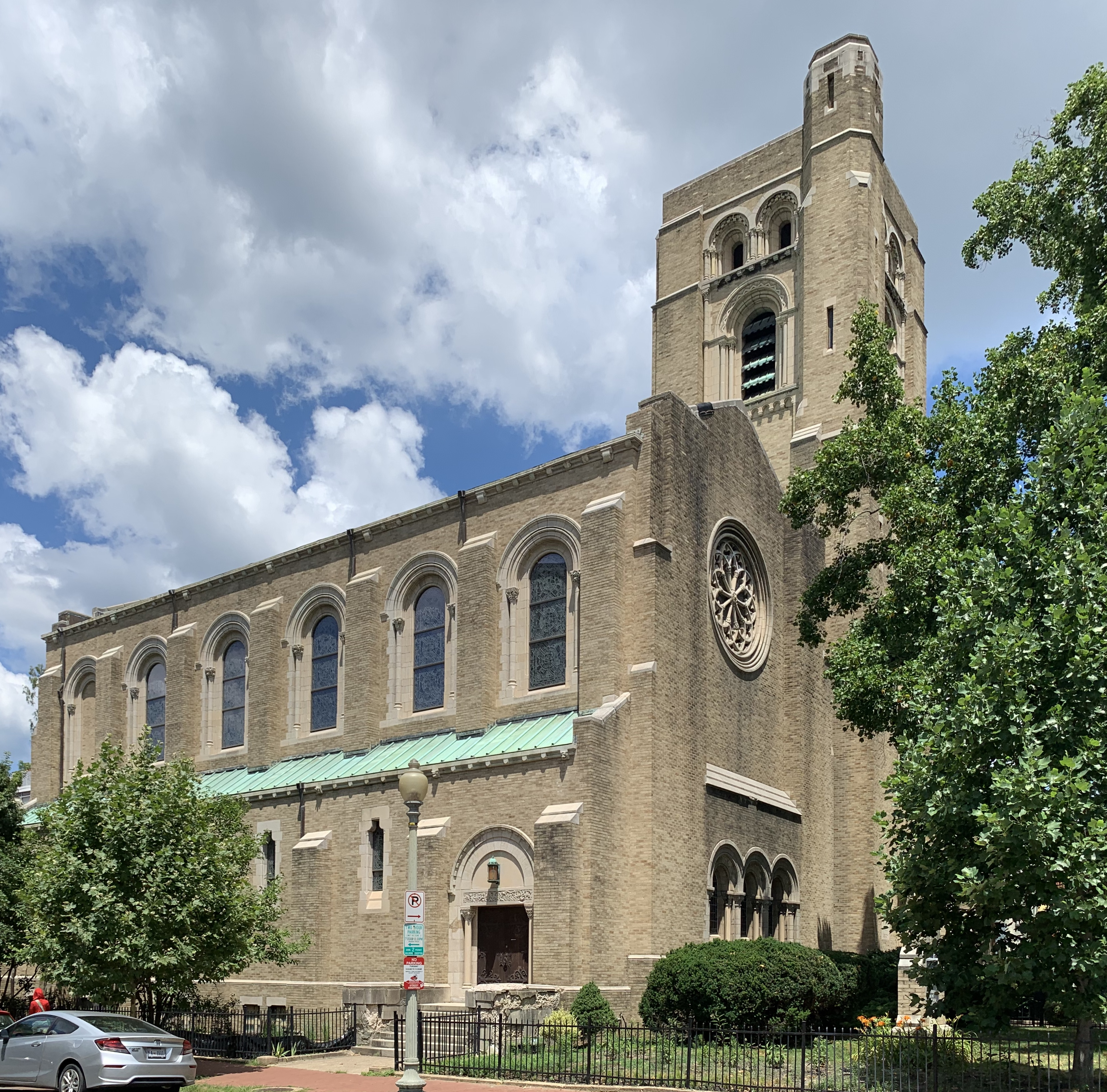
The Universalist National Memorial Church in Washington, D.C., designed by Allen & Collens in the Romanesque Revival style and completed in 1930

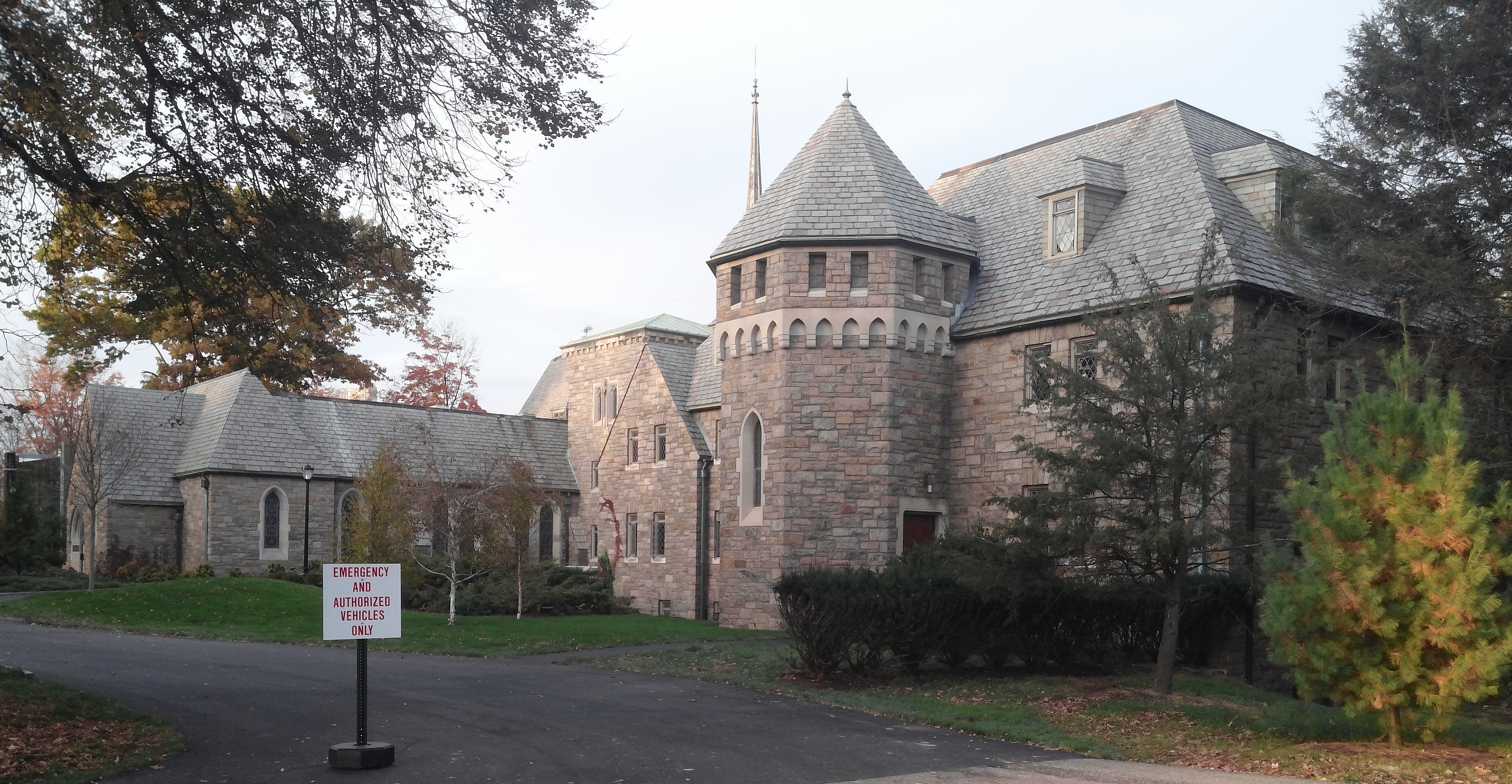
Skinner Hall of Vassar College, designed by Allen & Collens in the Gothic Revival style and completed in 1931

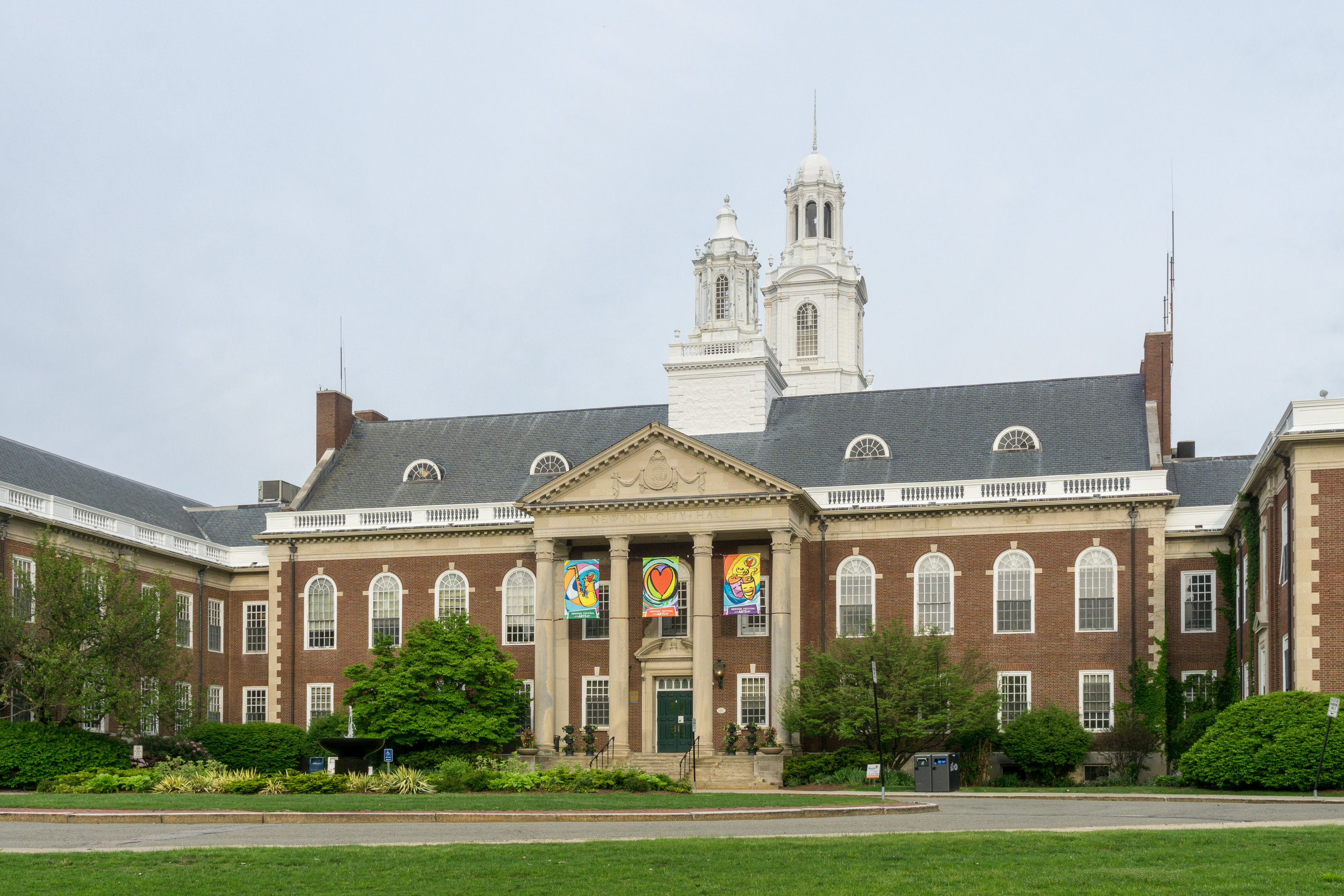
The Newton City Hall and War Memorial in Newton Centre, designed by Allen & Collens in the Colonial Revival style and completed in 1932

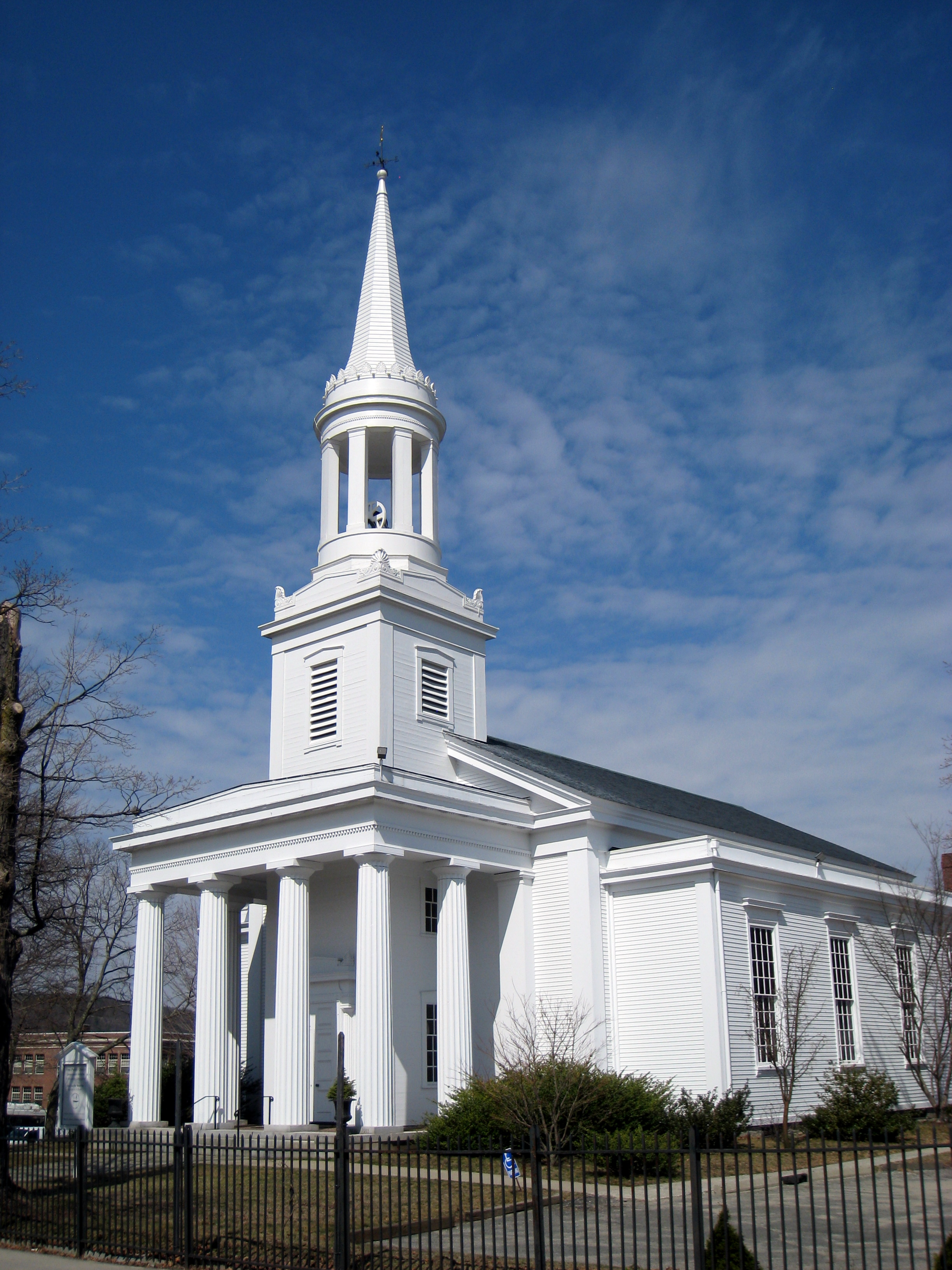
The First Parish Church in Waltham, designed by Allen & Collens in the Greek Revival style and completed in 1933

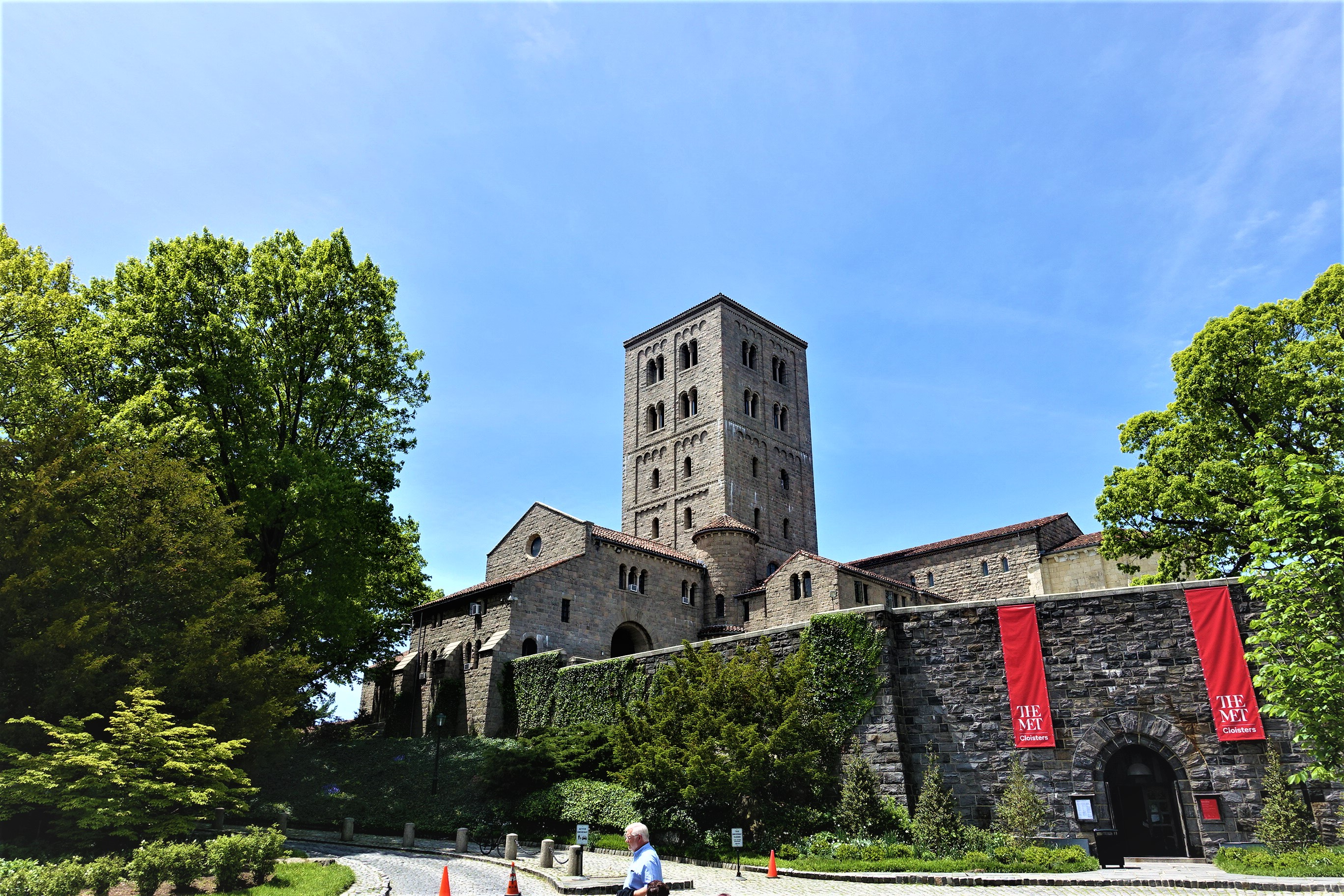
The Cloisters in New York City, designed by Allen, Collens & Willis in the Romanesque Revival style and completed in 1938

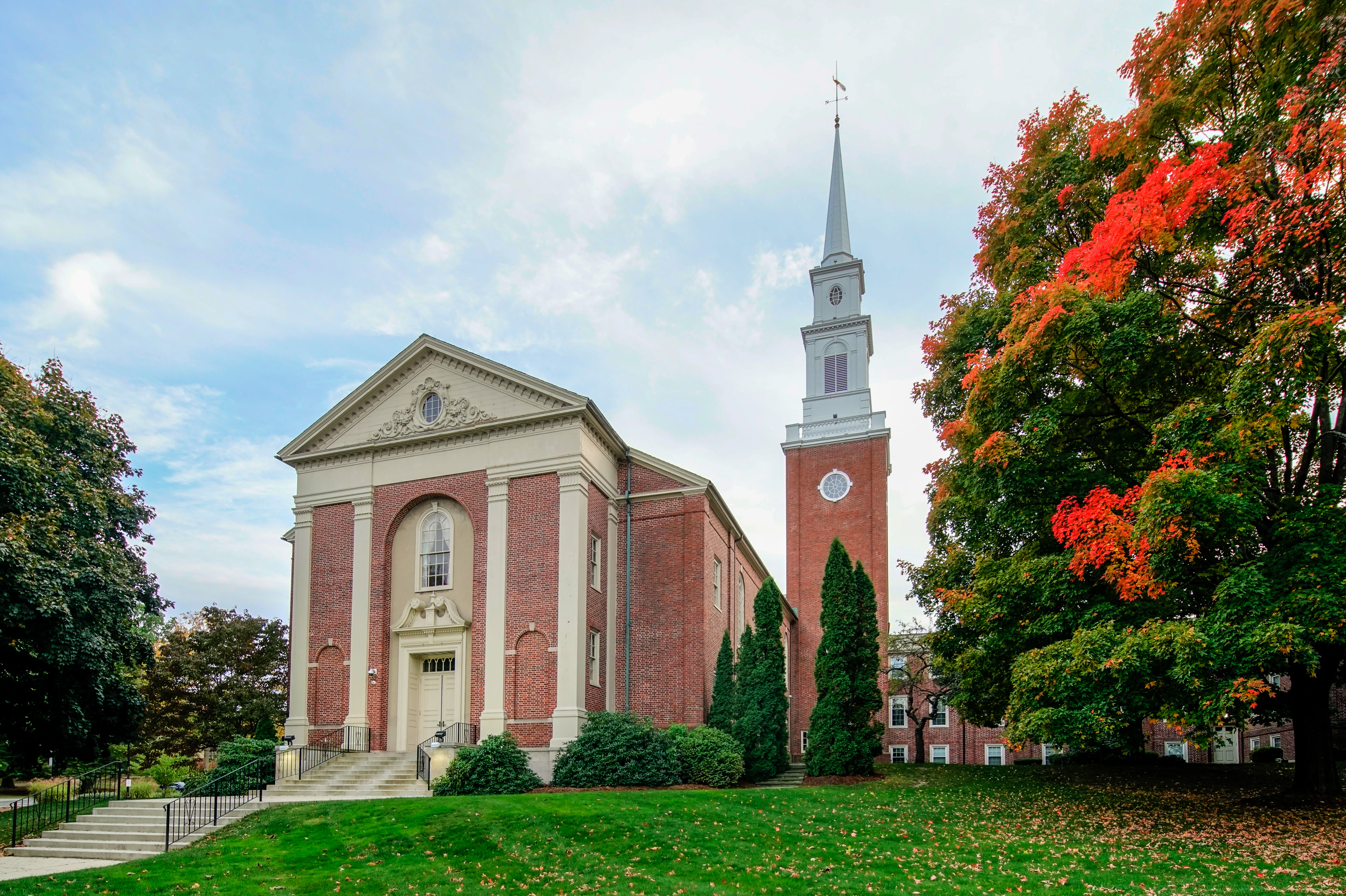
The First Baptist Church in Worcester, designed by Allen, Collens & Willis in the Colonial Revival style and completed in 1939

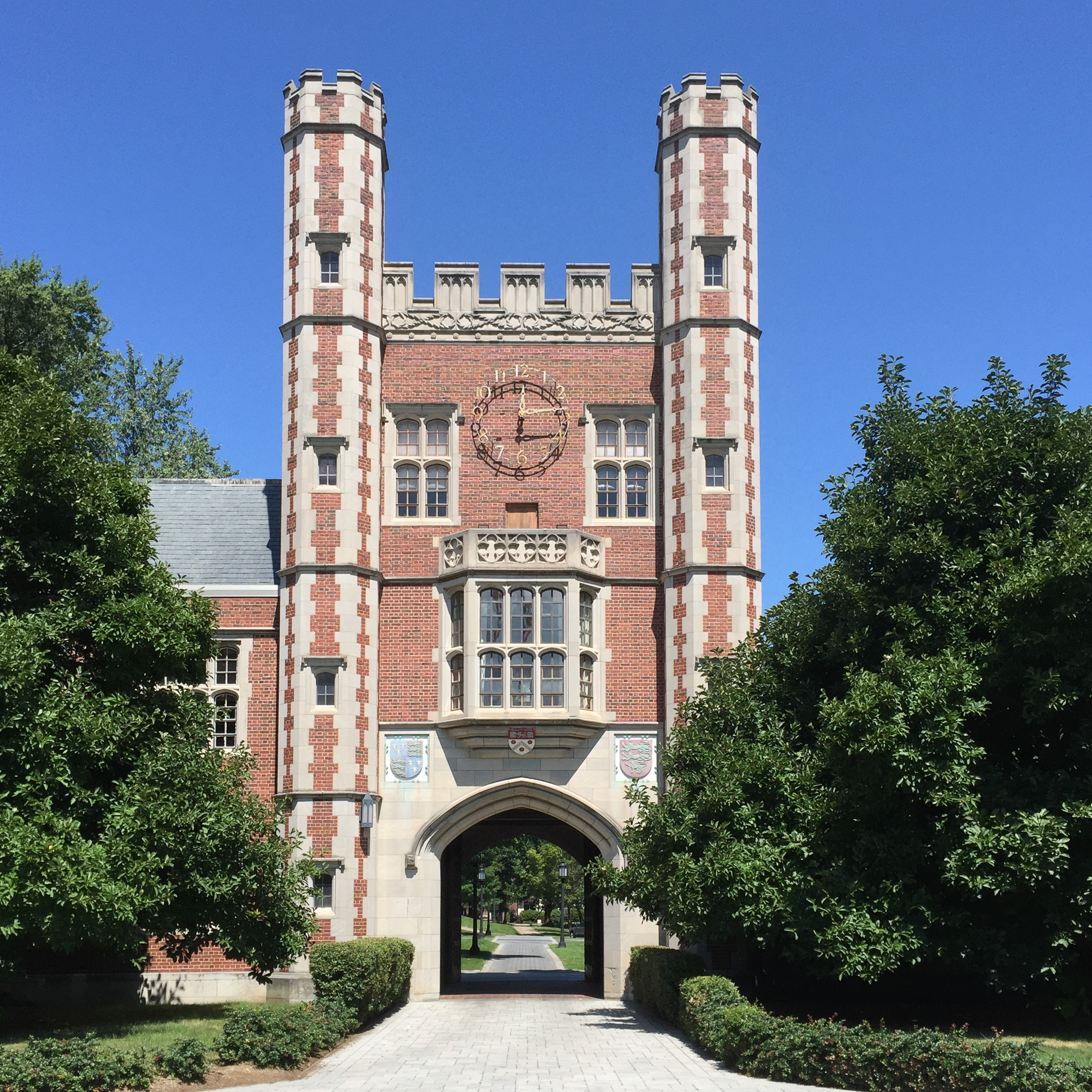
The Downes Memorial Clock Tower of Trinity College, designed by Collens, Willis & Beckonert in the Collegiate Gothic style and completed in 1958

Allen & Collens was an American architectural firm based in Boston. It was initially established by architect Francis R. Allen in 1879. After two early partnerships he formed Allen & Collens in 1903 with Charles Collens. The firm was best known as the designers of Gothic Revival buildings, including the Union Theological Seminary campus and Riverside Church in New York City. Allen and Collens died in 1931 and 1956, respectively, and the firm was continued by Collens's partner, Harold Buckley Willis, until his own death in 1962.

== History ==
Architect Francis R. Allen established his Boston practice in 1879. Circa 1880 he formed the partnership of Allen & Kenway with Welsh-born architect Herbert P. Kenway. Kenway had been trained in Manchester and immigrated to the United States in 1874. Before joining Allen, he had worked for city architect George A. Clough after briefly practicing in Auburn, Maine, where his works included the William A. Robinson House. Their work included Sonnenberg, the Canandaigua, New York, country house of Frederick Ferris Thompson and Mary Clark Thompson. The Thompsons attended the First Congregational Church in Canandaigua, where Allen's brother, Frederick Baylies Allen, was pastor. Mrs. Thompson would become a major client of the Allen firm. In the late 1880s Kenway's health declined and he died in July 1890 while visiting Wales. Allen continued independently until January 1897, when he formed the partnership of Allen & Vance with Joseph McArthur Vance, a former employee then practicing in Pittsfield. They designed Lathrop House and Davison House at Vassar College and in 1899 won a competition to design Woman's Hospital in New York City. Mrs. Thompson was a prominent supporter of the hospital. A change of site meant that their design was not built, but Allen was retained as architect and completed the project on a new site in 1906.

In the meantime the Allen & Vance partnership had been dissolved, and in January 1903 Allen formed Allen & Collens with Charles Collens, an employee recently returned from the École des Beaux-Arts in Paris. In 1925 Allen retired from the partnership. About the same time J. Lawrence Berry and Harold Buckley Willis became partners, though the firm continued as Allen & Collens. Berry had worked for Allen at the turn of the century before opening his own office, though he frequently associated with the firm on individual projects, such as the Marlborough City Hall. His independent works included the North Hampton Library and St. Luke's and St. Margaret's Church, the latter as a member of the firm of Berry & Davidson. He rejoined the firm sometime after World War I. Willis, a decorated veteran of the war, joined the firm in 1920. Berry died in January 1931 followed by Allen in November. The firm was renamed Allen, Collens & Willis c. 1934 when they were joined by architect Edward A. Hubbard, a former partner of Henry Forbes Bigelow. In 1940 Willis, who had served with the American Field Service during World War I, returned to service with that organization. In his absence the firm was renamed Collens, Willis & Hubbard. After the war Willis returned and Hubbard was replaced by Carl A. Beckonert, the firm being renamed a final time to Collens, Willis & Beckonert. Collens died in September 1956, followed by Willis in April 1962. The firm was thereafter dissolved.

== Style and legacy ==
The work of Allen & Collens was greatly influenced by Collens's Beaux-Arts education. The École des Beaux-Arts curriculum centered plan and composition, with a strong emphasis on architectural history, as the foundational elements of design. The prevailing style of the Beaux-Arts was Neoclassical, but in practice American students adapted Beaux-Arts principles to the Gothic Revival style and regional vernacular styles, such as the Colonial Revival style.

Allen & Collens's major work in the Neoclassical style was the monumental William Oxley Thompson Memorial Library of Ohio State University. They won this commission in a limited competition. They developed a national reputation for their Gothic Revival work, which included the Thompson Memorial Library (1905) of Vassar College and the Union Theological Seminary campus (1910) and Riverside Church (1930) in New York City. They admired Gothic architecture for its adaptibility. Like other Beaux-Arts architects they were stylistically flexible and often adapted to the genius loci of a site, such as at Bowdoin College, where Collens found that only the Colonial style was appropriate, or in the First Parish Church (1933) of Waltham, where they channeled the Greek Revival style of the church's 1838 building. Later monumental works included the Christopher Wren-inspired Newton City Hall and War Memorial (1932), winner of the Harleston Parker Medal for 1936, and The Cloisters (1938) in New York City.

Employees of the Allen firm include:

- Reino Aarnio
- H. Daland Chandler
- Rose Connor
- Harry Wright Goodhue
- Louise Hall
- S. Wesley Haynes
- Samuel Eldon Homsey
- Victorine du Pont Homsey
- Lois Lilley Howe
- Juan Nakpil
- Richard Roth

== Partner biographies ==
=== Francis R. Allen ===
Francis Richmond Allen FAIA (November 22, 1843 – November 7, 1931) was born in Boston to Frederick Deane Allen, a dry goods merchant, and Mary Richmond Allen, née Baylies. He was educated at the Boston Latin School and at Amherst College, graduating from the latter in 1865. He then entered his father's dry goods business, Allen, Lane & Company. In 1875, Allen married and bought a house lot on Fairfield Street in the Back Bay. He hired architect W. Whitney Lewis to design the house, which was completed in 1876. This experience apparently triggered a career shift, and that year he left his father's business to enter the Massachusetts Institute of Technology (MIT) architecture school. After a year at MIT he spent another in Paris, studying in the Beaux-Arts atelier of Joseph Auguste Émile Vaudremer. Also studying in the Vaudremer atelier at the time was fellow Bostonian Arthur Rotch. He returned to Boston in 1878 and worked for Peabody & Stearns before opening an office of his own in 1879.

Allen was married to Elizabeth Bradlee Wood. They had two children, both daughters, only one of whom, Dorothy, survived to adulthood. She married yachtsman and Kidder, Peabody & Company partner Chandler Hovey. Allen was a Fellow of the American Institute of Architects and from 1904 to 1925 he was vice president of the Comité permanent international des Architectes, a predecessor to the International Union of Architects. He was a member of the Society of Beaux-Arts Architects, the Boston Society of Architects, the Bostonian Society, the General Society of Colonial Wars, the Country Club, the Mayflower Society and the St. Botolph Club. He died in Boston at the age of 87.

=== Charles Collens ===
Charles Collens FAIA ANA (October 14, 1873 – September 18, 1956) was born in New York City to Charles Terry Collins and Mary Abby Collins, née Wood. Collens and his siblings used the "Collens" spelling of their surname. His father was a native of Hartford, Connecticut, and was Yale-educated pastor. In 1875 he was called to Plymouth Church in Cleveland. His mother was a native of Pittsfield, Massachusetts. Collins died in 1883 and Mrs. Collins raised their children in New Haven. Collens was educated at Yale University, graduating in 1896. For the next year he worked as a private tutor, accompanying a family in Europe and Egypt. In 1897 he joined the Boston office of Peabody & Stearns as a drafter. In 1900 he traveled to Paris and joined the atelier of Jean-Louis Pascal, and he was admitted to the École des Beaux-Arts in September. He returned to Boston in April 1902 and joined Allen's office, and became Allen's partner in January 1903.

Collens was married in 1903 to Margaret Winsor. They had three children, one son and two daughters. Like Allen he was a Fellow of the AIA and was additionally an associate National Academician of the National Academy of Design. He was a member of the Society of Beaux-Arts Architects, the Boston Society of Architects, the Country Club, the St. Botolph Club, the Union Club and the Yale Club. He died in Boston at the age of 82.

== Architectural works ==
=== Francis R. Allen, 1879–1880, 1890–1897 and 1901–1903 ===
- 1880 – Charles G. Wood Jr. and Mary Knight Wood house, 274 Marlborough St, Boston
  - Built for Allen's brother-in-law and his wife. A contributing resource to the NRHP-listed Back Bay Historic District.
- 1893 – Main Building annex, Vassar College, Poughkeepsie, New York
  - Funded by trustee Frederick Ferris Thompson. The first of the Allen firm's projects for Vassar College. Demolished when the Main Building was restored.
- 1893 – Strong House, Vassar College, Poughkeepsie, New York
  - Funded by trustee John D. Rockefeller and named for his daughter.
- 1893 – Thompson Biology, Chemistry and Physical Laboratories, Williams College, Williamstown, Massachusetts
  - Funded by Frederick Ferris Thompson. After a fire Thompson Chemistry Laboratory was replaced by Allen & Collens in 1916. All three now incorporated into the Science Center.
- 1894 – Frederick Baylies Allen house, 45 Brewster St, Cambridge, Massachusetts
  - Built for Allen's brother.
- 1894 – Grove Hall Universalist Church (former), 70 Washington St, Dorchester, Boston
- 1895 – Berkshire County Savings Bank Building, 28 North St, Pittsfield, Massachusetts
  - A contributing resource to the Park Square Historic District.
- 1895 – St. Luke's and St. Margaret's Church chapel and rectory, 5 St Lukes Rd, Allston, Boston
  - NRHP-listed.
- 1897 – Raymond House, Vassar College, Poughkeepsie, New York
- 1902 – Christ Church, 105 Christ Church Rd, Dark Harbor, Maine
  - NRHP-listed.
- 1903 – Walpole Public Library (former), 65 Common St, Walpole, Massachusetts
  - Designed by Francis R. Allen and J. Lawrence Berry, associated architects.

=== Allen & Kenway, 1880–1890 ===
- 1881 – Daniel C. Knowlton house, 344 Beacon St, Boston
  - A contributing resource to the NRHP-listed Back Bay Historic District.
- 1882 – Lucien Carr house, 346 Beacon St, Boston
  - A contributing resource to the NRHP-listed Back Bay Historic District.
- 1882 – Charles A. Kidder house, 269 Commonwealth Ave, Boston
  - A contributing resource to the NRHP-listed Back Bay Historic District.
- 1883 – James Wentworth Brown house, Brownleigh Hall, Grove and Charles River Sts, Needham, Massachusetts
  - Destroyed by fire in 1926.
- 1883 – Robert Dawson Evans house, 324 Beacon St, Boston
  - Demolished.
- 1883 – Charles Eustis Hubbard house, 386 Marlborough St, Boston
  - A contributing resource to the NRHP-listed Back Bay Historic District.
- 1883 – Albert Metcalf house, 170 Chestnut St, West Newton, Massachusetts
  - A contributing resource to the NRHP-listed West Newton Hill Historic District.
- 1885 – William Henry Allen house, 291 Commonwealth Ave, Boston
  - A contributing resource to the NRHP-listed Back Bay Historic District.
- 1885 – Alexander Moseley house, 282 Commonwealth Ave, Boston
  - A contributing resource to the NRHP-listed Back Bay Historic District.
- 1887 – Costello C. Converse house, 348 Beacon St, Boston
  - Built for the son of Elisha S. Converse, donor of the Converse Memorial Library in Malden. A contributing resource to the NRHP-listed Back Bay Historic District.
- 1887 – Richard Hodges house, 408 Beacon St, Boston
  - A contributing resource to the NRHP-listed Back Bay Historic District.
- 1887 – Frederick Ferris Thompson and Mary Clark Thompson house, Sonnenberg, 250 Gibson St, Canandaigua, New York
  - Originally designed in the Queen Anne style. A circa 1900 remodeling for Mrs. Thompson by Allen & Vance changed it to the Tudor Revival style. NRHP-listed.
- 1888 – Gardiner Greene Hubbard house, Twin Oaks, 3225 Woodley Road NW, Washington, D.C.
  - NRHP-listed, also a contributing resource to the NRHP-listed Cleveland Park Historic District.
- 1890 – Hopkins Hall, Williams College, Williamstown, Massachusetts
  - Funded by Frederick Ferris Thompson as a memorial to Mark Hopkins. The first of the Allen firm's projects for Williams College.
- 1892 – Talbot Building additions, Boston University medical campus, Boston
  - Allen & Kenway completed wings along East Concord and Stoughton Streets in 1884 and 1892, respectively.

=== Allen & Vance, 1897–1901 ===
- 1899 – Emmanuel Episcopal Church, 15 Newbury St, Boston
  - A near total rebuilding of the church, originally completed in 1861 by Alexander Rice Esty. The only significant part of Esty's design to remain was the main facade. The first major ecclesiastical project completed by the Allen firm. A contributing resource to the NRHP-listed Back Bay Historic District.
- 1899 – Hallowell City Hall, 1 Winthrop St, Hallowell, Maine
  - A contributing resource to the NRHP-listed Hallowell Historic District.
- 1900 – Richmond Hotel, Main St, North Adams, Massachusetts
  - Demolished.
- 1901 – Lathrop House, Vassar College, Poughkeepsie, New York
- 1902 – Aspinwall Hotel, Kennedy Park, Lenox, Massachusetts
  - Destroyed by fire in 1931.
- 1902 – Davison House, Vassar College, Poughkeepsie, New York
  - Funded by trustee John D. Rockefeller and named for his mother.

=== Allen & Collens, 1903–1934 ===
- 1904 – First Church of Christ, Scientist, 33 School St, Concord, New Hampshire
  - A contributing resource to the NRHP-listed Downtown Concord Historic District.
- 1905 – Thompson Memorial Chapel, Williams College, Williamstown, Massachusetts
  - Funded by Mary Clark Thompson.
- 1905 – Thompson Memorial Library, Vassar College, Poughkeepsie, New York
  - Funded by Mary Clark Thompson. Allen, Collens & Willis added Van Ingen Hall in 1937.
- 1906 – Robert Dawson Evans house, 34 Welch Rd, Brookline, Massachusetts
  - A contributing resource to the NRHP-listed Brookline Town Green Historic District.
- 1906 – Fitch House, Williams College, Williamstown, Massachusetts
- 1906 – Marlborough City Hall, 140 Main St, Marlborough, Massachusetts
  - Designed by Allen & Collens and J. Lawrence Berry, associated architects. A contributing resource to the NRHP-listed Marlborough Center Historic District.
- 1906 – State Street Trust Company, Back Bay branch, 130 Massachusetts Ave, Boston
  - Now occupied by the Berklee College of Music.
- 1906 – Woman's Hospital, W 110th St and Amsterdam Ave, New York City
  - Demolished.
- 1910 – Flatbush-Tompkins Congregational Church, 424 E 19th St, Brooklyn
  - Designed by Allen & Collens, architects, with Louis E. Jallade, associate architect. Allen & Collens completed an adjacent parish house in 1925. A contributing resource to the NRHP-listed Ditmas Park Historic District.
- 1910 – Chandler Hovey house, 32 Lawrence Rd, Chestnut Hill, Massachusetts
  - Built for Allen's daughter and son-in-law. A contributing resource to the NRHP-listed Old Chestnut Hill Historic District.
- 1910 – Thompson Hall, Williams College, Williamstown, Massachusetts
  - Funded by Mary Clark Thompson.
- 1910 – Union Theological Seminary campus, New York City
  - Designed by Allen & Collens, architects, with Louis E. Jallade, associate architect. NRHP-listed, also a New York City Landmark.
- 1911 – Swartz Hall, Harvard Divinity School, Cambridge, Massachusetts
  - Originally named Andover Hall for its original occupant, the Andover Theological Seminary.
- 1911 – United States Post Office (former), 28 N Main St, Canandaigua, New York
  - The Treasury selected Allen & Collens as architects for this building on the condition that Mary Clark Thompson paid the architect's fee. NRHP-listed.
- 1912 – Charles Collens houses, 78–82 Southbourne Rd, Jamaica Plain, Boston
  - Built as part of Woodbourne, a model working-class neighborhood developed by Robert Winsor that never achieved its goals. Winsor was a first cousin of Collens's wife. A contributing resource to the NRHP-listed Woodbourne Historic District.
- 1912 – Josselyn House, Vassar College, Poughkeepsie, New York
- 1912 – Lawrence + Memorial Hospital, 365 Montauk Ave, New London, Connecticut
- 1912 – William Oxley Thompson Memorial Library, Ohio State University, Columbus, Ohio
  - Originally known as the Main Library and unrelated to Mary Clark Thompson.
- 1912 – Mary Pickard Winsor house, 160 Dudley Rd, Newton, Massachusetts
  - Winsor was the founder of the Winsor School and a daughter of Robert Winsor, a first cousin of Collens's wife.
- 1913 – Knox United Church, 506 4 St SW, Calgary, Alberta, Canada
  - Designed by Lawson & Fordyce, architects, with Allen & Collens, consulting architects. Allen & Collens were chiefly responsible for the design. A Calgary Municipal Historic Resource.
- 1913 – Sargent Gymnasium, Bowdoin College, Brunswick, Maine
  - Designed by Allen & Collens and Felix A. Burton, associated architects.
- 1914 – St. Stephen's Episcopal Church, 351 Main St, Ridgefield, Connecticut
  - Designed by Allen & Collens and W. Kerr Rainsford, associated architects. A contributing resource to the NRHP-listed Ridgefield Center Historic District.
- 1915 – Arthur Curtiss James House, 39 E 69th St, New York City
  - Demolished. Allen & Collens also completed outbuildings at James's Newport, Rhode Island, estate, which survive.
- 1915 – Taylor Hall, Vassar College, Poughkeepsie, New York
- 1916 – Mead Memorial Chapel, Middlebury College, Middlebury, Vermont
- 1916 – Second Church in Newton, 60 High St, West Newton, Massachusetts
  - NRHP-listed.
- 1917 – Dudley Coe Building, Bowdoin College, Brunswick, Maine
  - Designed by Allen & Collens and Felix A. Burton, associated architects.
- 1917 – First National Bank Building, 106 Maine St, Brunswick, Maine
  - Designed by Allen & Collens and Felix A. Burton, associated architects. A contributing resource to the NRHP-listed Brunswick Commercial Historic District.
- 1918 – Hyde Hall, Bowdoin College, Brunswick, Maine
  - Designed by Allen & Collens and Felix A. Burton, associated architects.
- 1918 – Vincent and Nancy Marturano Youth YMCA, 465 Main St, Brockton, Massachusetts
- 1921 – Augustus H. Fiske house, Kickemuit, 1 Barton Ave, Warren, Rhode Island
  - One of Willis's earliest designs for the firm.
- 1921 – United Congregational Church of Holyoke, 300 Appleton St, Holyoke, Massachusetts
  - Incorporating the tower of the former church, completed in 1885 to a design by Henry F. Kilburn and destroyed by fire in 1919. Allen & Collens designed the adjacent Skinner Memorial Chapel in 1912. A contributing resource to the NRHP-listed North High Street Historic District.
- 1922 – Park Avenue Baptist Church, 593 Park Ave, New York City
  - Sold to the Central Presbyterian Church in 1928 as the Baptists were building their new home, Riverside Church. Designed by Allen & Collens and Henry C. Pelton, associated architects.
- 1923 – Reformed Dutch Church of Poughkeepsie, 70 Hooker Ave, Poughkeepsie, New York
  - NRHP-listed.
- 1924 – Christ Episcopal Church (former), 25 The Green, Watertown, Connecticut
  - A contributing resource to the NRHP-listed Watertown Center Historic District.
- 1924 – Church of the Redemption (former), 1105 Boylston St, Boston
  - Acquired by the Roman Catholic Archdiocese of Boston in 1935 and known as the St. Clement Eucharistic Shrine since 1945.
- 1924 – Emmanuel Episcopal Church Leslie Lindsey Memorial Chapel, 15 Newbury St, Boston
  - The chapel's decorative scheme was developed by Ninian Comper. A contributing resource to the NRHP-listed Back Bay Historic District.
- 1924 – Russell Hall, Teachers College, Columbia University, New York City
- 1924 – Webster Memorial Building, 36 Trumbull St, Hartford, Connecticut
  - NRHP-listed.
- 1925 – First Congregational Church parish house, 21 Church St, Winchester, Massachusetts
  - Designed by Robert Coit, architect, with Allen & Collens, associate architects. A contributing resource to the NRHP-listed Winchester Center Historic District.
- 1925 – Leslie Buswell house, Stillington Hall, Stillington Dr, Gloucester, Massachusetts
  - This house incorporates extensive architectural salvage from English and American Colonial homes. Harold B. Willis, the principal designer, served with Buswell in the American Field Service during World War I. Buswell was a close friend and probable lover of John Hays Hammond Jr., for whom Allen & Collens also built Hammond Castle in 1929.
- 1926 – Hartford Seminary Foundation (former campus), Hartford, Connecticut
  - Now home to the University of Connecticut School of Law. NRHP-listed.
- 1926 – United Congregational Church (former), 877 Park Ave, Bridgeport, Connecticut
  - This building is now home to the Bridgeport Islamic Community Center. NRHP-listed.
- 1927 – Cushing House, Vassar College, Poughkeepsie, New York
- 1927 – Wimpfheimer Nursery School, Vassar College, Poughkeepsie, New York
- 1928 – Wallington Presbyterian Church, 9 Bond St, Wallington, New Jersey
- 1929 – Golden Hill United Methodist Church, 210 Elm St, Bridgeport, Connecticut
  - Designed by Allen & Collens, architects, with Ernest G. Southey, associate architect. A contributing resource to the NRHP-listed Golden Hill Historic District.
- 1929 – John Hays Hammond Jr. house, Abbadia Mare, 80 Hesperus Ave, Gloucester, Massachusetts
  - This house incorporates a large amount of architectural ormanent salvaged by Hammond from Europe. It was designed principally by Harold B. Willis with input from Henry Davis Sleeper. Hammond was a close friend and probable lover of Leslie Buswell, for whom Allen & Collens built Stillington Hall in 1925. Commonly known as Hammond Castle. NRHP-listed.
- 1929 – Trinity United Methodist Church, 361 Sumner Ave, Springfield, Massachusetts
- 1930 – Kenneth Barnitz Gilbert Parson house, 5 Concord Rd, Weston, Massachusetts
  - Based on Westover Plantation.
- 1930 – Riverside Church, 490 Riverside Dr, New York City
  - Designed by Allen & Collens and Henry C. Pelton, associated architects. Funded by John D. Rockefeller Jr. NRHP-listed, also a New York City Landmark.
- 1930 – Universalist National Memorial Church, 1810 16th St NW, Washington, D.C.
  - A contributing resource to the NRHP-listed Sixteenth Street Historic District.
- 1931 – Christ Episcopal Church parish house, 470 Maple St, Winnetka, Illinois
- 1931 – Huguenot Memorial Church parish house, 901 Pelhamdale Ave, Pelham Manor, New York
- 1931 – Skinner Hall, Vassar College, Poughkeepsie, New York
  - Winner of the Harleston Parker Medal for 1936. NRHP-listed.
- 1932 – Newton City Hall and War Memorial, 1000 Commonwealth Ave, Newton Centre, Massachusetts
  - NRHP-listed.
- 1932 – St. Peter's Episcopal Church parish house, 838 Massachusetts Ave, Cambridge, Massachusetts
  - A contributing resource to the NRHP-listed Central Square Historic District.
- 1932 – United Parish in Brookline rebuilding, 210 Harvard St, Brookline, Massachusetts
  - Originally designed by Edward Tuckerman Potter and completed in 1873. Gutted by fire in 1931, reconstruction and new interior by Allen & Collens.
- 1933 – First Parish Church, 50 Church St, Waltham, Massachusetts
  - NRHP-listed.
- 1933 – Kenyon Hall, Vassar College, Poughkeepsie, New York
- 1933 – Old South Church parish house, 645 Boylston St, Boston
- 1933 – St. Paul's Episcopal Church rebuilding, 80 Pleasant St, Brockton, Massachusetts
  - Originally designed by Ralph Adams Cram and completed in 1893. Gutted by fire in the early 1930s, reconstruction and new interior by Allen & Collens.

=== Allen, Collens & Willis, 1934–1940 ===
- 1935 – Forest Hills Covenant Church, 455 Arborway, Jamaica Plain, Boston
- 1936 – Hope Central Church, 85 Seaverns Ave, Jamaica Plain, Boston
  - A contributing resource to the NRHP-listed Sumner Hill Historic District.
- 1937 – Chapman Hall, Milwaukee-Downer College, Milwaukee
- 1937 – Old South Church campanile, 645 Boylston St, Boston
  - The original, leaning, campanile was removed in the early 1930s due to structural damage discovered during the construction of the parish house.
- 1938 – Abbey Memorial Chapel, Mount Holyoke College, South Hadley, Massachusetts
  - Incorporating the existing Mary Lyon Chapel, completed by Gardner, Pyne & Gardner in 1897, as the chancel.
- 1938 – Frances Clark house, 3 Swallow Cave Rd, Nahant, Massachusetts
  - An early example of Modernism in the firm's work. Altered.
- 1938 – The Cloisters, 99 Margaret Corbin Dr, New York City
  - The interior incorporates extensive architectural salvage from Europe. The exterior is modern in construction and based on the church at Monsempron-Libos in France. NRHP-listed, also a New York City Landmark.
- 1939 – First Baptist Church, 111 Park Ave, Worcester, Massachusetts

=== Collens, Willis & Hubbard, 1940–1945 ===
- 1941 – Harvard-Epworth United Methodist Church remodeling, 1555 Massachusetts Ave, Cambridge, Massachusetts

=== Collens, Willis & Beckonert, 1945–1962 ===
- 1950 – Quincy Point Congregational Church, 444 Washington St, Quincy, Massachusetts
- 1950 – Weston High School, 16 Alphabet Ln, Weston, Massachusetts
  - Later the Field Elementary School, demolished in 2015.
- 1952 – Abbey-Appleton Hall, Springfield College, Springfield, Massachusetts
- 1955 – Trinity Episcopal Church education wing, 131 W Emerson St, Melrose, Massachusetts
- 1958 – Downes Memorial Clock Tower, Trinity College, Hartford, Connecticut
  - Modeled on the Trinity College Clock of Trinity College, Cambridge. A contributing resource to the NRHP-listed Trinity College Long Walk historic district.
- 1959 – Riverside Church Martin Luther King Jr. wing, 490 Riverside Dr, New York City
- 1960 – Interchurch Center, 475 Riverside Dr, New York City
  - Designed by Collens, Willis & Beckonert and Voorhees, Walker, Smith, Smith & Haines, associated architects.
