= Mary Glasspool =

American Episcopal bishop (born 1954)

The Right Reverend Mary Glasspool
- Assistant Bishop of Massachusetts
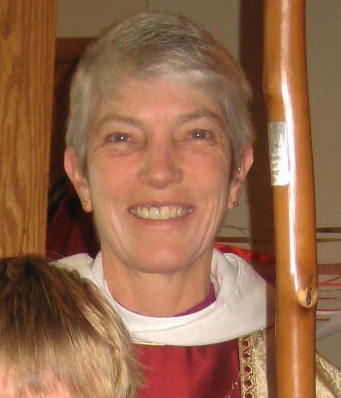
- Glasspool in 2011
- Church: Episcopal Church
- Diocese: Massachusetts
- Appointed: February 1, 2026
- Installed: 2026
- Previous posts: Suffragan Bishop of Los Angeles (2010–2016); Assistant Bishop of New York (2016-2025)

Orders
- Ordination: March 1982 (priest) by Lyman Ogilby
- Consecration: May 15, 2010 by Katharine Jefferts Schori

Personal details
- Born: February 23, 1954 (age 72) New York City, New York, US
- Denomination: Anglican
- Parents: Douglas Murray Glasspool & Anne Dickinson
- Spouse: Becki Sander
- Education: Dickinson College; Episcopal Divinity School

Mary Douglas Glasspool (born February 23, 1954) is an American bishop in the Episcopal Church. She served as assistant bishop in the Diocese of New York from 2016 to 2025, having previously been suffragan bishop of the Diocese of Los Angeles since 2010. She was the first openly lesbian woman to become a bishop in the Anglican Communion.

== Early life and education ==
Glasspool was born in Staten Island, New York, to the Rev. Douglas Murray Glasspool, rector of All Saints Church and St. Simon’s Church, and Anne Dickinson. She later moved to Goshen, New York, where her father served as rector of St. James' Church for 35 years until his death in 1989.

She graduated from Dickinson College in Carlisle, Pennsylvania, in 1976 and received a Master of Divinity degree from Episcopal Divinity School in Cambridge, Massachusetts, in 1981.

== Ordained ministry ==
Glasspool was ordained a deacon in June 1981 by the Rt. Rev. Paul Moore Jr., Bishop of New York, and a priest in March 1982 by the Rt. Rev. Lyman Ogilby, Bishop of Pennsylvania. From 1981 to 1984 she was the assistant to the rector at St. Paul’s Church in Chestnut Hill, Philadelphia, before serving as rector of St. Luke's and St. Margaret's Church in Boston, Massachusetts, from 1984 to 1992, then rector of St. Margaret's Church in Annapolis, Maryland, from 1992 to 2001. She was canon to the bishops for the Episcopal Diocese of Maryland from 2001 to 2009.

On December 4, 2009, Glasspool was elected as suffragan bishop of the Diocese of Los Angeles on the seventh ballot at the diocese's 115th convention in Riverside, California. On March 17, 2010, the office of the Presiding Bishop, Katharine Jefferts Schori, certified that her election had received the necessary consents, and on May 15, 2010, she was consecrated by Schori in Long Beach, California. She was the first openly lesbian woman to become a bishop in the Episcopal Church and the wider Anglican Communion, and only the 17th woman elected to as a bishop in the Episcopal Church. Her election gained worldwide attention in the context of the ongoing debate about gay bishops in the Anglican church.

In 2016 Glasspool left the Diocese of Los Angeles following her election as assistant bishop of the Episcopal Diocese of New York. After nine years in the role, she retired in June 2025. Effective February 1, 2026, she was an assisting bishop in the Episcopal Diocese of Massachusetts.

== Personal life ==
Glasspool is married to Becki Sander, with whom she has been in a relationship since the late 1980s.
