= St. Luke's and St. Margaret's Church =

- U.S. National Register of Historic Places
- U.S. Historic district
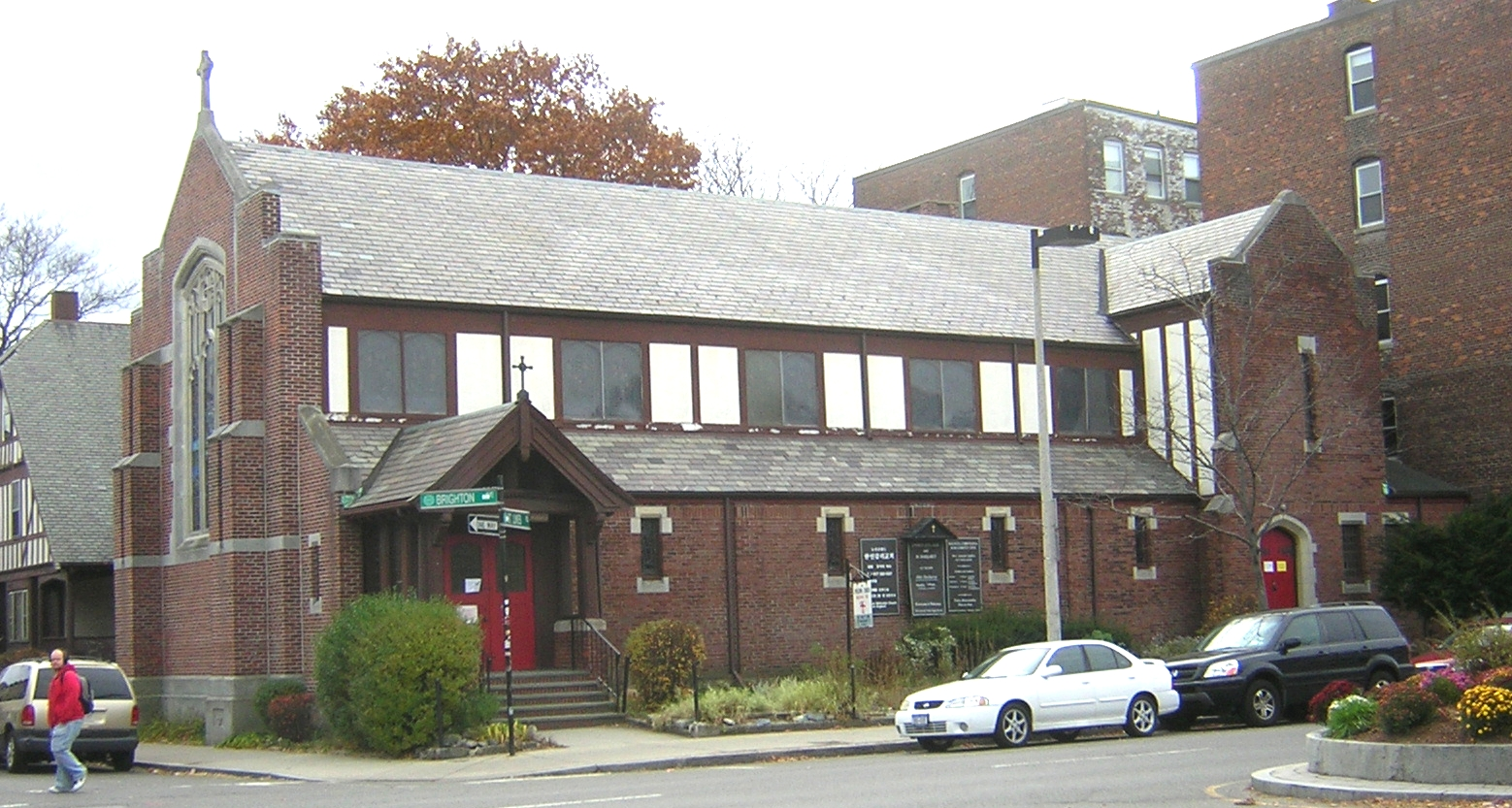

- Location within Massachusetts Location within the United States
- Location: 5-7 St. Luke's Rd., Boston, Massachusetts
- Coordinates: 42°21′7.8″N 71°7′37.7″W
- Area: less than one acre
- Built: 1895
- Architect: Francis R. Allen; Berry & Davidson
- Architectural style: Tudor Revival
- NRHP reference No.: 97001472
- Added to NRHP: November 12, 1997

St. Luke's and St. Margaret's Church is a former parish of the Episcopal Diocese of Massachusetts in the Allston neighborhood of Boston. It was closed in 2010.

== History ==
The parish was the merger of two separate churches. St. Margaret's (dedicated to Margaret of Antioch) was founded in 1862 in the nearby neighborhood of Brighton Center, which was then an independent town. The founders were associated with Church of the Advent in Boston, and St Margaret's was similarly Anglo-Catholic in practice and worship.

St. Luke's was founded in 1892, in Allston, which was then a rapidly growing white-collar neighborhood. It was the only parish in the diocese founded under Bishop Phillips Brooks, the famous preacher and author of O Little Town of Bethlehem. An initial church building was built in 1895, at the corner or Brighton Avenue and St. Luke's Road. A rectory next door was later added. A larger church building was built adjacent in 1915, and the old sanctuary was converted to a parish hall. St. Luke's was broadly low church in worship.

In the 1950s and 60s, as former members moved further out of Boston, attendance at both churches declined, and in 1967 the two parishes merged. They consolidated at the St. Luke's location, and the St. Margaret's buildings were sold. The combined parish continued to struggle, but it enjoyed a resurgence of attendance and activity in the 1980s and 1990s, beginning under the rectorship of Mary Glasspool (who would later become the first open lesbian bishop in the Anglican Communion).

In the 2000s, though, membership again dwindled, and the congregation was reduced from a full parish to a mission. In February 2010, the diocese announced that it was closing the mission, while retaining the property as a base for its "Micah Project", a residential internship program for young adults. The closing service was held on the feast of Pentecost, May 23, 2010. Among the celebrants were the last vicar and three former pastors, including Bishop Glasspool.

== Buildings ==
The buildings, located at 5-7 St. Luke's Road, comprise a sanctuary, parish hall and rectory. The parish hall and rectory are in the half-timber, "Tudorbethan" style. The sanctuary is in the style of an English country church, but in brick. The original chapel, which later became the upper parish hall, and the rectory were designed in 1895 by Francis R. Allen; the larger sanctuary was designed in 1913 by J. Lawrence Berry and Harry E. Davidson. Berry and Davidson had previously worked for Allen. Davidson was a member of the congregation, and Berry later rejoined Allen's successor firm of Allen & Collens as a partner. The assemblage was added to the National Register of Historic Places in 1997.

The church contains many fine stained-glass windows. A window depicting the Last Supper is done in an English glass style by the studio of George W. Spence of Boston and is set in the chancel over the altar reredos. A series in the clerestory depicting the life of Christ was designed and begun by the Charles J. Connick studio of Boston, and later completed by the Whittemore studio. Two aisle series, also by the Connick studio and completed by Whittemore, depict the Apostles and Prophets. Particularly notable is a large window on the east wall by the Tiffany studio of New York; the window depicts St John on the island of Patmos and was the first stained glass window in the parish, originally set in the south wall of the original chapel, then surrounded with additional glass upon its placement in the new church and restored in the 1990s.

== See also ==
- National Register of Historic Places listings in southern Boston, Massachusetts
