= Reformed Dutch Church of Poughkeepsie =

Historic church in New York, United States

- U.S. National Register of Historic Places
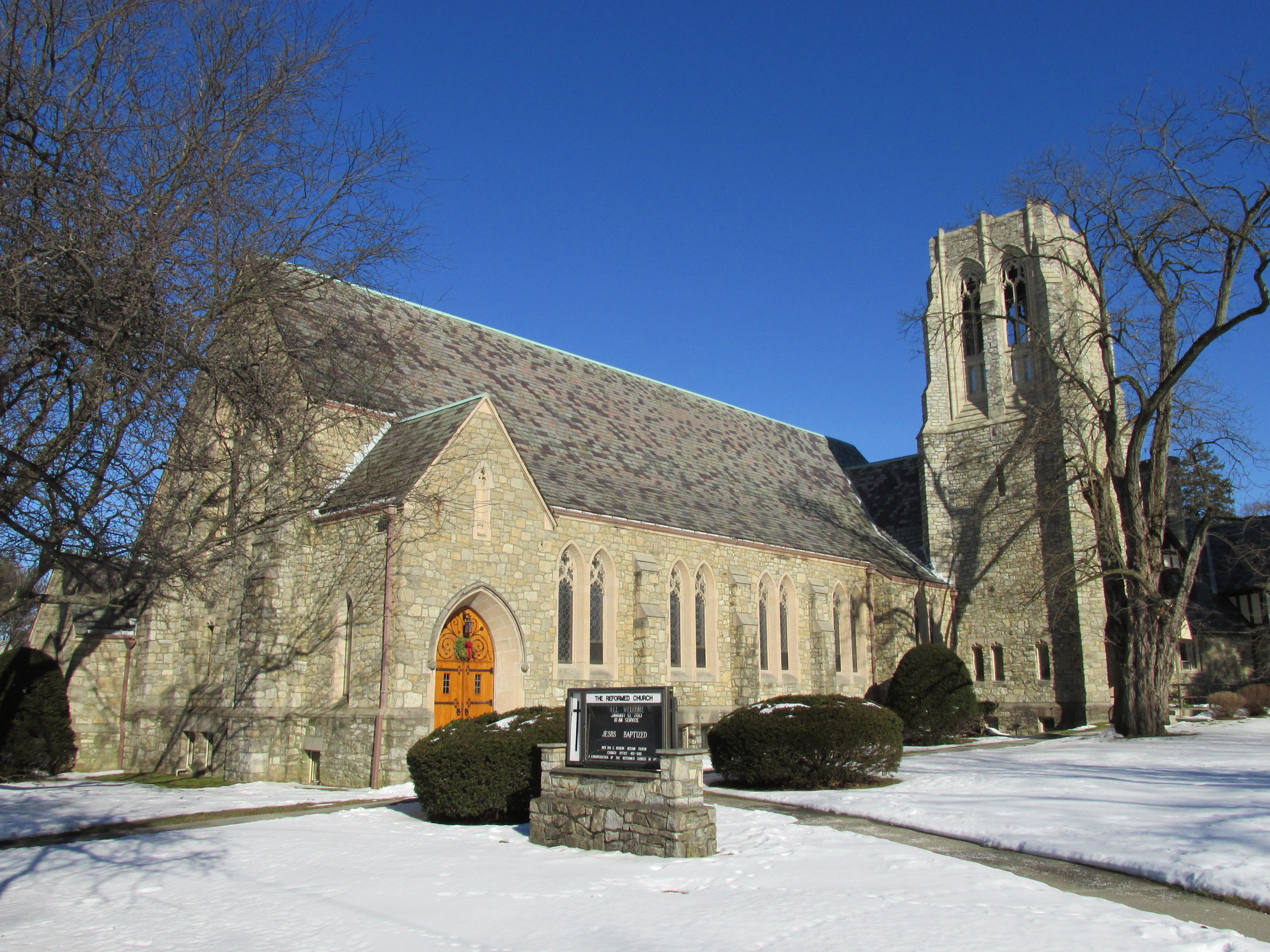
- The Reformed Church

- Location within New York Location within the United States
- Location: 70 Hooker Ave., Poughkeepsie, New York
- Coordinates: 41°41′42.64″N 73°55′17.68″W
- Area: 1 acre (0.40 ha)
- Built: 1921
- Architect: Collens, Charles
- Architectural style: Late Gothic Revival
- NRHP reference No.: 08000099
- Added to NRHP: February 28, 2008

Reformed Dutch Church of Poughkeepsie is a historic church at 70 Hooker Avenue in Poughkeepsie, New York.

The original congregation was formed in 1716. The building was constructed in 1921 and added to the National Register of Historic Places in 2008.

It was designed by Charles Collens.
