= Webster Memorial Building =

Historic house in Connecticut, United States

- U.S. National Register of Historic Places
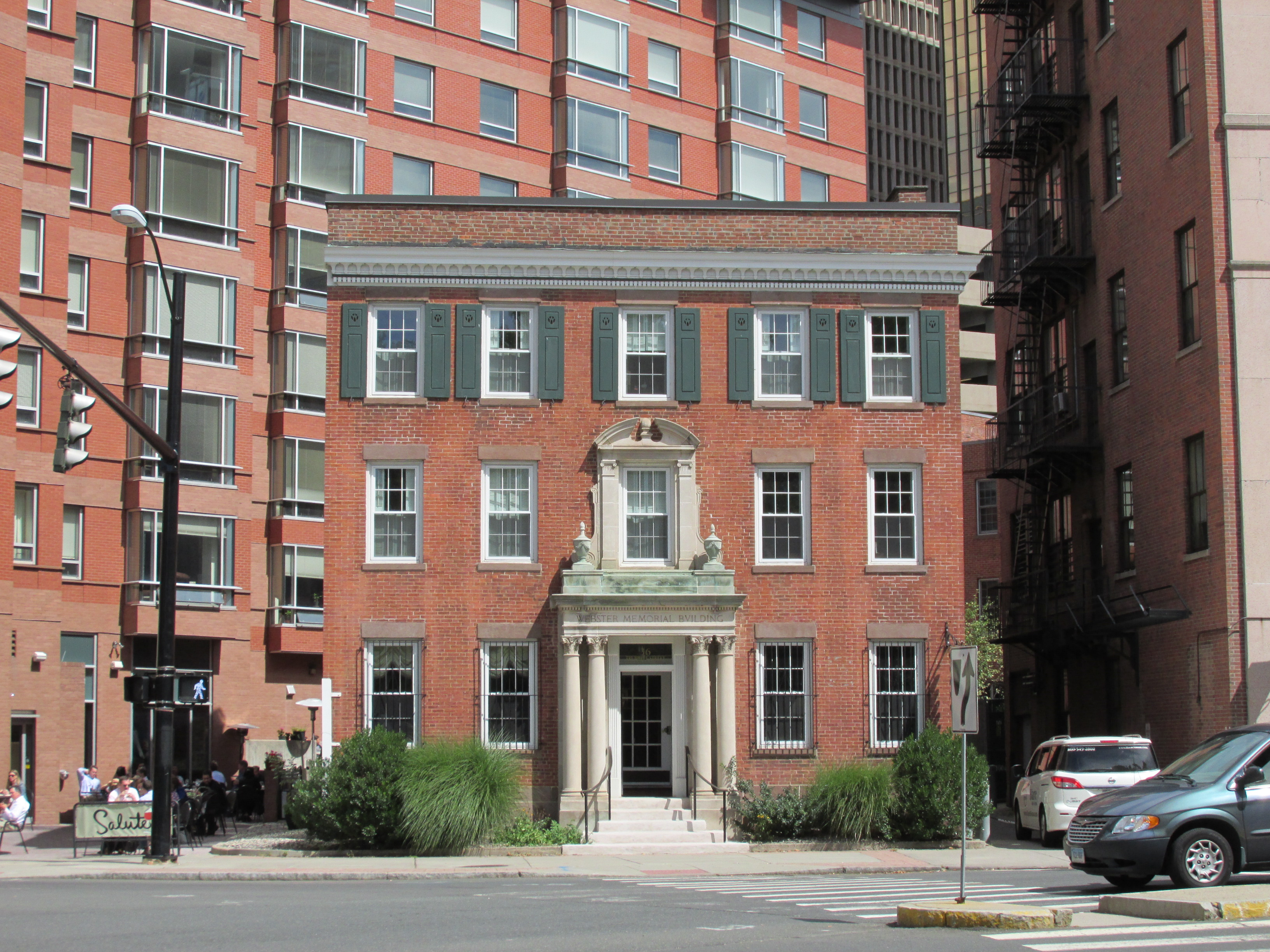

- Location within Connecticut Location within the United States
- Location: 36 Trumbull Street, Hartford, Connecticut
- Coordinates: 41°45′55″N 72°40′35″W
- Area: less than one acre
- Built: 1870
- Architect: Lewis & Rowell; Et al.
- Architectural style: Neo-Georgian
- NRHP reference No.: 82004433
- Added to NRHP: April 12, 1982

The Webster Memorial Building is a historic house at 36 Trumbull Street in Downtown Hartford, Connecticut. Built in 1870 and extensively restyled in 1924, it is a rare example of Georgian Revival architecture in the downtown area, noted for its historical association with the Family Services Society, a prominent local charity. The building, now in other commercial use, was listed on the National Register of Historic Places in 1982.

== Description and history ==
The Webster Memorial Building is situated at the Northeast Corner of Trumbull and Jewell Streets on the West Side of Hartford's Downtown area, facing one of the main entrances to Bushnell Park. It is a three-story brick structure with a flat roof and a decorative wooden carved cornice. The main facade spans five bays, with most windows set in rectangular openings featuring brownstone sills and lintels. The main entrance is recessed within the central bay and is framed by a projecting portico supported by paired Corinthian columns. These columns uphold a frieze bearing the building's name, above which rests a cornice and a step adorned with a pair of urns. The bay above the entrance showcases a window flanked by pilasters and crowned by a broken segmented-arch pediment.

The building was originally constructed in 1870 as a private three-unit apartment house, designed in the then-popular Italianate style, featuring a bracketed cornice. In 1925, it was acquired by the Charity Organization Society, a philanthropic organization established in 1890. The purchase was made possible by a bequest from John Webster, a local insurance executive. The society decided to remodel the building for its own use and enlisted the Boston firm of Allen & Collens, renowned for their work on the Hartford Theological Seminary, to oversee the project. It is to Allen & Collens that the building owes its present exterior appearance. Renamed the Family Services Society, the organization has been at the forefront of social service endeavors in collaboration with other local charities since its inception.

== See also ==
- National Register of Historic Places listings in Hartford, Connecticut
