= Knox United Church (Calgary) =

Church in Alberta, Canada

Coordinates: 51.0478°N 114.0707°W

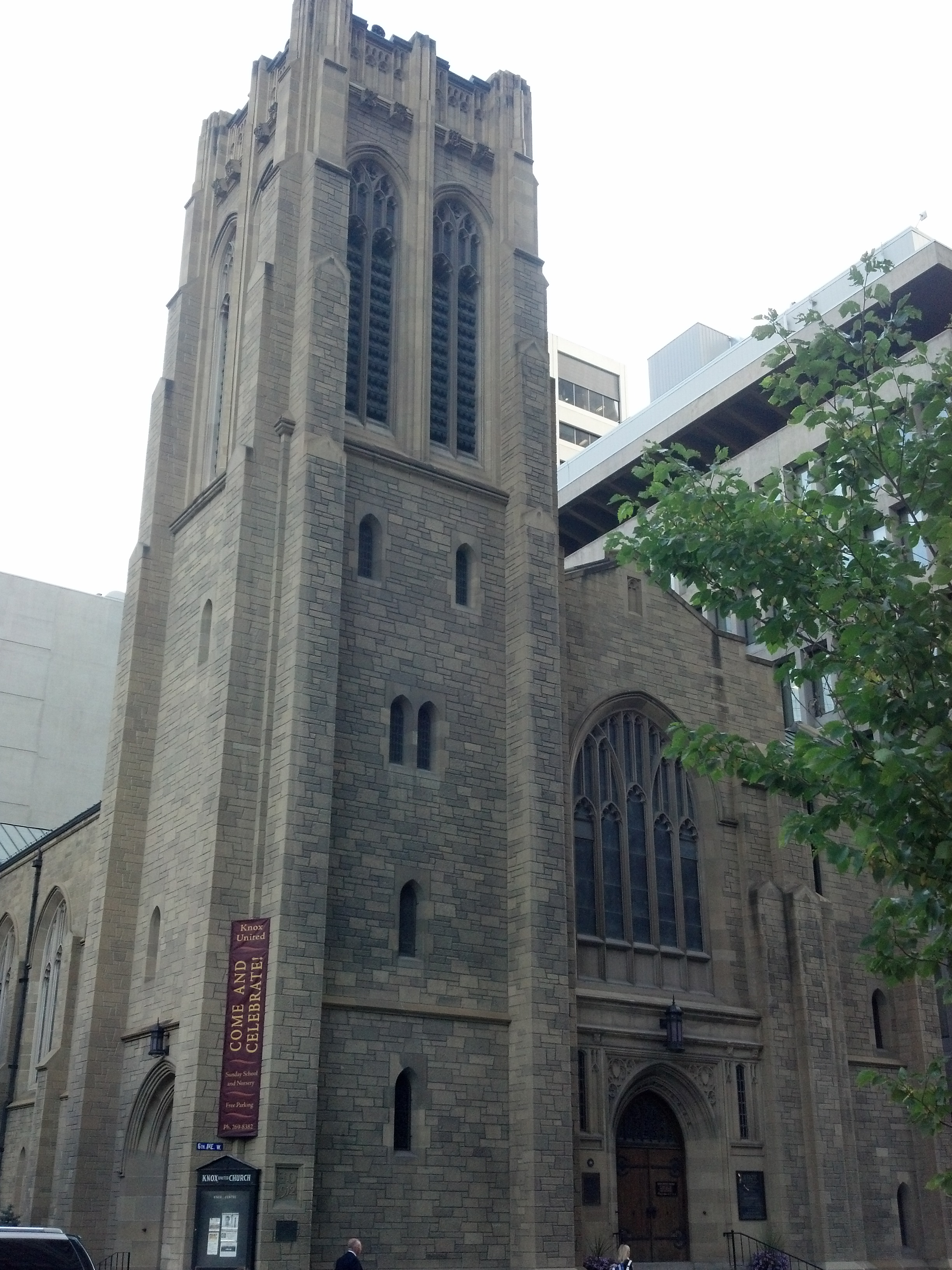
The church in 2012

Knox United Church is a Gothic Revival church located in Calgary, Alberta, Canada and is a member church of the United Church of Canada.

== History ==
Knox Presbyterian Church was established in 1883 Rev. James Robertson, Superintendent of the Western Mission for the Presbyterian Church in 1881. Their first church building was opened on October 21, 1883, a small wooden building. It was completed for $1000.

A new, larger, building was constructed at the corner of Centre Street and Seventh Avenue. Designed to seat 330 people it was a stone construction which cost $8,000. As the congregation continued to expand, a subsequent building was erected in 1912–13 at the corner of Fourth Street and Sixth Avenue South, the site of the present day Knox United Church. The church building was designed by Calgary architects Lawson & Fordyce in consultation with Allen & Collens of Boston. The building is one of the most sophisticated examples of Gothic Revival architecture in western Canada.

The church split in 1925 after some members of the congregation voted to join with the United Church of Canada. Those who wished to remain in the Presbyterian Church went on to form a new, separate congregation.

== Current ministry ==
The church has been at front of the movement to welcome gays, lesbians and transgender individuals into the United Church. In March 2007, after a vote at its annual congregational meeting, Knox became an affirming congregation, committed to work for the full inclusion and affirmation of all people in the life and work of the church.

The church has one of the largest Casavant Frères organs in western Canada. This forms the centre of a strong music program. A permanent labyrinth was opened in 2005 and is open for daily meditations. The building is now also well known throughout the area as a venue for musical concerts of all kinds and is working to become more involved in the arts community in Calgary.
