= First Parish Church (Waltham, Massachusetts) =

Historic church in Massachusetts, United States

- U.S. National Register of Historic Places
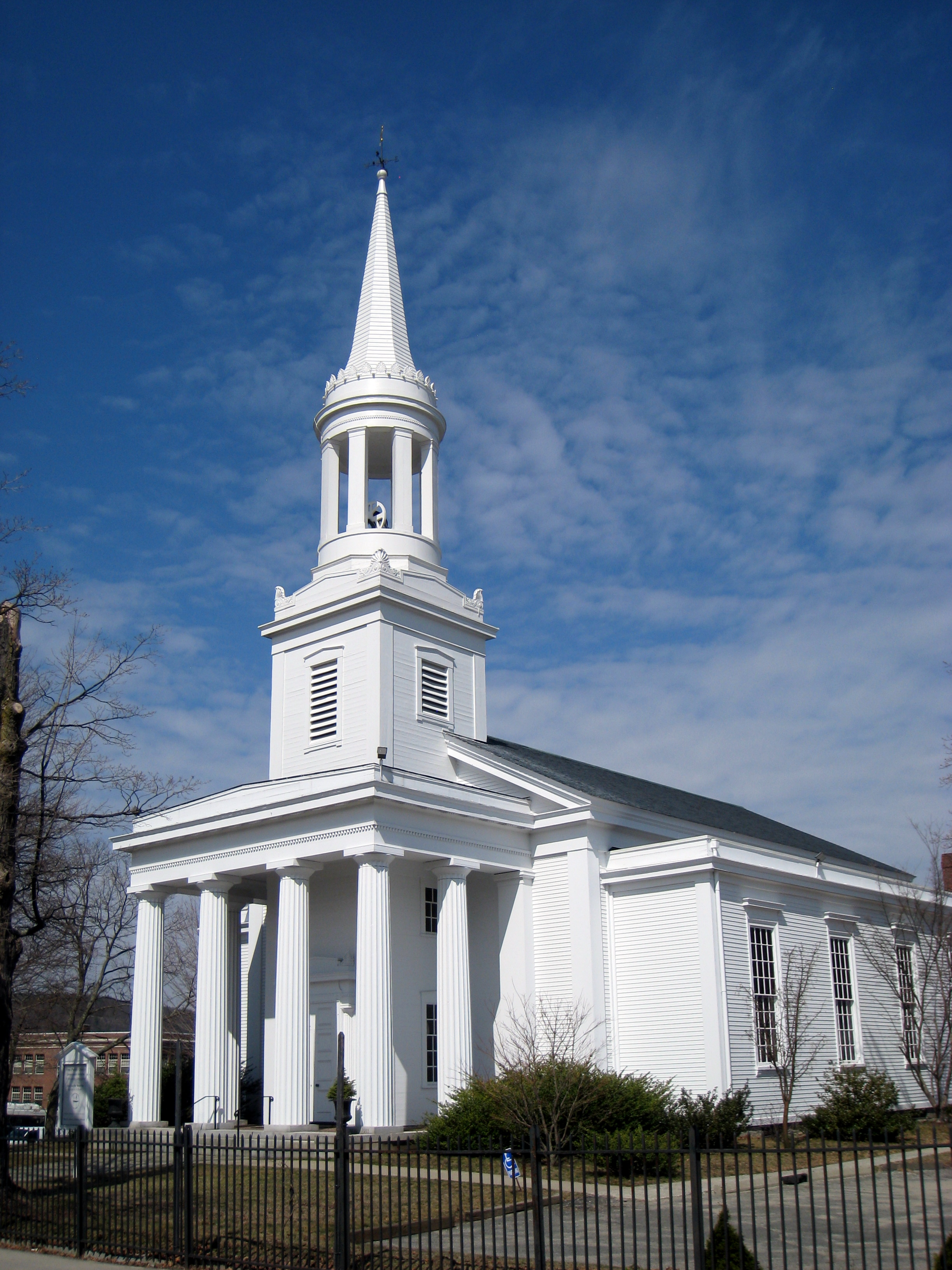
- First Parish Church

- Location within Massachusetts Location within the United States
- Location: Waltham, Massachusetts
- Coordinates: 42°22′42″N 71°14′7″W
- Built: 1932
- Architect: Allen & Collens
- Architectural style: Classical Revival
- MPS: Waltham MRA
- NRHP reference No.: 89001507
- Added to NRHP: September 28, 1989

The First Parish Church is a historic church at 50 Church Street in Waltham, Massachusetts, whose Unitarian Universalist congregation has a history dating to c. 1696. The current meeting house was built in 1933 after a fire destroyed the previous building (the congregation's third) on the same site. It is a Classical Revival structure designed by the nationally known Boston firm of Allen & Collens. The church building was listed on the National Register of Historic Places in 1989.

== Architecture and history ==
The church is located at the northwest corner of School and Church Streets, one block north of Waltham's Central Square. It is a rectangular single-story structure, with a gable-roofed central section four bays wide that is flanked by flat-roof single-bay sections. A Classical Revival portico with fluted columns projects at the south-facing front facade, with the church tower set astride the transition between the projection and the main body. A school structure, added in 1957, is attached to the rear of the building.

The First Parish congregation dates to about 1695, when the area was part of Watertown, and had grown sufficiently in population to merit a separate parish from the original 1630 congregation in Watertown. In 1720 the congregation acquired its first meetinghouse, moving a building from what is now Newton. Its second meetinghouse, located at Lyman and Beaver Streets, was built in 1767, and its third was built at this location in 1838. That building was destroyed by fire on August 24, 1932. The present church was built, partly on the foundations of the previous one, soon afterward. It was designed by the noted ecclesiastical architectural firm of Allen & Collens of Boston.

== See also ==
- National Register of Historic Places listings in Waltham, Massachusetts
