= Louise Hall (academic) =

- Born: 1905; Cambridge, Massachusetts
- Died: 1990 (aged 84–85)
- Education: Wellesley College (1927), Massachusetts Institute of Technology (1930), Radcliffe College (1954)
- Occupation: Architect
- Projects: Established curriculum in art, including the development of collections and planning for a museum at Duke University

Louise Hall (1905–1990) was a professor of art and architecture at Duke University from 1931 to 1975. Hall was responsible for much of the early growth of the Duke University Department of Fine Arts (presently, Department of Art, Art History & Visual Studies). She was a member of the North Carolina Chapter of the American Institute of Architects.

== Biography ==
Hall was born in 1905, in Cambridge, Massachusetts. She earned a B.A. from Wellesley College, a B.S. from Massachusetts Institute of Technology, and a PhD from Radcliffe College, which later integrated into now Harvard University. In addition, she was a registered architect who had studied at the Sorbonne. In 1931, she received a Brevet d'Art, from the University of Paris. Hired in 1931, she was the first person to work in Harvard's arts program, and established much of the curriculum. Hall also was responsible for purchasing all materials necessary for the program, developing the collection, and establishing a museum. By 1934, eleven courses in arts were offered.

In addition, she worked for the United States Coast and Geodetic Survey during World War II. Hall was the sole representative of the Duke University at archeological digs in Winchester, England from 1964 to 1971. She was a longtime member of the American Institute of Architects.

== Legacy ==
Hall died in 1990. Her papers, drawings, and original artworks were collected at International Archives of Women in Architecture, Virginia Tech, and University Archives, Duke University Libraries.
