= Davison House =

Vassar College dormitory

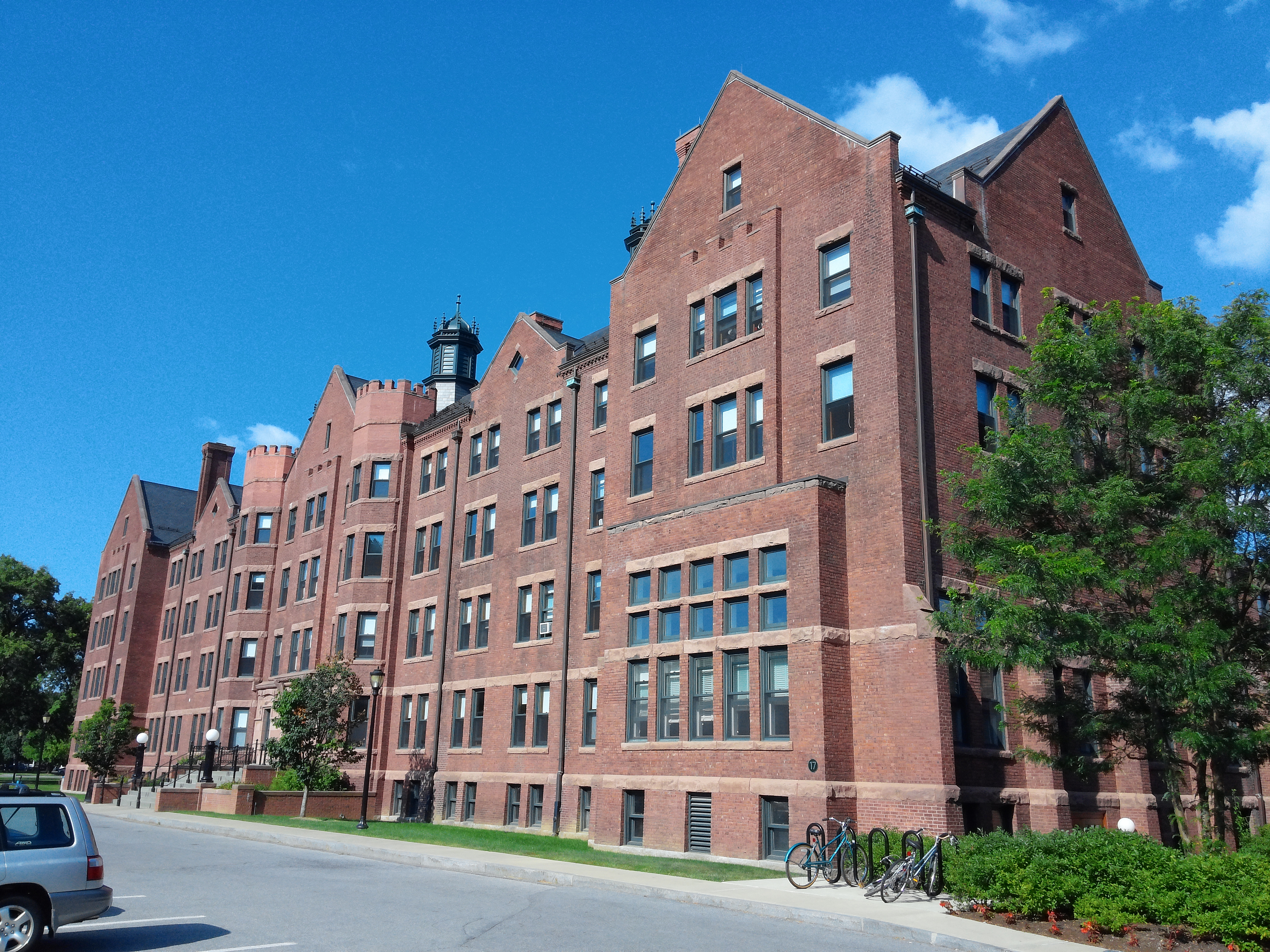
- Davison viewed from the southwest in 2014
- Interactive map of the Davison House area
- Alternative names: Eliza Davison House

General information
- Type: Dormitory
- Architectural style: Elizabethan
- Location: Poughkeepsie, New York
- Coordinates: 41.6893108°N 73.8975587°W
- Current tenants: Vassar College
- Completed: 1902
- Owner: Vassar College

Technical details
- Material: Brick
- Floor count: 5

Design and construction
- Architecture firm: Allen & Vance

Davison House (officially the Eliza Davison House) is a five-story dormitory on the campus of Vassar College in the town of Poughkeepsie, New York. Designed by Boston architecture firm Allen & Vance and built 1902, it was the fourth dorm built on Vassar's residential quadrangle. It houses 191 students of any grade or gender and it became Vassar's first disabled-accessible dorm following a 2008–2009 renovation.

== History ==
Davison House was the fourth residential quadrangle (quad) dormitory to be built on the campus Vassar College in the town of Poughkeepsie, New York. Construction of Davison came during a period of rapid dorm-building spanning 1893–1902 during which the older seminary-style model of housing—a single large hall in which all a college's residents lived, in Vassar's case Main Building—was quickly waning in popularity in favor of smaller individual houses. The project began with the opening of Strong House in 1893 and continued with Raymond House in 1897, Lathrop House in 1901, and finally Davison in 1902.

Davison House was built with funds provided by magnate and philanthropist John D. Rockefeller, then a trustee at the college. Named in honor of his mother as the Eliza Davison House, it was the third structure at Vassar that Rockefeller paid for, after Strong House and Rockefeller Hall.

Roofers replaced Davison's roof in 1960 and new windows were installed in 1980. A new staircase on the side of the dorm facing away from the quad was built in 2005. The dorm underwent a major renovation during the 2008–2009 school year, reopening at the beginning of the 2009–2010 academic year. The renovation included plans for upgraded accessibility, including an elevator and disabled-accessible bathrooms and doors, making it Vassar's first dorm to offer those features.

== Architecture and features ==
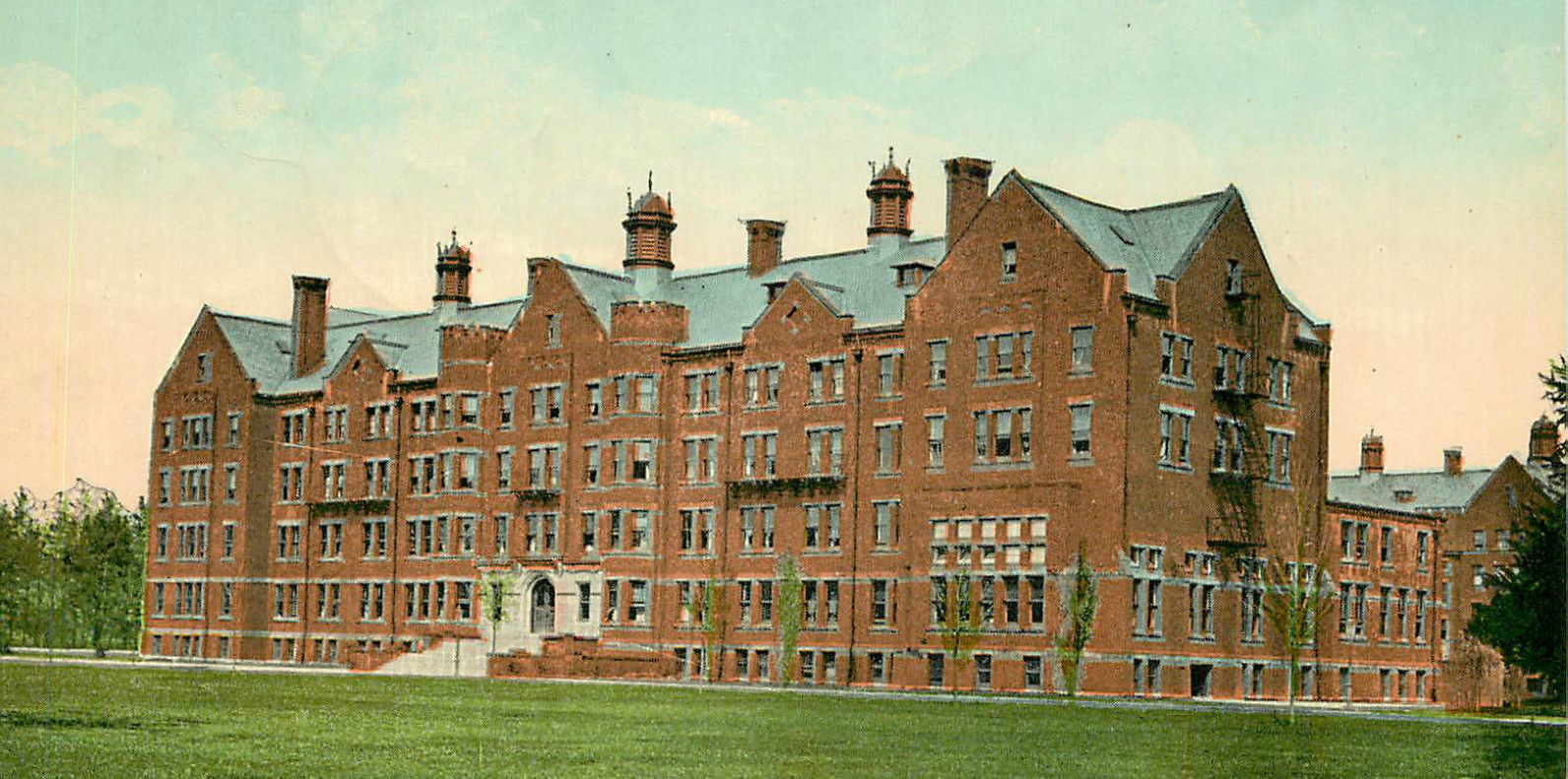
Davison c. 1911 from the west

Davison was designed by the Boston architectural firm of Francis Richmond Allen and J. McArthur Vance who were also responsible for the design of its neighbor, Lathrop House, in 1901. Formulating a design for these two buildings was not difficult as a template had already been set by way of the preexisting Strong and Raymond Houses. Frederick Law Olmsted, a consultant of design for the college, recommended that any new dorms in the area be built in an "echelon formation" in order to provide for a greater sense of openness. Allen disregarded this advice, instead opting to place the dorm, along with Lathrop, in "two long unbroken rows of buildings on the bias". Davison was ultimately placed north of Raymond, across the quad to the west of Lathrop, and diagonally across from Strong.

Standing a total of five stories tall with an additional basement level, Davison is an Elizabethan brick building. It is capped with a pitched Pennsylvania slate roof and five chimneys, each multiple wythes thick. Several cupolas also jut from the roof, each fitted with louvers. The dorm features elements of brownstone trim and brownstone-capped brick parapets. Inside the building, dorm room floors are made of wood paneling. Walls are painted cream and fifth-floor rooms feature sloped ceilings and inlaid skylights. Bathrooms have tile floors and marble sinks, while communal spaces utilize motion-sensing lighting technology.

The house is co-ed and currently has a capacity of 191 students. Residents of Davison, which houses students of all grades, may live in either single rooms, one-room doubles, or three-room triples with bathrooms being shared by all members of a hall. The dorm has a kitchen, a parlor abutting the quad, and, as of 2011, its basement was a frequent practice space for student bands. In a 2005 guide to the school published by College Prowler, Davison was named one of the three best dorms at Vassar, along with Main and Jewett.
