= Jewett House =

Dormitory of Vassar College

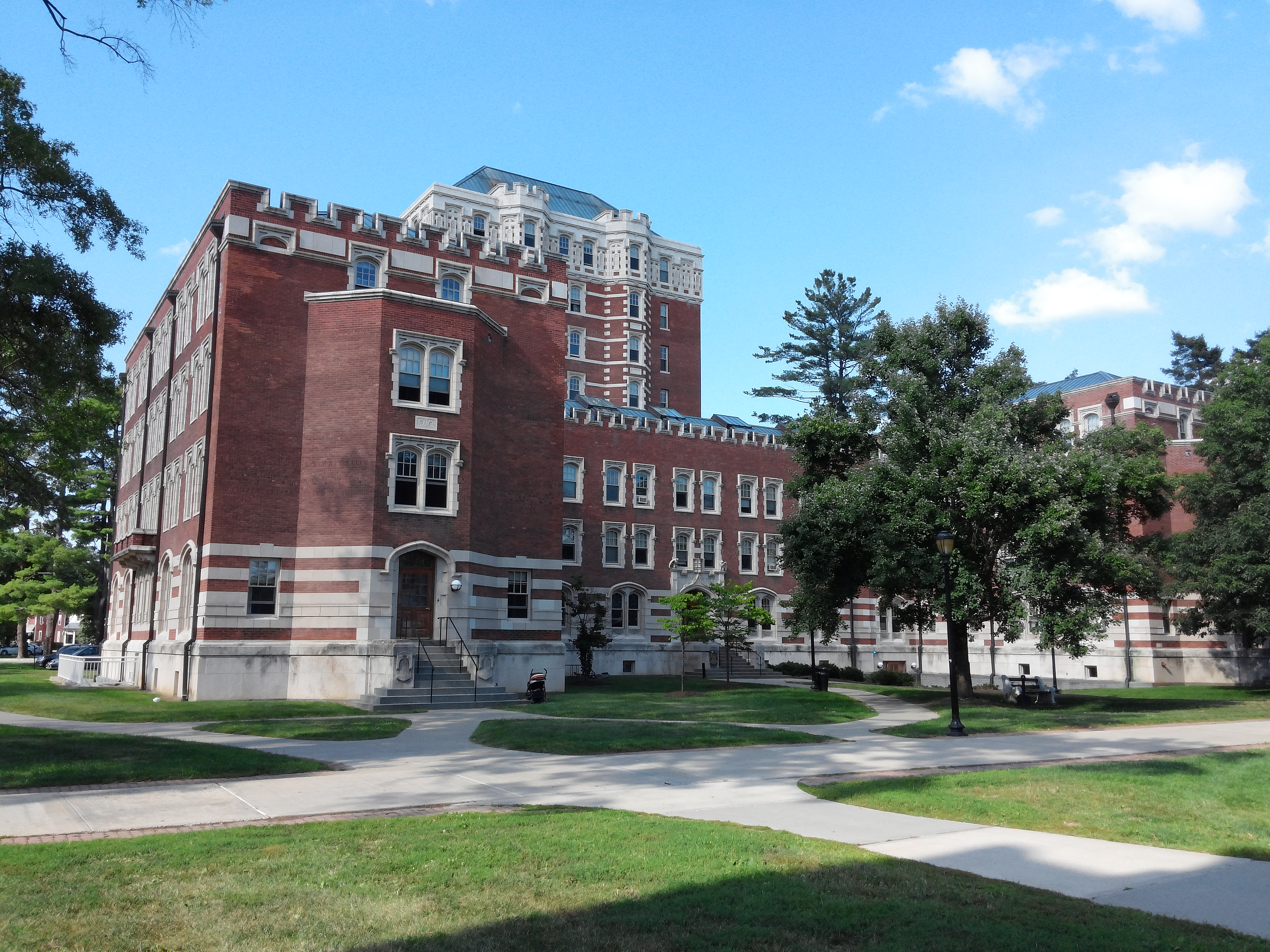
- Jewett viewed from the southwest in 2014
- Interactive map of the Jewett House area
- Alternative names: Milo Jewett House, North Hall, Pilcher's Crime

General information
- Type: Dormitory
- Architectural style: Tudor
- Location: Poughkeepsie, New York, US
- Coordinates: 41.690140°N 73.897089°W
- Current tenants: Vassar College
- Named for: Milo P. Jewett
- Completed: 1907
- Renovated: 2002–2003
- Cost: $212,500
- Renovation cost: $21 million
- Owner: Vassar College

Technical details
- Material: Brick, stone
- Floor count: 9

Design and construction
- Architect: Lewis Pilcher
- Architecture firm: Pilcher and Tachau

Renovating team
- Renovating firm: Herbert S. Newman & Partners

Jewett House (formally Milo Jewett House and formerly North Hall) is a nine-story Tudor-style dormitory on the campus of Vassar College in the town of Poughkeepsie, New York. Built in 1907 to accommodate increasing demand for residential space, the dorm was designed by Vassar art professor Lewis Pilcher of the architectural firm Pilcher and Tachau. Early reviews looked unfavorably upon Jewett, even dubbing it "Pilcher's Crime" and by 2002, a host of issues plagued the dorm, leading to a $21 million renovation. Up to 195 students of any gender or class year may live in Jewett. The dorm has been purported to be haunted by several different ghosts during its existence.

== History ==
In 1902, Vassar College in the town of Poughkeepsie, New York, completed Davison House, the fourth dorm in the college's residential quadrangle (quad). Enrollment was limited to 1,000 students by 1905 and the college saw a need to further expand the number of dorms available so it approved the creation of a new one. Totaling $212,500, construction was paid for using college funds (versus the donor funds that paid for Strong and Davison Houses).

The dormitory was known as North Hall upon its opening. However, by 1915, the college's semicentennial, no donor had stepped forward to help fund the dormitory's construction and Vassar president Henry Noble MacCracken renamed the building Milo Jewett House after Milo P. Jewett. Jewett served as Vassar's first president from his election to the office in February 1861 until his departure from the college in spring 1864 after a dispute with the school's founder and namesake, Matthew Vassar. Although Jewett was instrumental in providing a vision for the college, the school did not open until 1865, meaning he never had the chance to oversee its student body.

By 2002, Jewett hosted a spectrum of problems, highlighted in Vassar's alumnae/i magazine as including

an elevator that simply does not stop at the second floor; balconies you can never reach; a mezzanine-level bathroom for residents of the third-floor tower area, complete with stalls so squeezed that those of all heights bruise their kneecaps when they sit to use the facilities; and a stairway tightly wrapped around a nine-story elevator shaft that no longer comes close to meeting fire safety codes.

The college developed a master plan in 2000 to improve campus residences and Jewett was elected as the first to undergo renovation. New Haven, Connecticut-based Herbert S. Newman & Partners were selected for the 15-month project which was completed by October 2003 at a cost of $21 million.

== Architecture and features ==
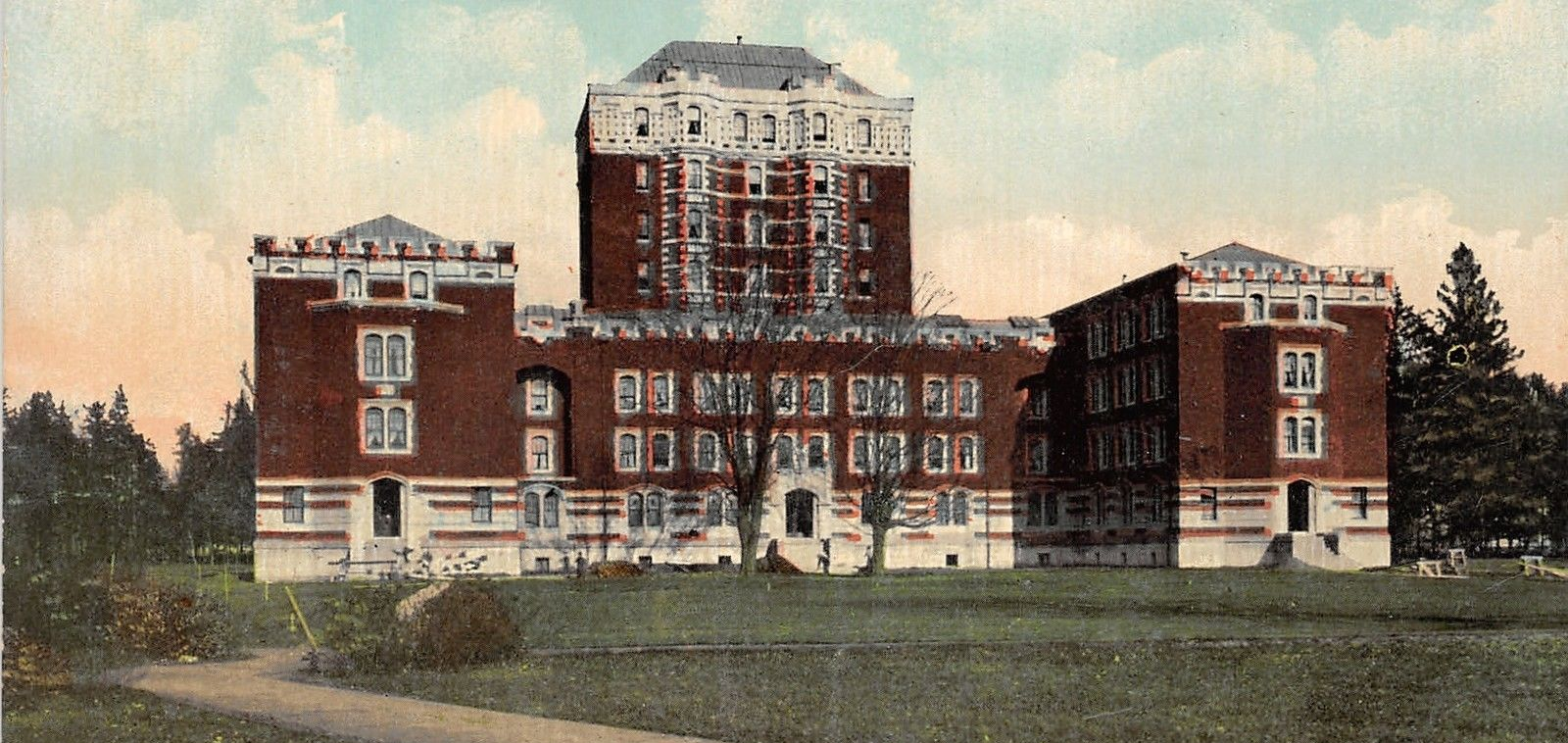
A postcard of North Hall c. 1912

Lewis Pilcher of the architectural firm Pilcher and Tachau served as an art professor at Vassar between 1900 and 1911; his firm was responsible for the design of the house. Jewett was built at the north end of the residential quad, northwest of Lathrop House and northeast of Davison House. Later projects saw the erection of Josselyn House (1912) to Jewett's west and the Students' Building (1913) to its east. It is the only building on the quad, including Rockefeller Hall, with its main facade facing inward.

The dormitory, constructed from brick and stone, consists of a four-story U-shaped main body with a nine-story tower built ostensibly "to help campus water pressure." Construction on the house wrapped up in 1907. Historian Elizabeth A. Daniels notes that while Jewett's design is "generally Tudor in spirit", it contrasts with the rest of the dorms on the quad which are Elizabethan in style. Wooden structural support elements are minimal in the house, with the dormitory instead relying on steel and concrete. Instead of using stone for decorative exterior elements including trim and faces, as was common at the time of construction, Pilcher utilized terracotta. Other external features include a pitched copper roof with a low slope, limestone-surrounded entrances, crenellations, and light red brick. According to architectural writers Karen Van Lengen and Lisa Reilly, the tower's presence "created a more monumental and less homelike impression than that of its neighbor, Josselyn" which they speculate may have earned the dorm its nickname, "Pilcher's Crime".

Upon opening, the house featured two dining rooms with student rooms arranged along lengthy hallways radiating from the center of the structure. The nine tower floors were only accessible via the ground level, from the dorm's primary entrance hall. An exterior fire escape led down the back of Jewett's tower but was replaced with an interior stairwell during the 2003 renovation.

Jewett is co-ed with a capacity of 195 residents. Students of any grade may live in the house, in either single rooms, one-room doubles, one-room triples, two-room doubles, or suites. A college guide compiled in 2003 by the staff of the Yale Daily News identified the dorm as one of the two most popular at the college, along with Cushing House.

Jewett is allegedly the site of numerous hauntings. An apartment in the dorm's east arm has been purported to be haunted by a Panama suit-clad "gentleman ghost" while claims of a wailing baby's ghost in a disused bathtub in the building have recurred throughout its history.
