= Raymond House (Vassar College) =

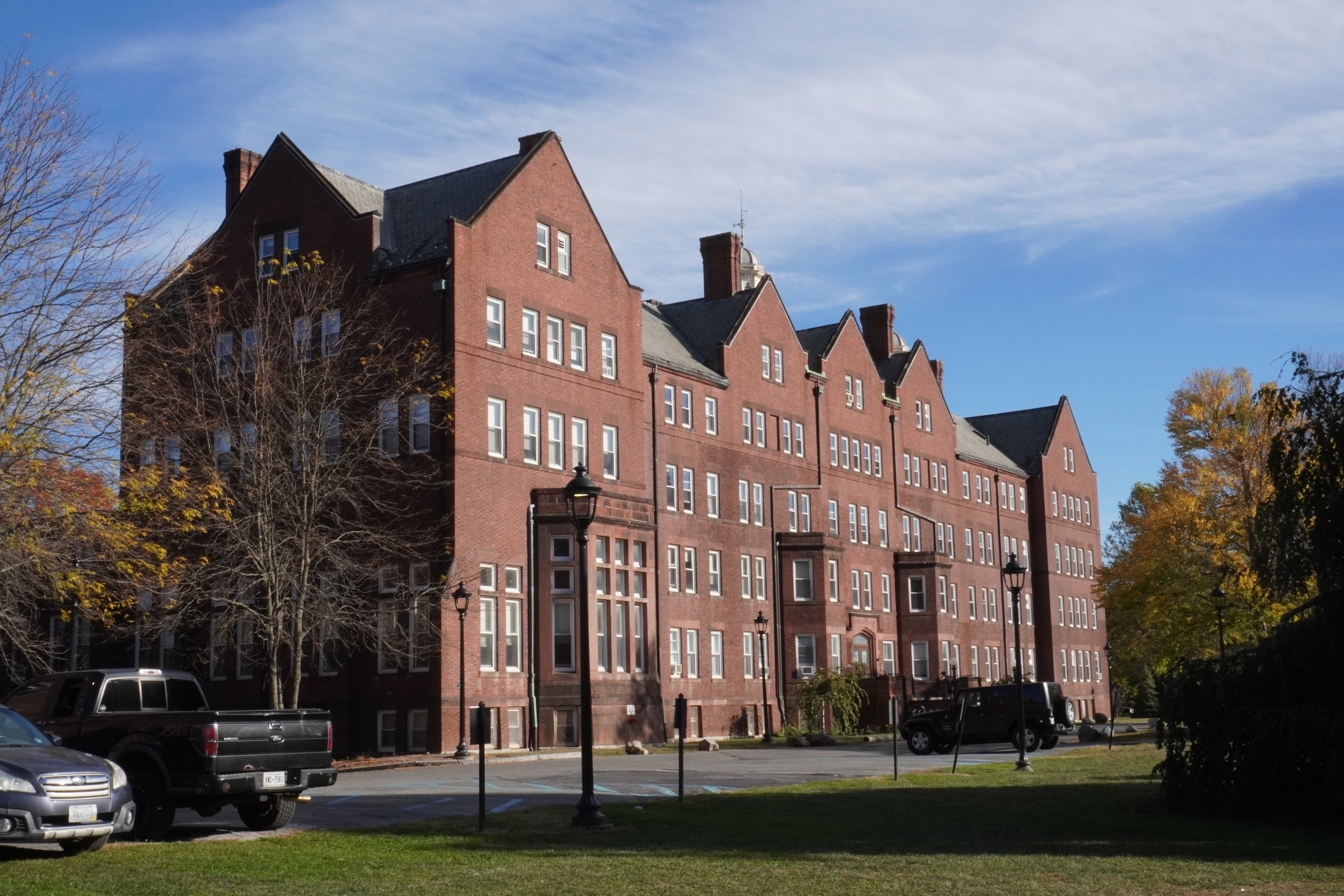
- Raymond pictured in 2024
- Interactive map of the Raymond House area

General information
- Type: Dormitory
- Location: Poughkeepsie, New York, United States
- Coordinates: 41.6885°N 73.8975°W
- Current tenants: Vassar College
- Completed: 1897
- Owner: Vassar College

Technical details
- Floor count: 5

Design and construction
- Architect: Francis R. Allen

Raymond House is one of five quadrangle residence halls at Vassar College, located in the town of Poughkeepsie, New York. Designed by Francis R. Allen, Raymond House was erected in 1897 in response to the popularity of Strong House and named after the second president of Vassar College, John Howard Raymond. The dormitory has five floors and is one of the residence halls that was paid for by the college in entirety.

== History ==
Due to the immense success of Strong House, built just four years prior, Raymond House was erected in 1897. The dormitory was built at the same time as the nearby Rockefeller Hall. Unlike Strong and Davison Houses, which were funded by money donated to the college by trustee John D. Rockefeller, Raymond was paid for completely by Vassar College. Raymond was the third dormitory built on campus and was named after Vassar's second president, John Howard Raymond. The first cooperative living plan that the college ever offered was in Raymond from its construction until the 1942–1943 academic year. A $115 deduction in annual bill was given to students living in Raymond in exchange for performing housekeeping duties throughout the year.

== Architecture and features ==
Designed by architect Francis R. Allen, Raymond House is the second of Vassar's five quadrangle dormitories. The red brick dormitory has five floors above ground, as well as a basement. There are two main entrances to the building, one on the east to the quadrangle, and one on the west to the road. The building's name, Raymond House, is inscribed over the dormitory's entrance. The staircase to the west entrance was entirely rebuilt in 2005. The roof of Raymond is made of green slate, and the building contains six chimneys; each with two wythes, or internal flues, of brick and with bluestone caps.

Raymond has a current capacity of 200 students.
