= Students' Building (Vassar College) =

College building in Poughkeepsie, New York

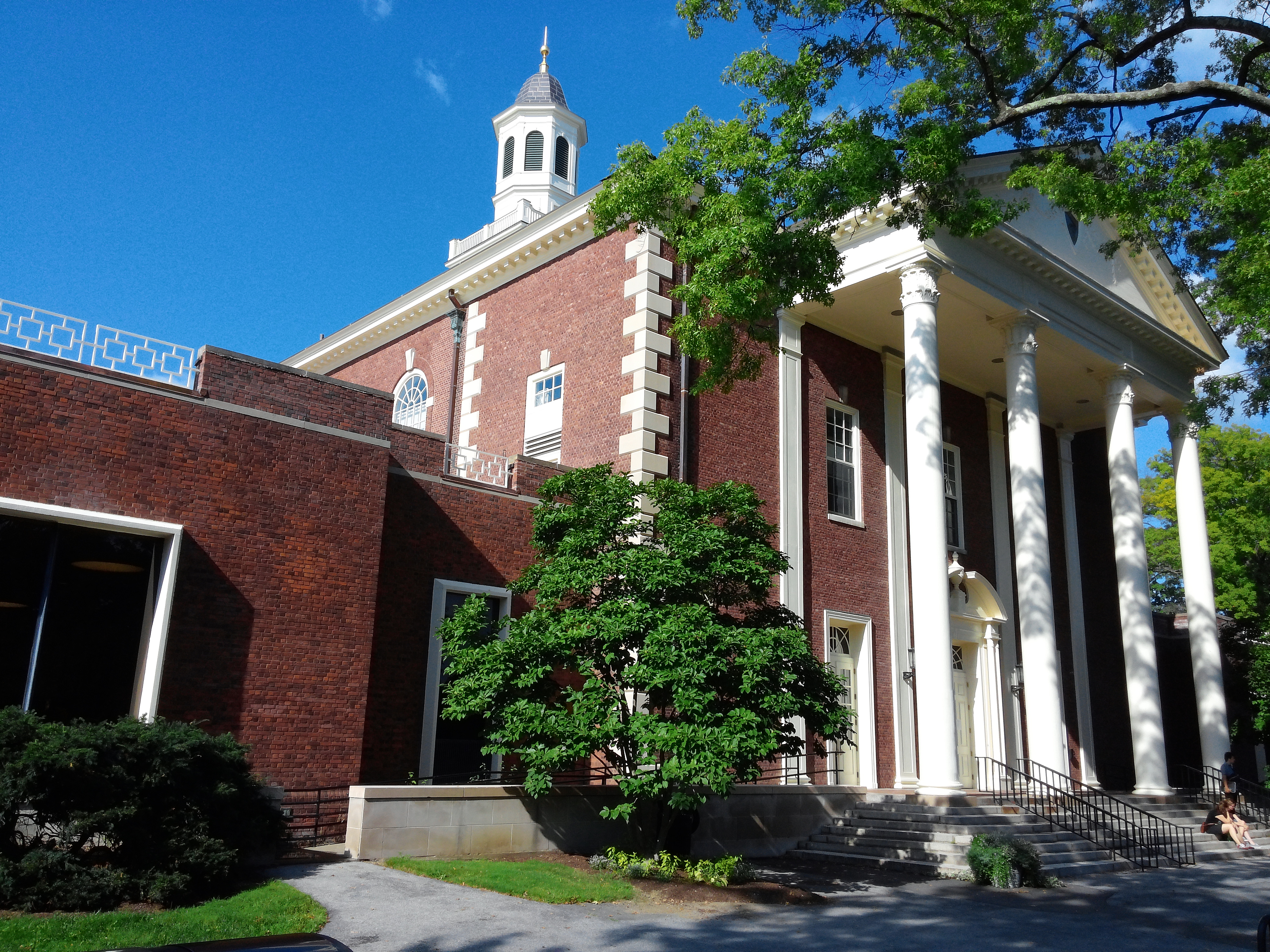
- The Students' Building in 2014
- Interactive map of the Students' Building area
- Alternative names: All Campus Dining Center, ACDC, Deece

General information
- Type: Student space, dining hall
- Architectural style: Southern colonial revival
- Location: Poughkeepsie, New York
- Coordinates: 41.690251°N 73.895491°W
- Current tenants: Vassar College
- Groundbreaking: September 25, 1912
- Completed: 1913
- Renovated: 1973, 2003
- Renovation cost: $3.5 million (1973); $11 million (2003); $8–9 million (2017)
- Owner: Vassar College

Technical details
- Material: Brick
- Floor count: 3

Design and construction
- Architect: Joseph Herenden Clark
- Architecture firm: McKim, Mead & White
- Main contractor: Bishop and Company

Renovating team
- Renovating firm: Walker O. Cain and Associates (1973); Finegold Alexander & Associates (2003); LTL Architects (2017)

The Students' Building on the campus of Vassar College in the town of Poughkeepsie, New York, U.S., houses the school's All Campus Dining Center (Note: Main to Mudd (1987) refers to the dining hall as the All College Dining Center.) (officially Gordon Commons and nicknamed the ACDC or Deece) as well as additional multifunctional student space on its second floor. Designed by Joseph Herenden Clark of McKim, Mead & White and built in 1913, the structure originally housed a variety of different student organizations and school functions. In 1973, it was converted into a campuswide dining hall; it underwent a second renovation in 2003 that returned multipurpose student functionalities to its upper floors.

== History ==
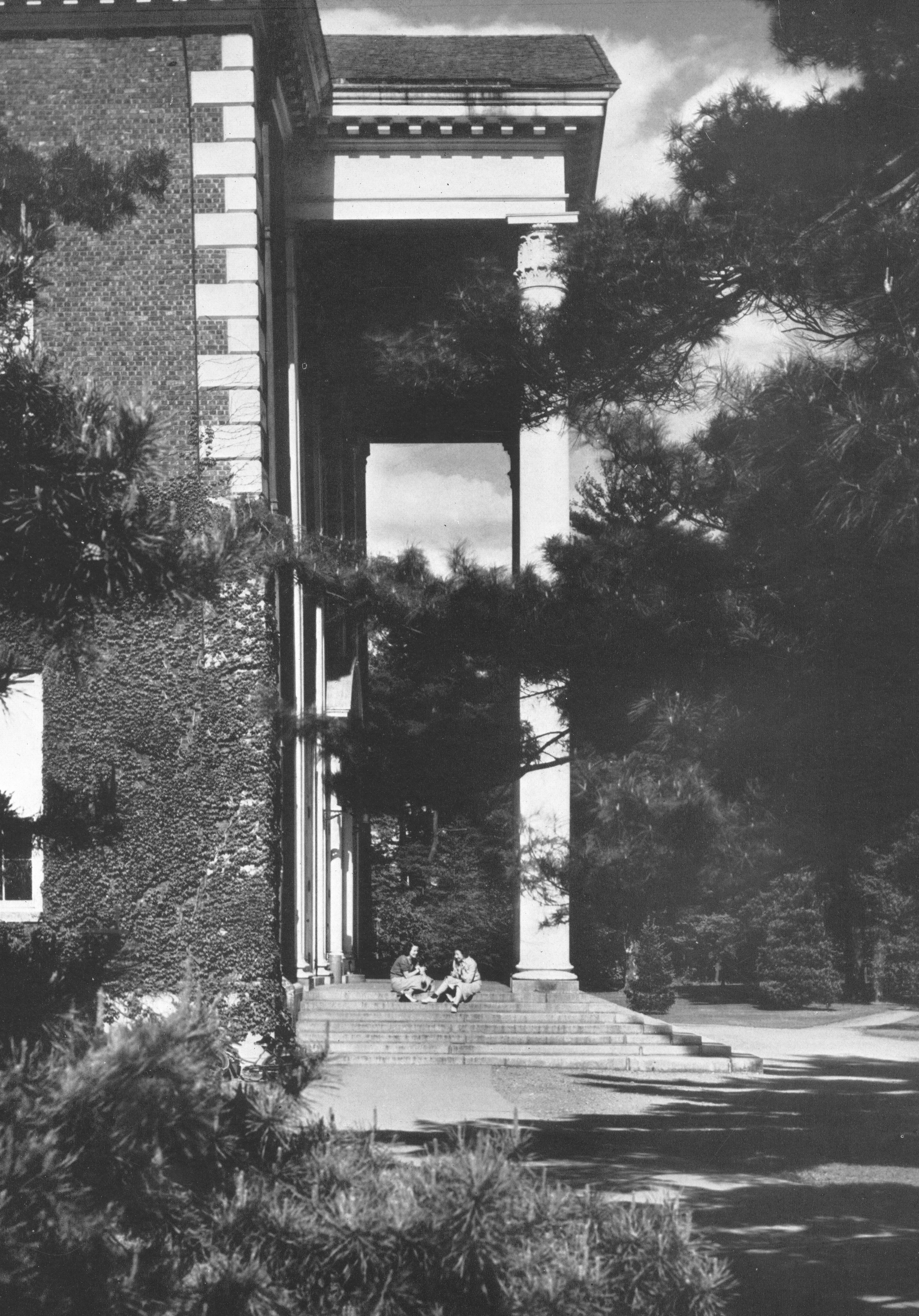
The Students' Building c. 1940

James Monroe Taylor, fourth president of Vassar College in the town of Poughkeepsie, New York, wrote in 1901 of a dearth of a dedicated social space on campus "not devoted to college work but to college recreation." He envisioned a building akin to Harvard's University Club and the University of Pennsylvania's Houston Club; with a swelling student body size and rapid decentralization of the campus over the course of the first decade of the 1900s, the need for such a structure become even more crucial.

The Students' Building was erected in 1913 after its cornerstone was laid on September 25, 1912. Funding for its construction came from an anonymous donor who sought to provide for the "exclusive needs and interests of student organizations" with the gift and who specified the name Students' Building for the structure. Mary Babbott Ladd of the Vassar class of 1908 was later identified as that donor.

Until World War II, dining at Vassar was an elegant affair with table linens and serving maids, but after the war was over, these features were never brought back to student life. In 1973, the All Campus Dining Center, also called the ACDC or the Deece, opened within the building, serving as a replacement to individual dining rooms in each of the college's dormitories. The old system had proved too costly and overcrowded, necessitating the ACDC's creation. The $3.5 million renovation was conducted by Walker O. Cain and Associates, with over $1 million of the funds coming from friends and family of Babbott Ladd. An $11 million renovation in 2003 was designed by Finegold Alexander & Associates.

Another project, to renovate the kitchen of the Dining Center and adjust the locations of the building's bathrooms began in 2016. The changes, undertaken by LTL Architects, totaled $8–9 million and concluded with an open plan renovation, the refurbishment of some of the center's original features, and an increase in buildingwide capacity to over 1,000 occupants. Work began in earnest on the dining center mid-2017 and concluded at the beginning of the following academic year, opening August 25, 2017. The All Campus Dining Center was renamed Gordon Commons the following year, in gratitude for gifts to support the renovations made by Ellen Rubin Gordon, chair and CEO of Tootsie Roll Industries, who was a member of Vassar's class of 1952.

== Architecture and uses ==
The Students' Building was designed by the New York City architecture firm of McKim, Mead & White, representing their only project at Vassar College. The plans were drawn up by young architect Joseph Herenden Clark, a recent graduate of the Columbia School of Architecture who, upon hearing the requirement that the structure be made from brick with white trim and a slate roof, recalled Christ Church in Alexandria, Virginia. Clark had studied Christ Church, which George Washington attended, during his days at Columbia. He trekked to Alexandria to study the interior and exterior of the church and ultimately the designs for the Students' Building, his first public plan, were inspired by its architecture and features. Bishop and Company were contracted to construct the Students' Building, an example of the Southern colonial revival style. It sits on the north edge of campus due south of the college's North Gate and southeast of residential quad dorms like Lathrop House. Noyes House was built in 1958 and rests immediately to the southeast of the Students' Building.

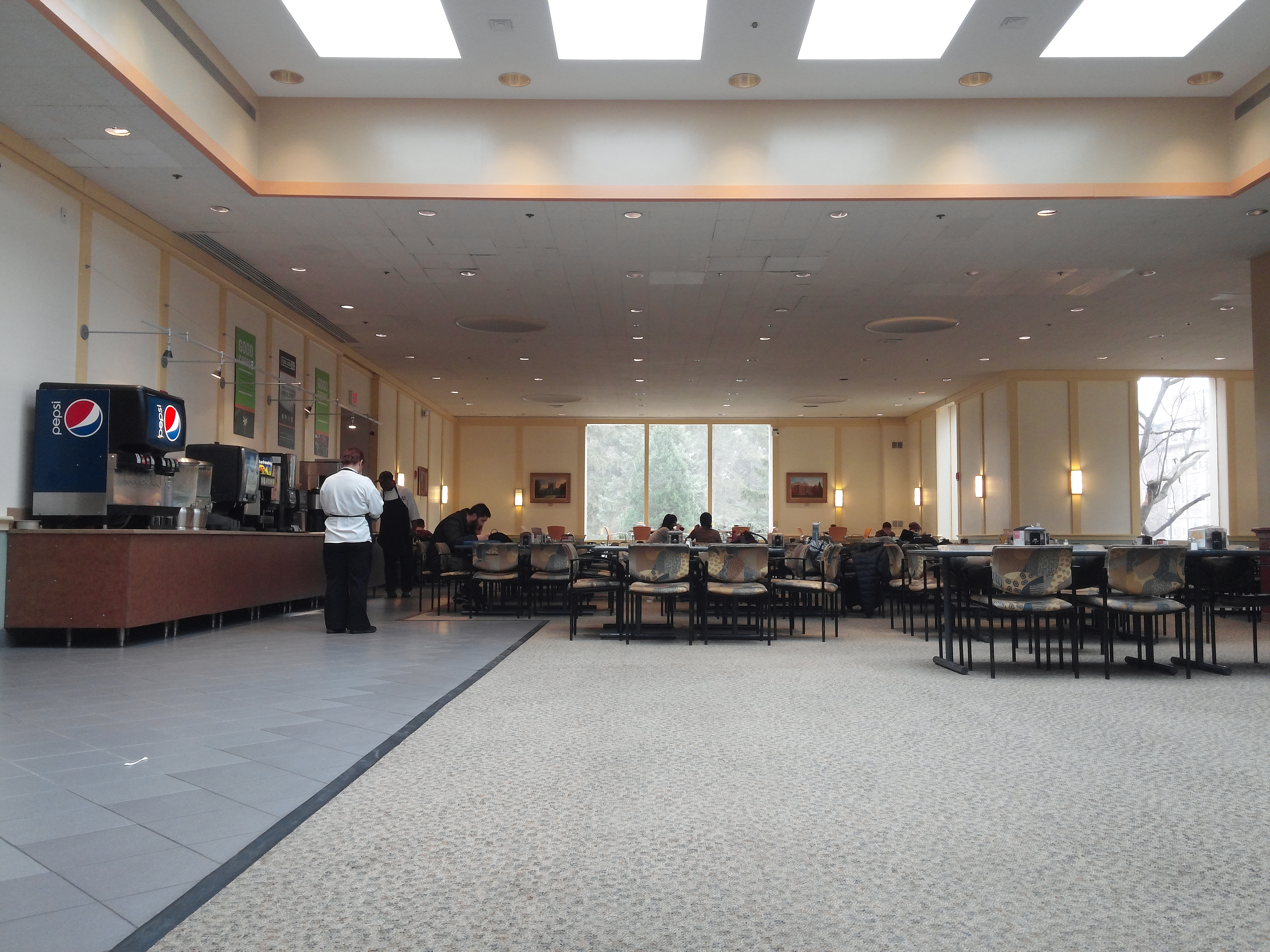
The west dining wing of the Students' Building before 2017 renovations

When the Students' Building opened, it stood two stories tall with a basement, as well as wooden pillars on its facade supporting a pediment. A cupola topped the structure and stairs beneath the pediment led to a three sets of double doors—one large, the others smaller but otherwise identical. Above each set of doors was a single large window. In the 1973 renovation, two red brick wings were added to the east and west sides of the building to accommodate numerous dining rooms. Featuring large windows, the new wings were more modern in their style than the old central portion of the building.

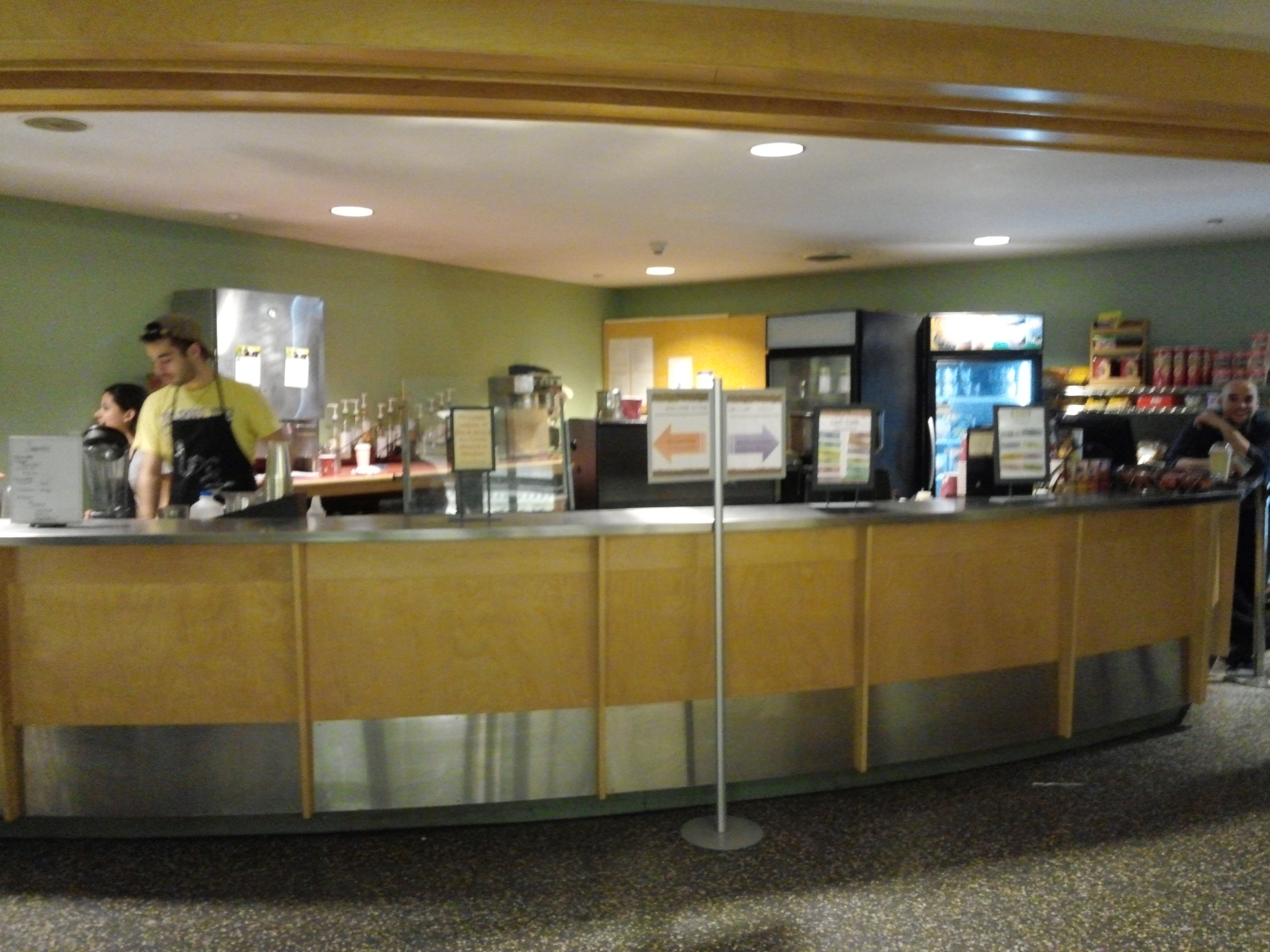
The UpC Cafe on the building's third floor, closed in 2015

The first floor of the building was built as a grand 1,200-seat auditorium with a proscenium stage, and meeting rooms dedicated to student organizations. The second floor consisted of a U-shaped balcony and the Old Council Room, a gathering space for smaller organizations. The Old Council Room was repainted in 1945 as part of a minor renovation of the building that also included the opening of a student eatery called The Hoot on the west side. The ceiling was made from decorated plaster and dentils evoked the exterior neoclassical architectural style. The basement housed several offices and later a bicycle exchange, used bookshop, and student storage space. After the 1973 renovation, dishwashing equipment for the ACDC was housed upstairs, along with staff offices. The 2003 renovation saw the removal of this dishwashing equipment; instead, the second upstairs was repurposed as a multifunctional student space, in line with the original intentions for the building. The second story—called UpC—is now an open space capable of seating 600 people when chairs are added; it also features multimedia equipment and a third-floor mezzanine that, until 2015, housed the UpC Cafe.

Historically, the structure was used by and for student organizations. Formerly housed in the Calisthenium and Riding Academy and later the Alumnae Gymnasium, the Philaletheis Society moved into the Students' Building upon its opening and began to use the space for its theatrical performances. The junior prom, lectures from a wide array of speakers, and faculty-led skits all took place beneath the building's roof. Vassar's yearbook, the Vassarion, as well as its weekly newspaper, The Miscellany News, were also headquartered in the Students' Building. An annual Christmas party, complete with students clad as reindeer pulling a sled on which sat political science professor Charles Gordon Post dressed as Santa Claus, once occurred within the building as well.
