= Lathrop House (Vassar College) =

Residential dormitory in Poughkeepsie, New York, US

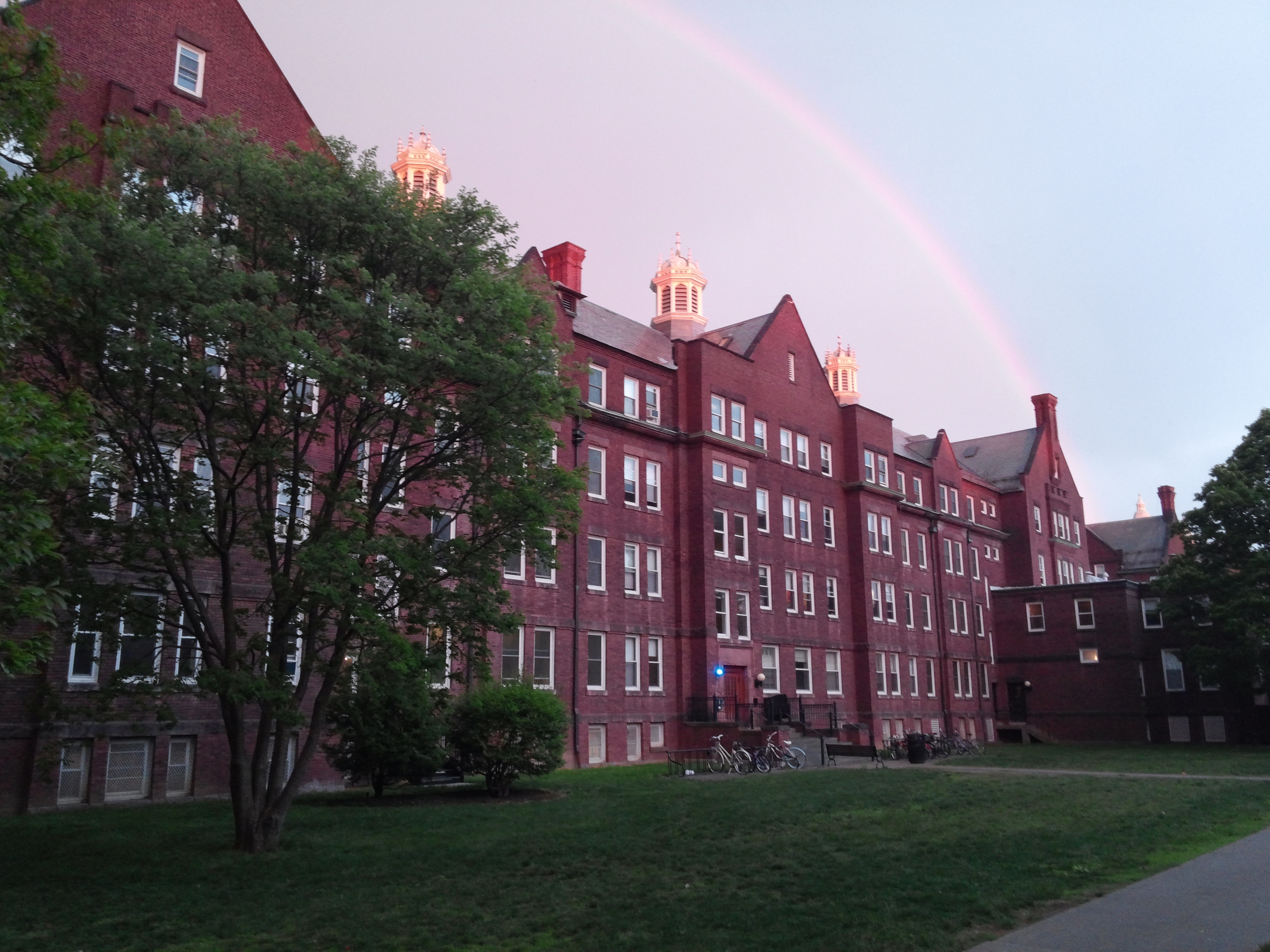
- Lathrop, viewed from the quad, in May 2014
- Interactive map of the Lathrop House area
- Alternative names: Edward Lathrop House

General information
- Type: Dormitory
- Architectural style: Elizabethan
- Location: Poughkeepsie, New York
- Coordinates: 41.689426°N 73.896351°W
- Current tenants: Vassar College
- Completed: 1901
- Owner: Vassar College

Technical details
- Material: Brick
- Floor count: 5

Design and construction
- Architecture firm: Allen & Vance

Lathrop House (known officially as Edward Lathrop House) was the third quadrangle dormitory built on Vassar College's campus in the town of Poughkeepsie, New York. Constructed in 1901 and designed by Boston-based Allen & Vance, the brick dorm stands five stories tall. Lathrop houses 180 students who may be any year or gender.

== History ==
Lathrop House was the third residential quadrangle (quad) dormitory built on the campus of Vassar College in the town of Poughkeepsie, New York. The college built Lathrop during a period of rapid dorm construction spanning 1893–1902 during which the older seminary-style model of housing—a single large hall in which all a college's residents lived, in Vassar's case Main Building—was quickly waning in popularity in favor of smaller individual houses. The project began with the opening of Strong House in 1893 and continued with Raymond House in 1897; Lathrop followed in 1901, and Davison House's erection completed the quad in 1902. Construction of the dorm was paid for with Vassar's funds, unlike Strong House which had been paid for by a gift from John D. Rockefeller.

The dormitory is named after Dr. Edward Lathrop, one of Vassar's charter trustees, and carries the full name Edward Lathrop House. Lathrop's daughter, Julia, was a graduate of the Vassar class of 1880.

In 1979, the Intercultural Center, a multicultural student space, moved into Lathrop in spite of initial disagreement by members of the house two years earlier when the idea was first proposed. The Intercultural Center later moved out of Lathrop's basement and into its own dedicated space in the early 1990s, at which point it was replaced by a Jewish co-op and kitchen. In 1995, the Kosher Co-Op moved out of Lathrop and into a newly acquired Jewish house across the street from the college.

== Architecture and features ==
Lathrop was designed by the Boston architectural firm of Francis Richmond Allen and J. McArthur Vance who were also responsible for the design of its neighbor, Davison House, in 1902. Formulating a design for these two buildings was not difficult as a template had already been set by way of the preexisting Strong and Raymond Houses. Frederick Law Olmsted, a consultant of design for the college, recommended that any new dorms in the area be built in an "echelon formation" in order to provide for a greater sense of openness. Allen disregarded this advice, instead opting to place the dorm, along with Davison, in "two long unbroken rows of buildings on the bias". Lathrop was ultimately placed north of Strong, across the quad to the east of Davison, and diagonally across from Raymond.

Lathrop stands five stories tall with an additional basement level. The dormitory, Elizabethan in style, is a brick building with elements of brownstone trim. The roof is a Vermont slate and from it rise five chimneys, each built with two wythes of brick and capped with bluestone. There are also multiple cupolas that are framed with wood, include painted louvered slats, and have topped with a coat of terne. The building also has parapets, unlike neighboring Strong.

The house is co-ed and currently has a capacity of 180 students. Students in Lathrop, which houses students of all class years, may live in either single rooms, one-room doubles, or three-room triples. Bathrooms are shared by all members of a hall.
