= The Philaletheis Society =

Student theatre group at Vassar College

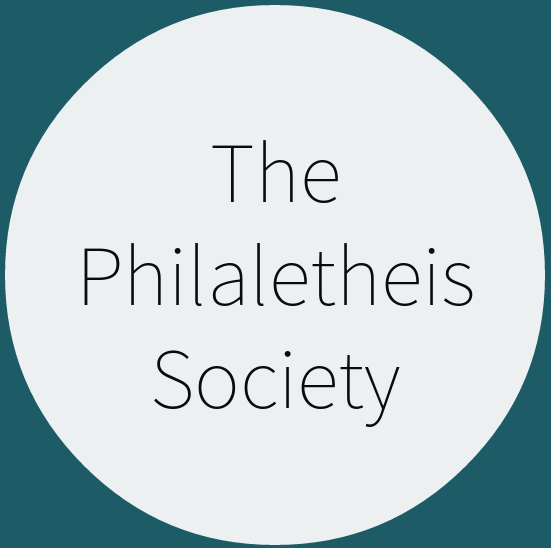
- The Philaletheis Society's logo as of 2014
- Founded: December 2, 1865; 159 years ago Vassar College
- Type: Student society
- Affiliation: Independent
- Status: Active
- Emphasis: Theater
- Scope: Local
- Chapters: 1
- Former name: The Philalethean Society
- Headquarters: Poughkeepsie, New York; United States
- Website: philaletheis.org

The Philaletheis Society (often shortened to Philaletheis or just Phil and founded as The Philalethean Society) is a student theatre group at Vassar College in the town of Poughkeepsie, New York, and the school's oldest student organization. Founded in December 1865, Phil began as a college literary society and its first leader was college president John Howard Raymond. Control of the organization was swiftly handed to the students and the group split into three chapters, each with a distinct focus. The group maintained its literary focus until the 1890s, by which point dramatic productions had taken over in popularity. The tradition of producing four and later three plays per year continued into the mid-twentieth century, but in 1958, the organization disbanded due to lack of interest. It was revived in 1975, first as an arm of student government and then as an independent student organization.

The group is run by an executive board that selects which plays to produce each year based on the proposals received from student-directors. Auditions are open to all Vassar students but those interested in directing must have previously completed a directing workshop through the organization.

== History ==
According to alumna Maria Dickinson McGraw, the creation of a college literary society at Vassar College in the town of Poughkeepsie, New York, was proposed by students during the first week of the school's first year. Later that year, on December 2, 1865, the Philalethean Society was founded, becoming the first student group at Vassar. It was organized and helmed by John Howard Raymond, president of the college. While Raymond was the organization's first leader, students in the organization quickly saw fit to transition to self-governance; Raymond "was not re-elected." The Society's first student president was M. L. Dickinson, who also served as one of the several editors of the inaugural edition of Vassariana, the precursor to Vassar's weekly newspaper, The Miscellany News. Named for the term philalethea, meaning "truth-loving", the Society was split into three distinct chapters, each with a specialized focus. The Alpha arm of the organization focused on literary works, the Beta chapter did dramatic exercises, and the Delta chapter was involved with musical pursuits. Later, it added a fourth chapter. Until the alumnae gymnasium—later Ely Hall—was built, the organization was headquartered in the Society Room on the second floor of the school's Calisthenium and Riding Academy.

The Society's first public meeting occurred in June 1866, with invitations sent to Vassar students reading "The pleasure of your company is invited to a literary entertainment." The event included music, prayer, and the performance of original poems, songs, essays, and a drama piece. Further meetings happened in December, at which point a scene from Henry VIII was produced, and again the following June, at which point Vassar students recited nine of William Shakespeare's monologues for female characters. By 1871, the Society was sizable, consisting of 127 members. It retained its original literary focus through the 1890s.

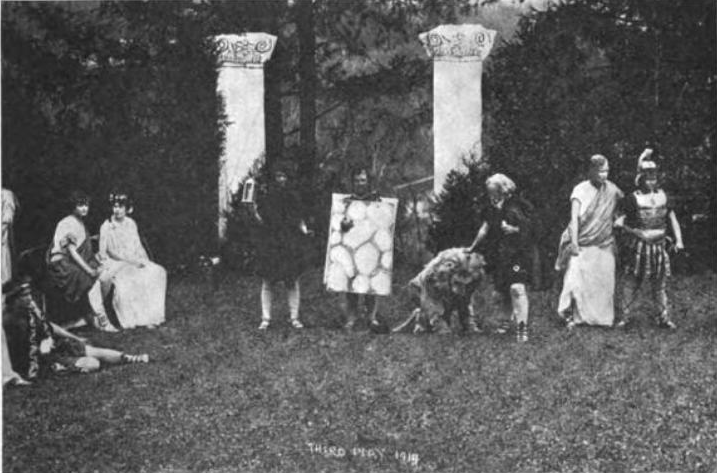
An outdoor production of A Midsummer Night's Dream in 1914

The college's 50th anniversary fell in 1915; by this point, the society had transitioned its focus exclusively to dramatic arts. In 1890, when someone discovered that the term Philalethea was not proper Greek, the group changed its name to the more correct Philaletheis Society or Phil for short. While the group had originally performed four shows per year, by 1915 it was down to three plays annually including one outdoors that was usually a Shakespeare show, and indoor productions of contemporary dramas, comedies, and older works such as The Critic and She Stoops to Conquer. The year 1908 saw the abolition of the chapters and their plays, which had ostensibly come to serve as a proving ground for undiscovered Vassar women who wanted to take part in the larger productions sponsored by the entire Philaletheis organization. The chapters' plays were prepared in just one week each leading to the criticism that their presentations were "hasty and patchy", and the establishment of competitive auditions for the main Phil plays rendered obsolete the model of chapter plays as proving grounds for new actresses. The group had produced 147 full shows by this time. A song in a marziale tempo, "Hail to thee, Philaletheis!", was published in 1908.

Philaletheis had its offices in the 1913 Students' Building for many years. The tradition of putting on three plays each year continued through the 1940s, including presenting the third and final play outdoors. In 1950, Philaletheis was identified by the Miscellany News as one of the "Big Five" organizations, a quintet of student groups "which include[d] nearly every extra-curricular activity which [took] place on campus". Each student became a member of each of the Big Five (Note: The Big Five organizations included, in addition to Philaletheis, the Community Religious Association, the Weekend Activities Association, the Athletic Association, and the Political Association.) organizations upon their matriculation to the college. In 1958, however, the group's focus had shifted and it now stood primarily as an organization through which freshmen could try out theatre arts before moving on to the drama department for more serious dramatic work. Later that year, Philaletheis disbanded due to insufficient interest from students.

=== Reboot ===
In 1975, a group of students interested in extracurricular theatre revived the Philaletheis Society after a 17-year absence. Citing an interest in producing shows without being involved in the college's drama department (a requirement for involvement at the time), the rebooted Phil's first performance was Agatha Christie's The Mousetrap. The next year, the Student Government Association (SGA) took over the organization, merging it with its extant Drama Funds Committee to create "the sole producing agent of independent student theatre on the Vassar campus". By the 1980s, Phil split from student government while retaining its funding from the latter.

The group was struggling to find space to rehearse and perform by 1989. The Students' Building where Philaletheis had once performed had been transformed into the All Campus Dining Center and the old performance space was neither replaced nor replicated elsewhere on campus. To remedy this, in 1993 and 1994, Vassar invested in the renovation of one of its disused buildings, a former functioning coal bin, into the Coal Bin Theater to be used by Philaletheis and the other student theatre and comedy groups that had been created by this time.

== Operations ==
Early in the Society's history, when its focus was still primarily literary, membership was considered by a committee for three days and then voted upon. By 1908, that model had been abandoned in favor of an open system in which any student who paid an annual fee could be part of the group. At that time, Philaletheis was governed by a six-member board consisting of a president and vice-president (both seniors), secretary, treasurer, and props manager (juniors), and an assistant props manager (a sophomore). In 1951, the board was vastly expanded to include managers of scenery, lights, sound, makeup, publicity, and a number of other fields.

The rebooted 1975 version of Philaletheis, as a committee of the SGA, was governed by the SGA's president. Membership was by application for all positions. Once the organization split from student government, it was run by a seven-member board and accepted proposals for shows, ranging from musicals to one-act plays. Recently, the Society has accepted proposals for shows at the beginning of every semester, then the production board has voted on which shows to produce. Each production then holds its own auditions for actors, with no experience required. Directors seeking to produce a full-length show must first direct a shorter directing workshop, usually a scene running 15 minutes or shorter. Directing workshops occur twice a year, early in fall and spring semesters. For the 2015 fiscal year, the group's budget was $12,000.
