= Cushing House =

Student dormitory at Vassar College

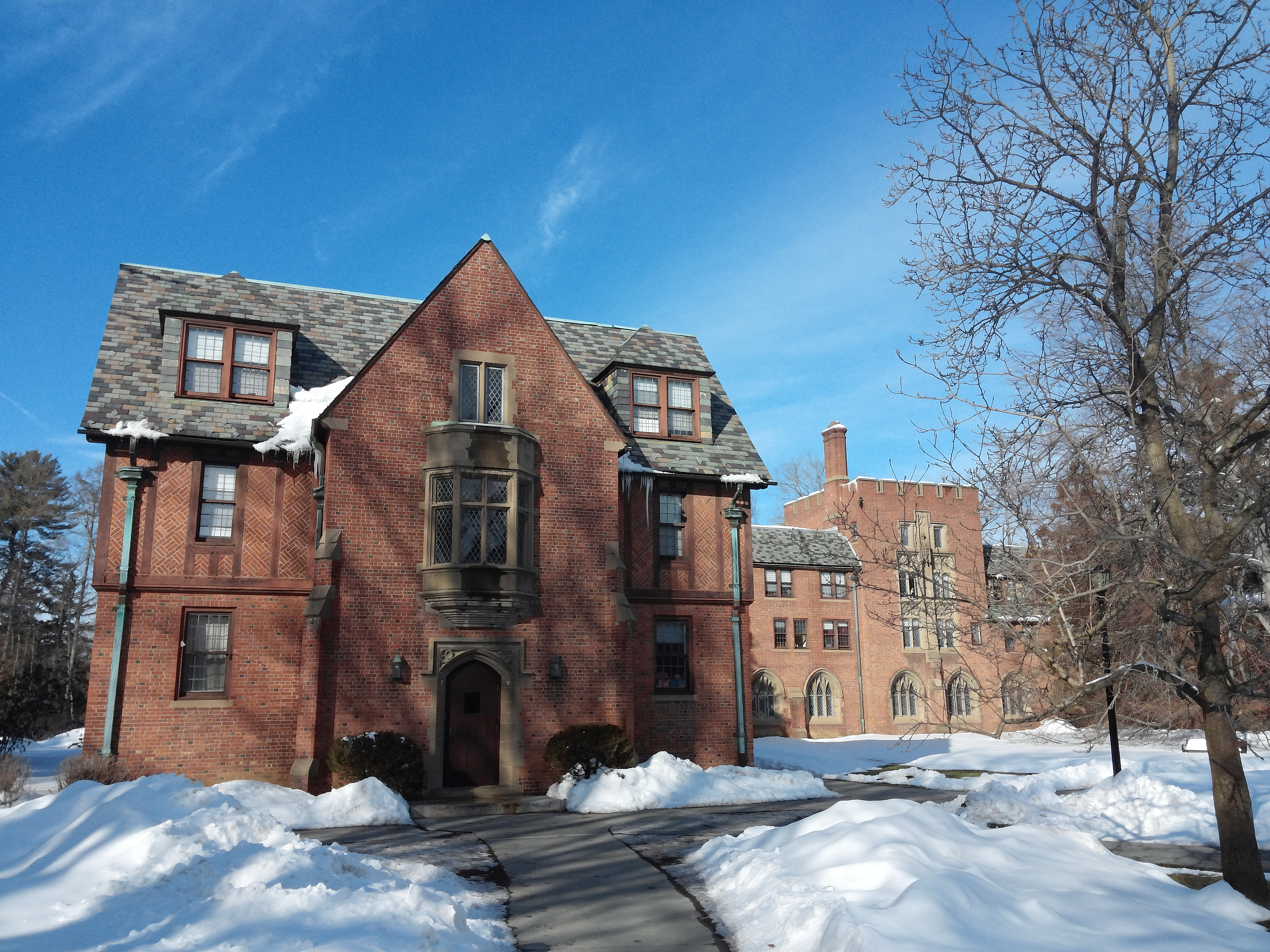
- Cushing's west wing, with its central hall visible to the right
- Former names: Cushing Hall

General information
- Type: Dormitory
- Architectural style: Old English manor house
- Location: Poughkeepsie, New York, United States
- Coordinates: 41.689428°N 73.893118°W
- Current tenants: Vassar College
- Completed: 1927
- Cost: $400,000 (1927)
- Owner: Vassar College

Technical details
- Floor count: 4

Design and construction
- Architecture firm: Allen & Collens

Cushing House (formerly called Cushing Hall) is a four-story dormitory on Vassar College's campus in the town of Poughkeepsie, New York. A response to freshmen overcrowding, the college's Board of Trustees hurried the Allen & Collens-designed building, named for college librarian and alumna trustee Florence M. Cushing, to construction and completion in 1927. Cushing was originally designed as eight smaller houses with euthenic principles in mind, but ended up as a single U-shaped dormitory in the Old English manor house style with Jacobean interior furnishings.

Students of all grades may live in the house, which houses up to 202 in single, double, and triple rooms. Throughout Cushing's history, various proposals and plans have incited controversy among the building's residents, including designating one of its wings as all-black housing and converting one of its common areas into eight single rooms. Contemporary reviewers have looked favorably upon Cushing's aesthetic qualities, declaring it to be one of Vassar's most beautiful buildings.

== History ==
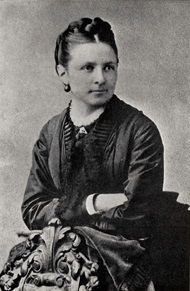
Florence Cushing, the dormitory's namesake, in 1874

Before Cushing House's construction, Vassar College in the town of Poughkeepsie, New York, faced a housing deficit relative to the number of students it enrolled, a situation deemed an emergency by the college's Board of Trustees. For the first quarter of the twentieth century, one third of the college's freshmen were housed off campus due to rising enrollment over that period. The Board voted in 1925 to move all students to on-campus housing, acknowledging the lack of adequate space for the move but pledging that they would swiftly build more. The following year, the Board voted to begin construction on the new hall without first securing funding for the building, trusting that the "friends of the College" would meet the financial demands of the project. In the meantime, the house was built using loaned funds, with the total project cost coming to $400,000.

Original plans for Cushing House, then called Cushing Hall, saw the building as a model of Vassar's euthenics program. The term euthenics was first defined by Ellen Swallow Richards of Vassar's class of 1870 as "the betterment of living conditions, though conspicuous endeavor for the purpose of securing more efficient human beings". In accordance with these principles, initial schematics saw the dormitory divided into eight separate houses all surrounded by a brick wall. Cushing was ultimately designed by architectural firm Allen & Collens which was also responsible for several other buildings on Vassar's campus including the Thompson Memorial Library and its wings before Cushing's completion, Wimpfheimer Nursery School concurrently, and Skinner Hall of Music afterwards in 1932. The Cushing project was completed in 1927 and the dormitory was named for the college's first alumnae trustee, Florence M. Cushing, who was a member of the Vassar class of 1874 and the college's librarian from the year of her graduation until 1876. On account of her death in September 1927, Cushing Hall was not dedicated in time for the incoming class of freshman for the 1927–28 school year; instead, the dedication which was marked by an informal reception was put off until October 29 of the same year.

In 1954, Cushing residents were "perturbed" by the possibility of a new language hall being built within the dormitory's sightlines, citing the concern that any artificial construction would ruin their views. Another controversy arose in April 1970 after students from Cushing objected to a plan put forth by a contingent of black students and approved by the Board of Trustees that would designate one wing of Cushing as a co-ed housing space for black students of all grades. Prior to the plan's formulation, upperclassmen black students could opt to live in a student community in Kendrick House while underclassmen could live in an analogous community in Main Building. Cushing residents were not notified of the plan until after its approval and a public meeting was held at which objections were raised by both Cushing residents and black students that one wing of the dorm might not be enough space to foster a black community and that Kendrick House should instead be repurposed as elective all-black housing. After the college's administration expressed the possibility that this plan might be in violation of U.S. Department of Health, Education, and Welfare standards on segregation, all but four black students walked out of the meeting and the assembly decided that the Board of Trustees needed to be better informed of the racial climate on campus. In 1974, Vassar's Master Planning Committee voted to convert one of Cushing's common areas, then a dining room, to eight single dorms. An emergency meeting was held and students organized a Save Cushing Dining Room movement which collected 800 signatures against the plan in 24 hours. Other instances have seen one of Cushing's parlors converted to a quad dorm used to house students temporarily when no other housing could be found for them, first in 1989 then again during the first semester of the 1998–99 school year.

== Architecture and features ==
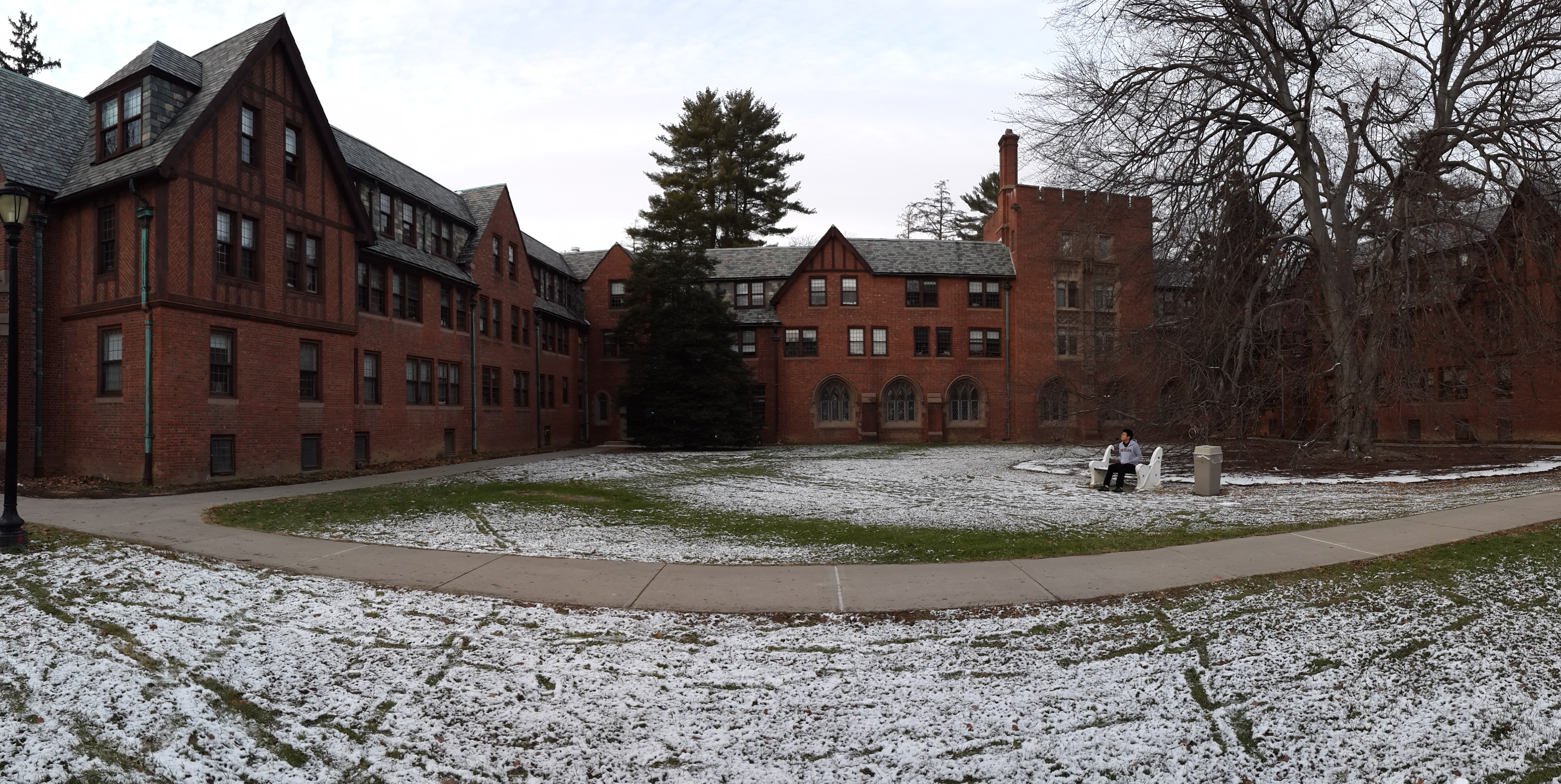
Cushing's three-story west wing (left), with its four-story central tower and transverse halls visible center

Cushing House was built on the north side of campus and sits apart from most of the school's other dorms, with the exception of Noyes House to its west. Cushing stands four stories tall and is configured in a U shape with two wings of student rooms connected by center common areas on the ground floor and more halls of student housing on the upper transverse (inter-wing) levels. Between the wings is a courtyard covered by a lawn and trees. Two articles published in Vassar's weekly Miscellany News in 1975 identified some of the species present at the time: Cryptomeria japonica, Ilex opaca (American holly), several crab apple trees, and a Fagus sylvatica (European beech). The exterior of the house is built in an Old English manor house style designed to mimic the nearby Pratt House which was designed by architects York and Sawyer and completed in 1916. The roof of the hall is made of slate, with walls of patterned brickwork covered with half-timbered decorations as well as leaded windows and towers. A smaller wing, sometimes referred to as the SQs ("servants' quarters") or "maid's wing", abuts the center common area and includes a pantry and kitchen on its ground floor and smaller dorm rooms that originally housed servants on the floors above.

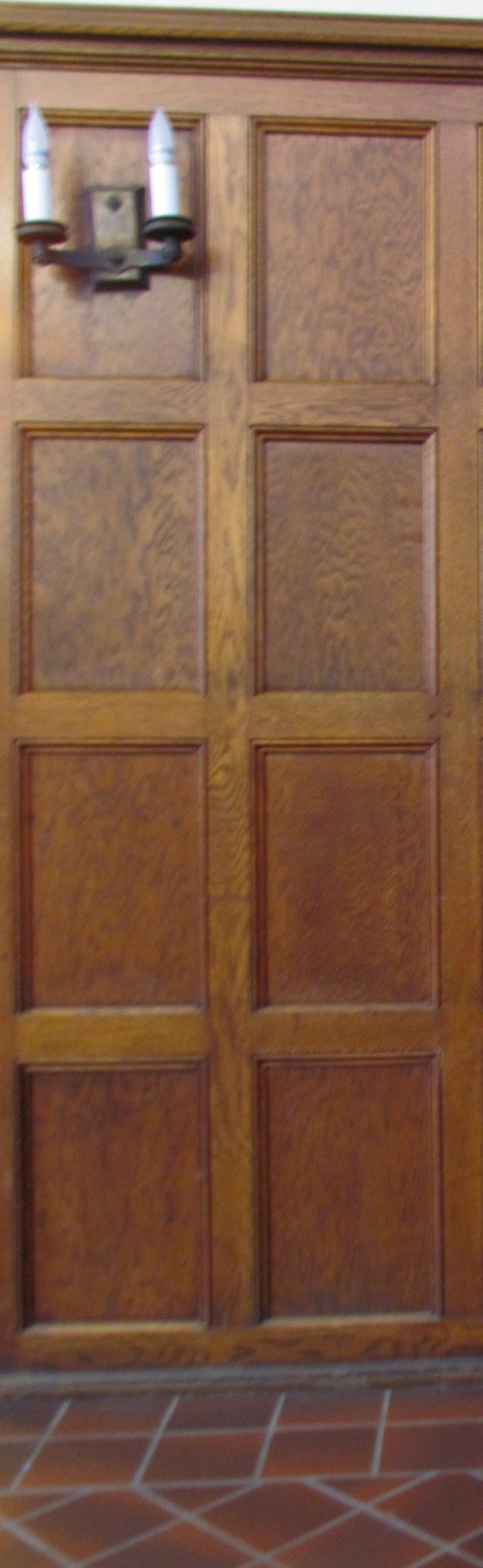
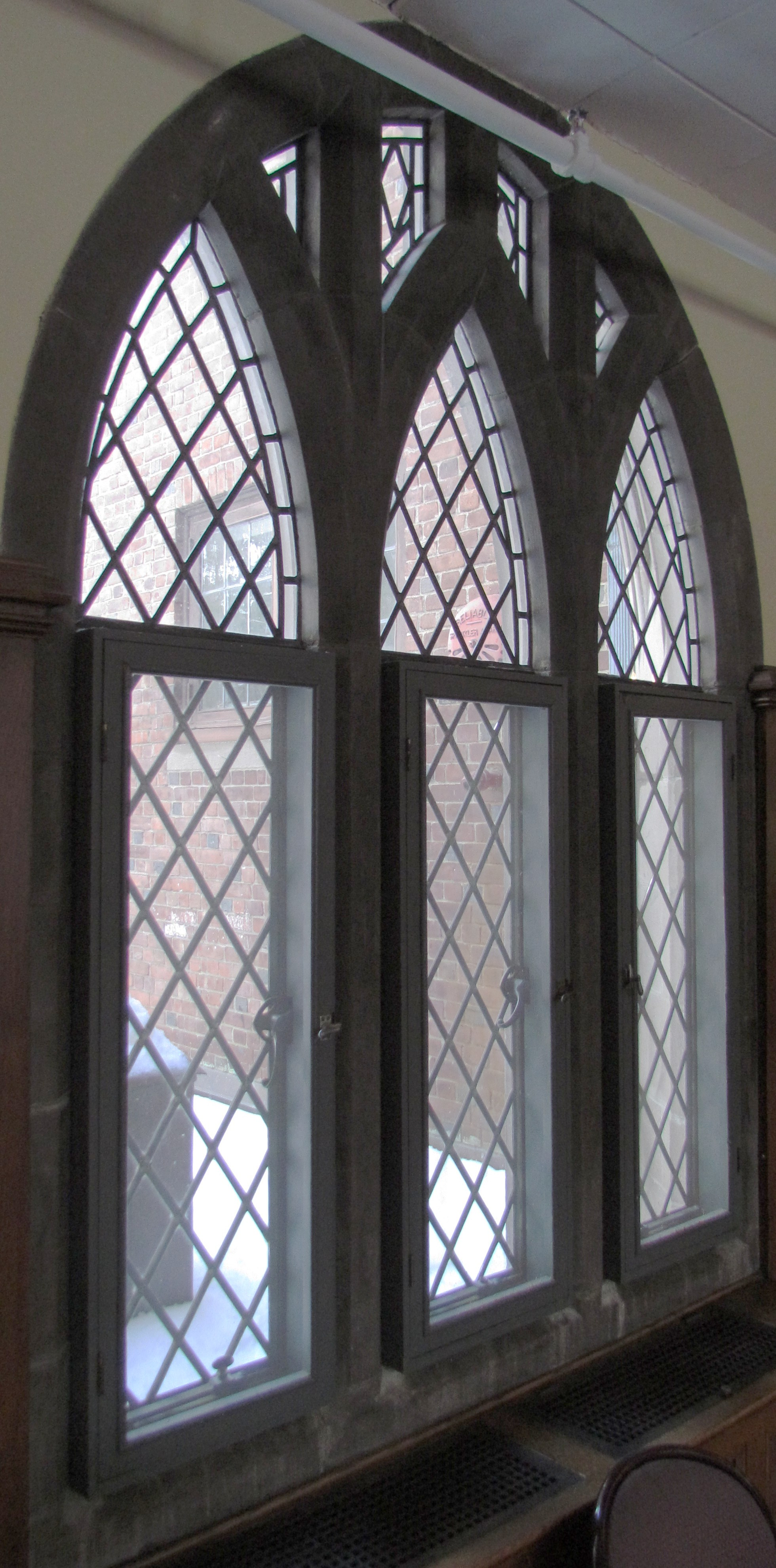
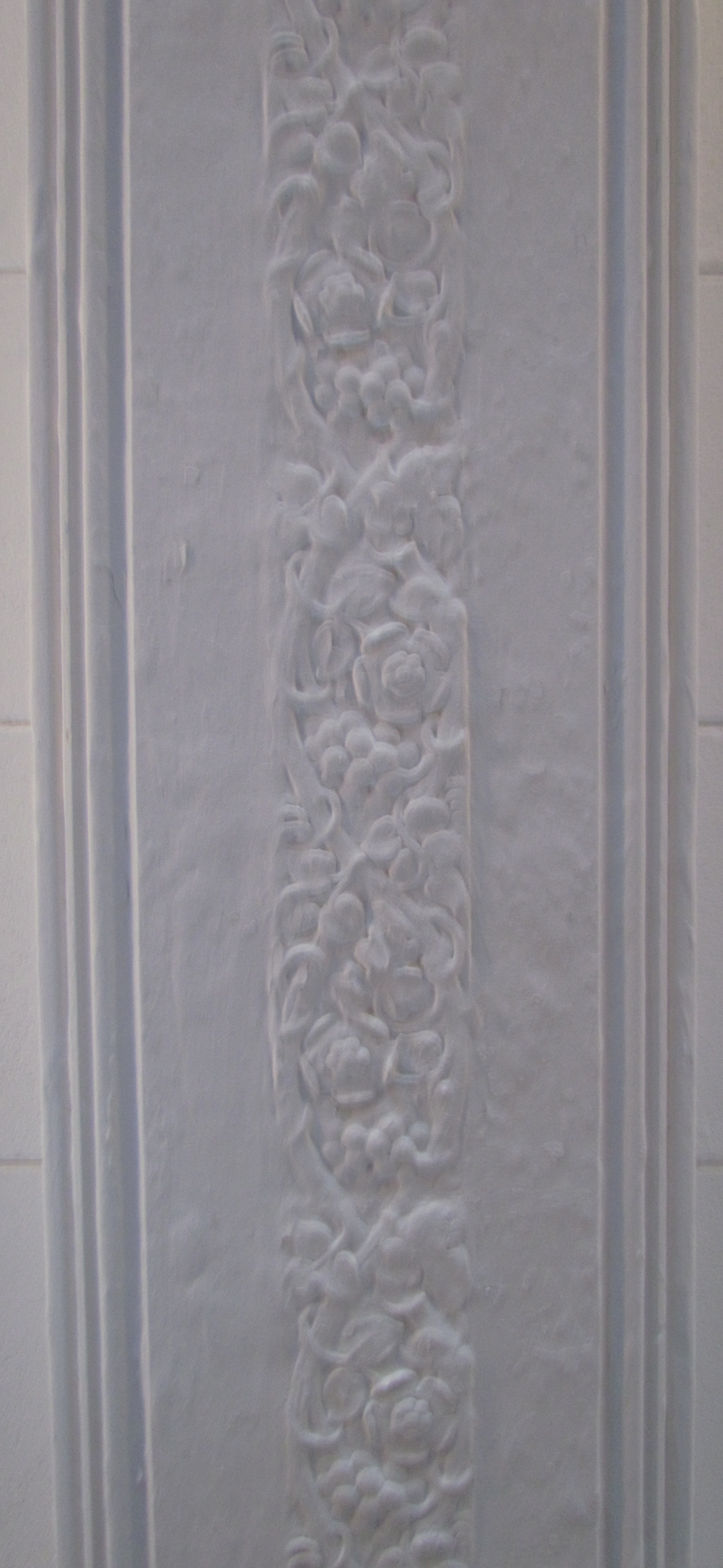
The dorm's interior features, including wood paneling, traceried windows, and decorated plaster ceilings

Inside the dorm, common area furnishings are Jacobean in style and architectural features include plaster ceilings, windows with tracery, and wood paneling. Within rooms, closets and windows are also notably large and soft light is present throughout the hall. The building was designed to house 130 students split between two double rooms and 126 singles, but now fits up to 202 students, demonymously referred to as "Cushlings". The house presently includes single dorms, one-room doubles, and two-room doubles and triples. Upon opening in 1927 (prior to Vassar's 1969 transition from being an all-female to co-ed college), the dormitory was limited to housing freshmen. It is now co-ed and acts as home to students from all grades including, as of 1999, the highest proportion of upperclassmen of any dorm at the school. Bathrooms are shared by all members of a hall. A minor renovation in summer 1995 and funded by the Estée Lauder Companies included more efficient lighting, rewiring, and new furniture for the house. Like all other Vassar dorms, Cushing houses a game room, a laundry room, and a Steinway grand piano.

In 1928, a year after Cushing opened, Keene Richards, Vassar College's general manager, wrote to college president Henry Noble MacCracken that Cushing was "neither luxurious nor extravagant." Authors Karen Van Lengen and Lisa Reilly countered this sentiment in their 2004 architectural guide to the campus, noting that "Cushing's cozy domesticity is a far cry from the institutional nature of collegiate residential architecture found on other college campuses" and concluding that the dorm was one of the most beautiful buildings on campus. Another guide, compiled in 2003 by the staff of the Yale Daily News, identified the dorm as one of the two most popular at the college, along with Jewett House. Cushing has drawn comparisons to the fictitious Hogwarts School for Witchcraft and Wizardry according to The Miscellany News. The building's parlor was singled out in College Prowler's 2012 guide to the college as the most beautiful at Vassar.
