= Ely Hall =

Building at Vassar College

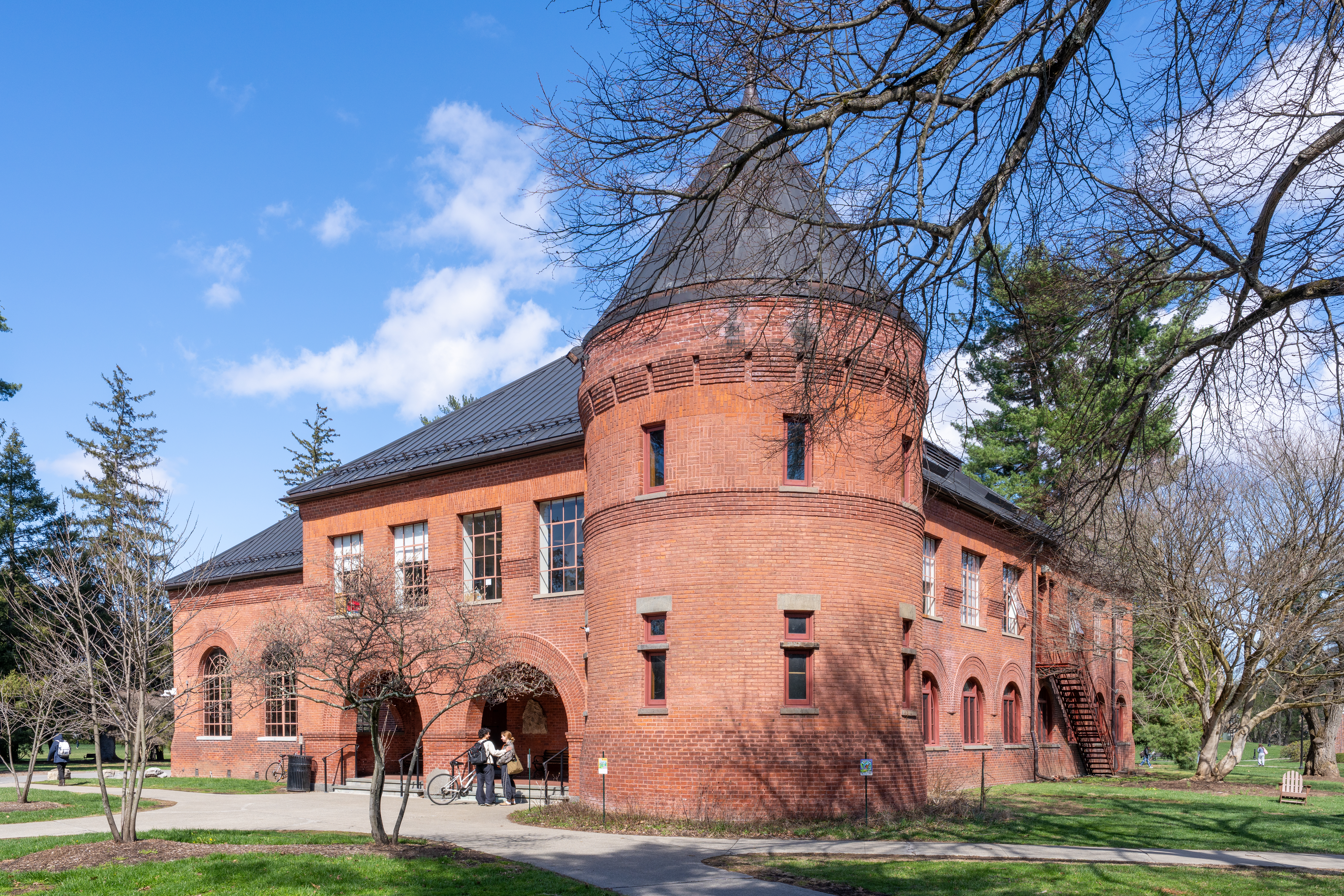
- Ely's facade in 2026
- Interactive map of the Ely Hall area
- Former names: Alumnae Gymnasium

General information
- Type: Classroom, laboratory, meeting space
- Architectural style: Richardsonian Romanesque
- Location: Poughkeepsie, New York, US
- Coordinates: 41.6880603°N 73.8950368°W
- Named for: Achsah M. Ely
- Groundbreaking: March 29, 1889
- Opened: November 23, 1889
- Renovated: 1906, 1994
- Cost: $22,000
- Renovation cost: $25,000 (1906)
- Owner: Vassar College

Technical details
- Material: Brick
- Floor count: Two

Design and construction
- Architect: William Tubby
- Main contractor: Mr. Otis

Renovating team
- Architect: William Downing (1906)
- Renovating firm: Olson Lewis Architects & Planners, Inc. (1994)

Ely Hall is a two-story Richardsonian Romanesque classroom and laboratory building on the campus of Vassar College in the town of Poughkeepsie, New York, US. The structure houses Vassar's Department of Earth Science and Geography, the A. Scott Warthin Jr. Museum of Geology and Natural History, and the Aula, a spacious and frequently used gathering space.

Originally known as the Alumnae Gymnasium, the building was erected as a response to the perception that Vassar's physical education program was falling behind those of other Seven Sisters colleges. Plans for the hall were made, scrapped, and remade as the college and alumnae benefactors struggled to raise sufficient funds. Ultimately, the building was designed by William Tubby and constructed in 1889, signaling a physical decentralization away from the college's Main Building. When it opened, the gymnasium featured a large pool and a variety of other athletic spaces. Vassar's enrollment quickly outgrew the limited space within the building, and it was first expanded and then superseded by Kenyon Hall in the 1930s. The Geology Department moved into the building shortly thereafter.

== History ==
=== Fundraising and planning ===
The physical education program at Vassar College in the town of Poughkeepsie, New York, was the first such program (Note: That is, the first collegiate physical education program at an American women's college, which Vassar remained until 1969, when the school began to admit male students.) in the United States. Its facilities were first housed within the school's Calisthenium and Riding Academy which opened in 1866, a year after Vassar's opening in 1865. Alumna Forence Cushing, along with a cohort of other Boston-based alumnae, observed in 1883 that Vassar's physical education program was lagging behind those at other recently opened Seven Sisters schools including Wellesley College and Smith College. The New York and Boston alumnae clubs began an attempt to raise $20,000, which they believed to be an adequate sum to pay for a new home for athletics at the school.

Fundraising efforts were led by Achsah M. Ely, a member of the college's class of 1868 and a professor of math at the school from 1887 to 1904. Donations came from a variety of sources including students attending the college (the class of 1889 donated a total of $148), student groups (the Philaletheis Society, the college's student dramatic organization, contributed $41 in the hopes it could use the building once completed), trustees, and alumnae and their families. By June 1887, the college had raised between $18,000–20,000 and so hired architect William Tubby to design the new hall. Tubby returned to the college with estimates from Poughkeepsie builders ranging in cost from $39,997–50,000, higher than the available budget. The Vassar Board of Trustees formed a subcommittee and attempted to find solutions, including modifying Tubby's designs. The subcommittee received estimates from builders outside of Poughkeepsie (in Kingston, Brooklyn, Troy, and Albany) but the lowest was still above budget at $32,000.

Tubby's initial plans were scrapped in October 1888 in favor of a pared-down version of the new building that was to include only dressing rooms and a single exercise hall, totaling no more than the available $20,000 in cost. In February 1889, Tubby came forth with a new plan that did away with some of the originally planned amenities for the building (including a running track suspended from the structure's roof) but nonetheless offered a host of features including a 47-by-27-foot (14.3 m × 8.2 m) swimming pool, the largest in any American college or university at the time of its opening. The pool was paid for by college trustee Frederick Ferris Thompson whose generosity earned him the nickname the "good times trustee". The 47-by-100-foot (14 m × 30 m) hall over the gymnasium's dressing rooms was used for tennis and plays put on by the Philaletheis Society, in a tradition that became known as "Hall Plays". It also housed a variety of other athletic and athletic support facilities such as a basketball court, lockers, and 87 dressing rooms.

=== Construction and operations ===
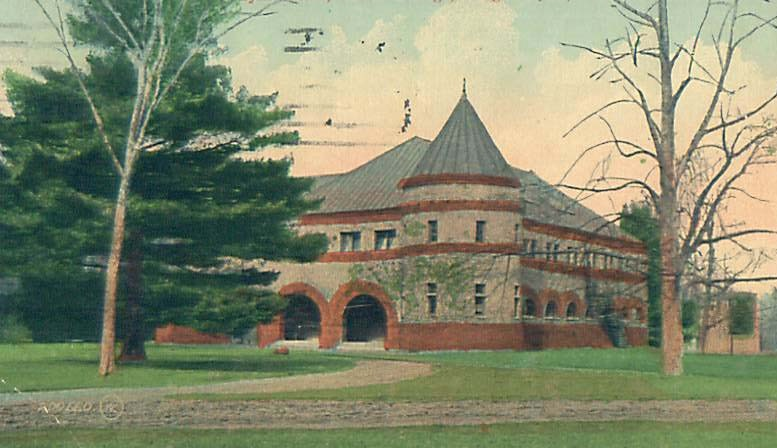
The Alumnae Gymnasium on a postcard, pictured 1913 or before

One Mr. Otis, a builder from Kingston, was employed by the college to construct the new gymnasium. The groundbreaking fell on March 29, 1889, and the structure was effectively complete by the following October although several issues persisted, such as an unsafe staircase requiring the construction of a second staircase elsewhere in the building, and a dearth of fire escapes. By this time, the project had totaled $22,000. Provided Vassar's society of alumnae would able to produce an additional $2,500 for improvements, the building was planned to open at the start of the athletic season in November. Once the money was raised and the construction flaws were fixed, the Alumnae Gymnasium opened on November 23 with a Philaletheis production of W. S. Gilbert's play Engaged. At the opening, the pool had yet to be filled with water. The building was officially presented to the Board of Trustees on June 11, 1890.

With its enrollment swelling, the college almost immediately outgrew the Alumnae Gymnasium. By September 1892, a second-floor hall was converted into an assembly hall and by 1897, a chemistry laboratory was moved from Main Building to a retrofitted auxiliary gym in the Alumnae Gymnasium. The Board of Trustees allocated $25,000 to expand the gymnasium on June 12, 1905, after considering options of expansion as early as 1901. William Downing was selected as the architect of the expansion.

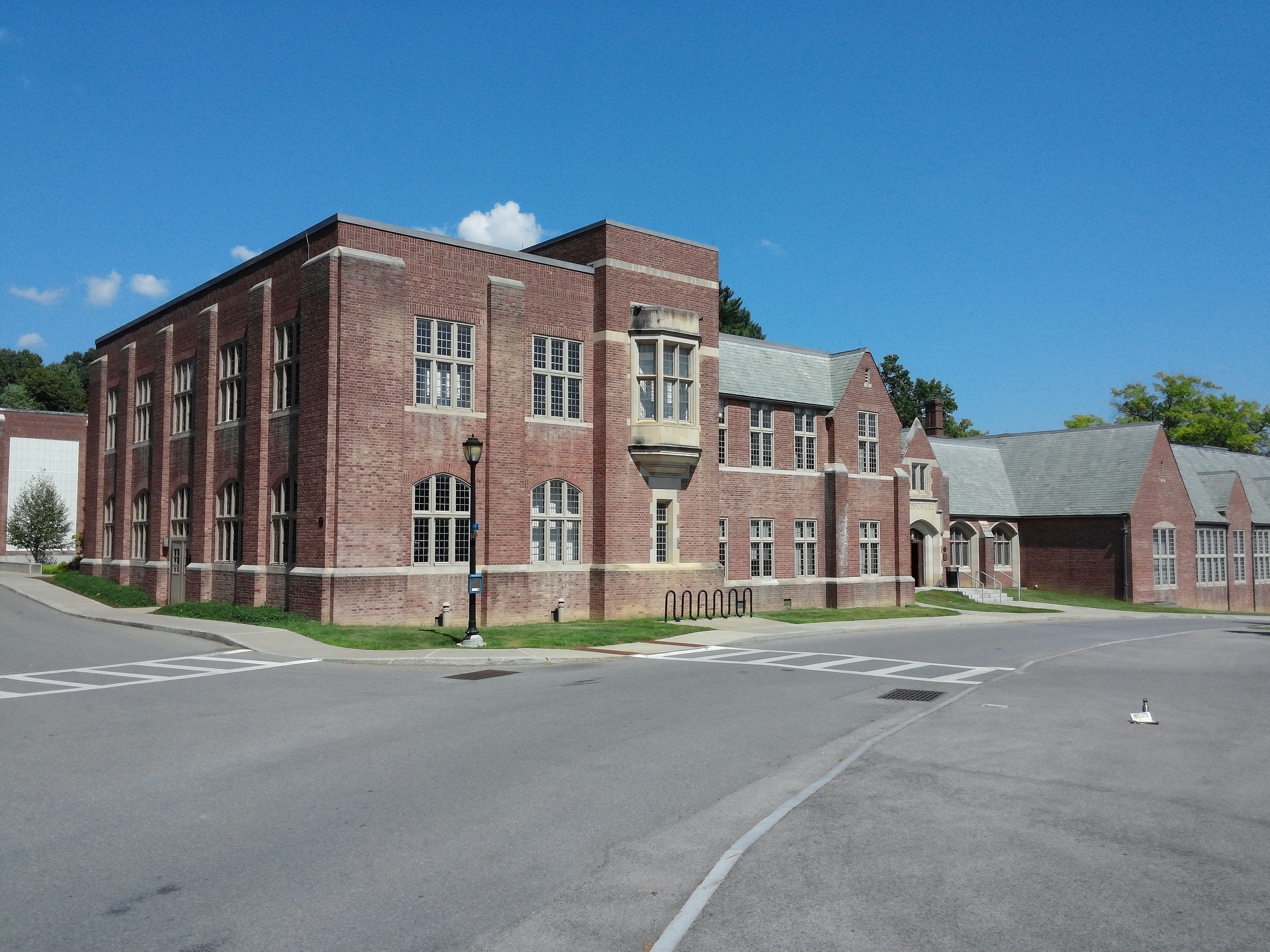
Kenyon Hall (pictured 2014) served as a replacement for the Alumnae Gymnasium's facilities.

By 1932, the Vassar population had outgrown the Alumnae Gymnasium and a new facility, the Helen Kenyon Hall of Physical Education, was built. Kenyon featured a new indoor pool (which, at 75 by 40 feet [23 m × 12 m], made it one of the United States' largest indoor swimming pools), as well as tennis, squash, and handball courts. Consequently, in 1933, the Alumnae Gymnasium was renamed Ely Hall after its early benefactor. In that same year, the building underwent minor renovation to convert some of the building's back rooms to an outpatient clinic, nurses' quarters, and doctors' offices.

Vassar's Geology Department was at this time housed in New England Building. A plan by the college's general manager, Keene Richards, and Thomas Hills, a geology professor, saw the Geology Department move from New England to Ely in 1937. Four second-story rooms were refitted for the use of fine art students, and the building's basketball court was converted into the Aula, an area dedicated to faculty events and gatherings modeled after similar facilities, called aulas from the Latin for "halls", in European universities. Ruth Adams of the Vassar class of 1904 was tasked with overseeing the renovation of the Aula. Ely was also home to a snack bar for a short period of time. The building was further renovated in 1994 by Olson Lewis Architects & Planners, Inc.

== Design and placement ==
The Alumnae Gymnasium was designed in the Richardsonian Romanesque style. While Tubby's original designs had called for the building to be constructed from stone, the revised plans he submitted in February 1889 replaced that stone with red brick. The structure stands two stories tall and features on its southwestern corner a rounded tower. Inlaid high into the patterned brickwork of its walls were Diocletian windows which originally served to provide light to the swimming pool while preventing passersby from seeing into the swimming area. The pool itself was lined with marble and fed by an artesian well 150 feet (46 m) deep. The room that would later become the Aula featured a fireplace adorned with terra cotta and raftered ceilings 35 feet (11 m) high. Recent renovations have returned the Aula space to its original state, with visible rafters, terra cotta accents, and hardwood floors.

The Alumnae Gymnasium's placement was selected by a committee of college trustees and alumnae by early 1889. The structure was to sit northeast of Main Building at a location approved by college president James Monroe Taylor. Taylor hoped the gymnasium was close enough to Main Building that it would be easily accessible but not so close that students would venture between the buildings without the proper clothing. He stipulated that the new structure's location would not impede the view from the Vassar College Observatory but that it would be close enough to be heated by the nearby power plant. Vassar College historian Elizabeth A. Daniels described the Alumnae Gymnasium's placement as "signal[ing] a willingness to expand the campus beyond the shadow of Main", elaborating that "Main was no longer the college's absolute center of life; change and expansion were in the air."

== Contemporary usage and facilities ==
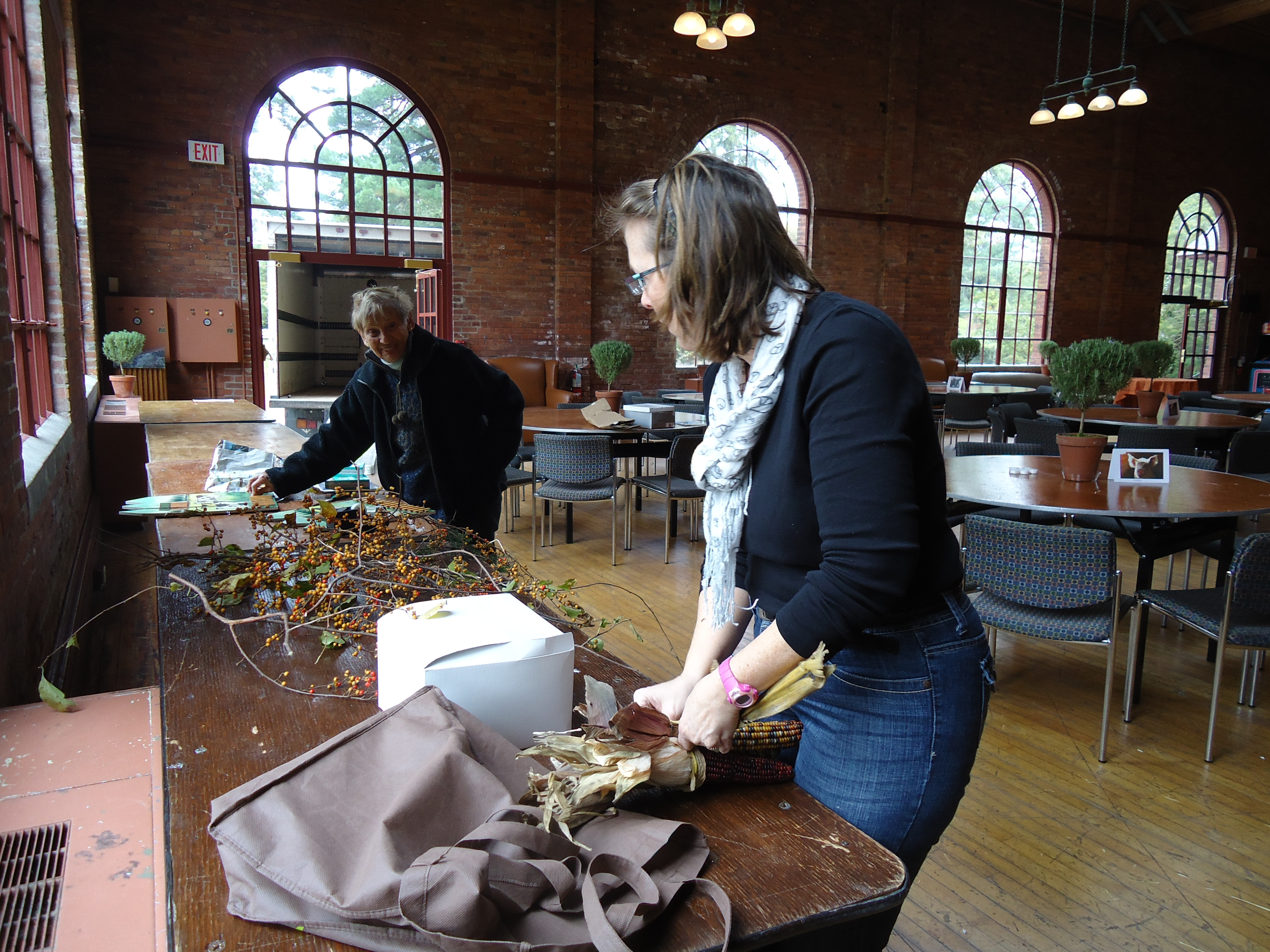
Preparations for an event in the Aula

Ely Hall is the home of Vassar's Earth Science and Geography Department. The A. Scott Warthin Jr. Museum of Geology and Natural History resides on the building's first floor, showcasing a collection of fossils, rocks, minerals, and scientific equipment collected over the entirety of Vassar's history. The Museum is free and open on weekdays during the academic year from 9 am until 5 pm. Ely also hosts several laboratories, dedicated to the study of earth materials, paleoclimatology, clastic sedimentology, and geophysics. Within Ely, there are also classrooms, a GIS laboratory, and a map collection.

The Aula is one of Vassar's most frequently used spaces. In addition to housing campus events including art shows, conventions, and performances, the Aula is used for communitywide events.
