= Milo Parker Jewett =

American academic (1808–1882)

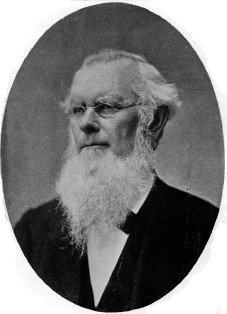
- Jewett circa 1860-1870

1st President of Vassar College
- In office 1861–1864
- Succeeded by: John Howard Raymond

1st President of Judson College
- In office 1838–1855
- Succeeded by: Archibald John Battle

Personal details
- Born: 27 April 1808 St. Johnsbury, Vermont, U.S.
- Died: 9 June 1882 (aged 74) Milwaukee, Wisconsin, U.S.
- Education: Dartmouth College; Andover Theological Seminary
- Profession: Educator, college president

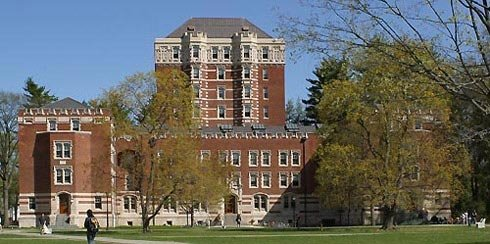
Jewett House, Vassar College, designed by Prof. Lewis Pitcher of Vassar College and the firm of Pitcher & Tachau

Milo Parker Jewett (27 April 1808 – 9 June 1882) was an American author and college president. He was the first president of Vassar College and first president of Judson College, holding the office from 1861 to 1864, and 1838 to 1855, respectively.

== Biography ==
Born in St. Johnsbury, Vermont, on 27 April 1808, Jewett was a graduate of Dartmouth College (1828) and Andover Theological Seminary (1833). He became a professor of rhetoric and political economy Marietta College, resigning in 1838 after adopting Baptist tenets.

He founded Judson College in 1838 and served as president until 1855. He established Vassar College with Matthew Vassar in February 1861, serving as president until 1864, when he resigned from office following a disagreement with Vassar.

In 1867 he moved to Milwaukee, Wisconsin, where he died on 9 June 1882.

== Legacy ==
The Milo Jewett House at Vassar is named after him in honor of both his promotion of female education and his service to the college. Jewett Hall, the principal building on the Judson College campus, was also named for him.

== Publications ==
- Baptism (1840)
- Education in Europe (1863)
- Relations of Boards of Health and Intemperance (1874)
- The Model Academy (1875)
