= John Howard Raymond =

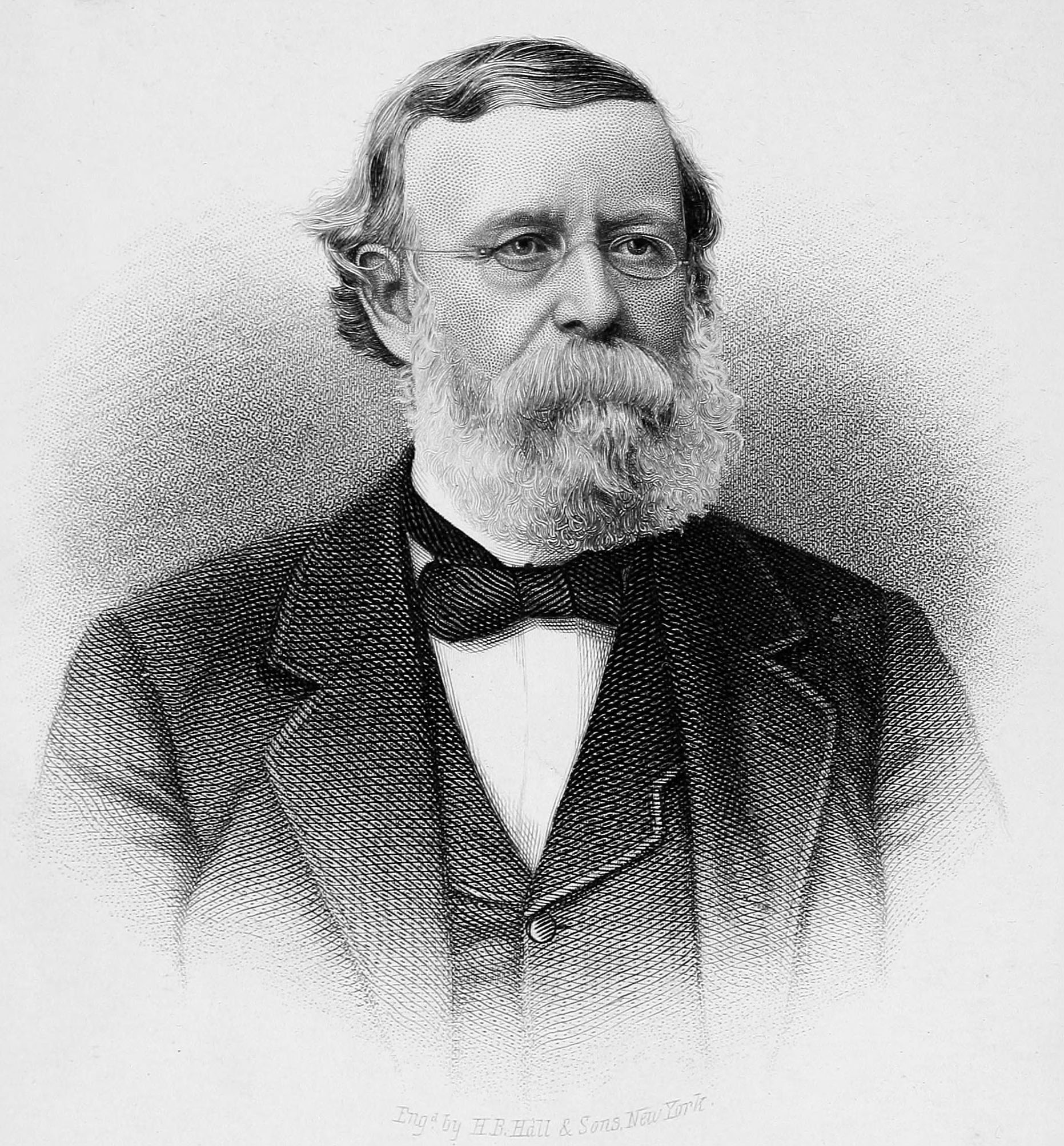

2nd President of Vassar College
- In office 1864 – August 14, 1878
- Preceded by: Milo Parker Jewett
- Succeeded by: Samuel L. Caldwell

Personal details
- Born: March 7, 1814 Manhattan, New York City
- Died: August 14, 1878 (aged 64) Poughkeepsie, New York
- Occupation: Educator, college president
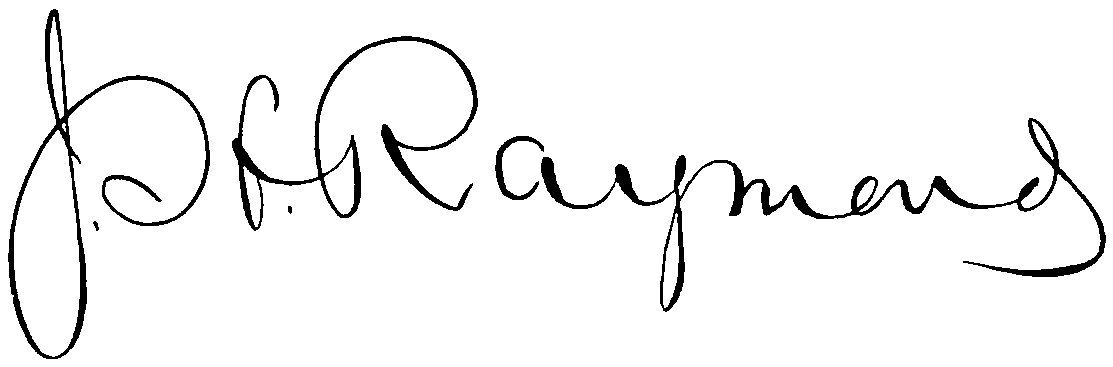
- Signature

John Howard Raymond (March 7, 1814 – August 14, 1878) was an American educator. He was the first president of the Polytechnic Institute of New York University, and, as president and professor, also lent his hand to organizing Vassar College in its early years.

== Biography ==
He was born on March 7, 1814, in Manhattan, New York City.

He was a student at Columbia, which he entered at age 14. As a student at Columbia, he was top ranked for some time, but his performance eventually became such that he was expelled. He finally graduated at Union College in 1832. Immediately thereafter he entered upon the study of the law in New Haven. His religious inclinations led him to abandon this pursuit, and in 1834 he entered the theological seminary at Hamilton, New York, with the intention of preparing for the Baptist ministry. His progress in the study of Hebrew was so marked that before his graduation he was appointed a tutor in that language.

In 1839 he was raised to the chair of rhetoric and English literature at the seminary, which in 1846 changed its name to Madison University, and later (1890) took the name Colgate University. During his ten years as a professor there, he enjoyed a constantly growing reputation as a teacher and orator. In 1850 he accepted the professorship of belles-lettres in the newly established University of Rochester.

In 1856 he was selected to organize the Collegiate and Polytechnic Institute in Brooklyn, and accomplished the task with great success. He joined the first board of trustees for Vassar College of Poughkeepsie, New York, in 1861, and was raised to the presidency there in 1865 to again apply his organizational skills. He was also professor of mental and moral philosophy at Vassar. His varied gifts and accomplishments found scope for their highest exercise in these roles. He had accepted the presidency at Vassar despite his recent resignation from the Polytechnic presidency due to health concerns.

He died on August 14, 1878, in Poughkeepsie, New York.

== Legacy ==
Though an able and eloquent preacher, ministering regularly as chaplain of the college, he was never ordained. His published works were confined to pamphlets and sermons. He received the honorary degree of LL. D. His Life and Letters were published in New York in 1880.

== Family ==
His nephew Rossiter Worthington Raymond was a noted mining engineer and writer.
