= Vogelstein Center for Drama and Film =

Academic building at Vassar College

Coordinates: 41.6856°N 73.8942°W

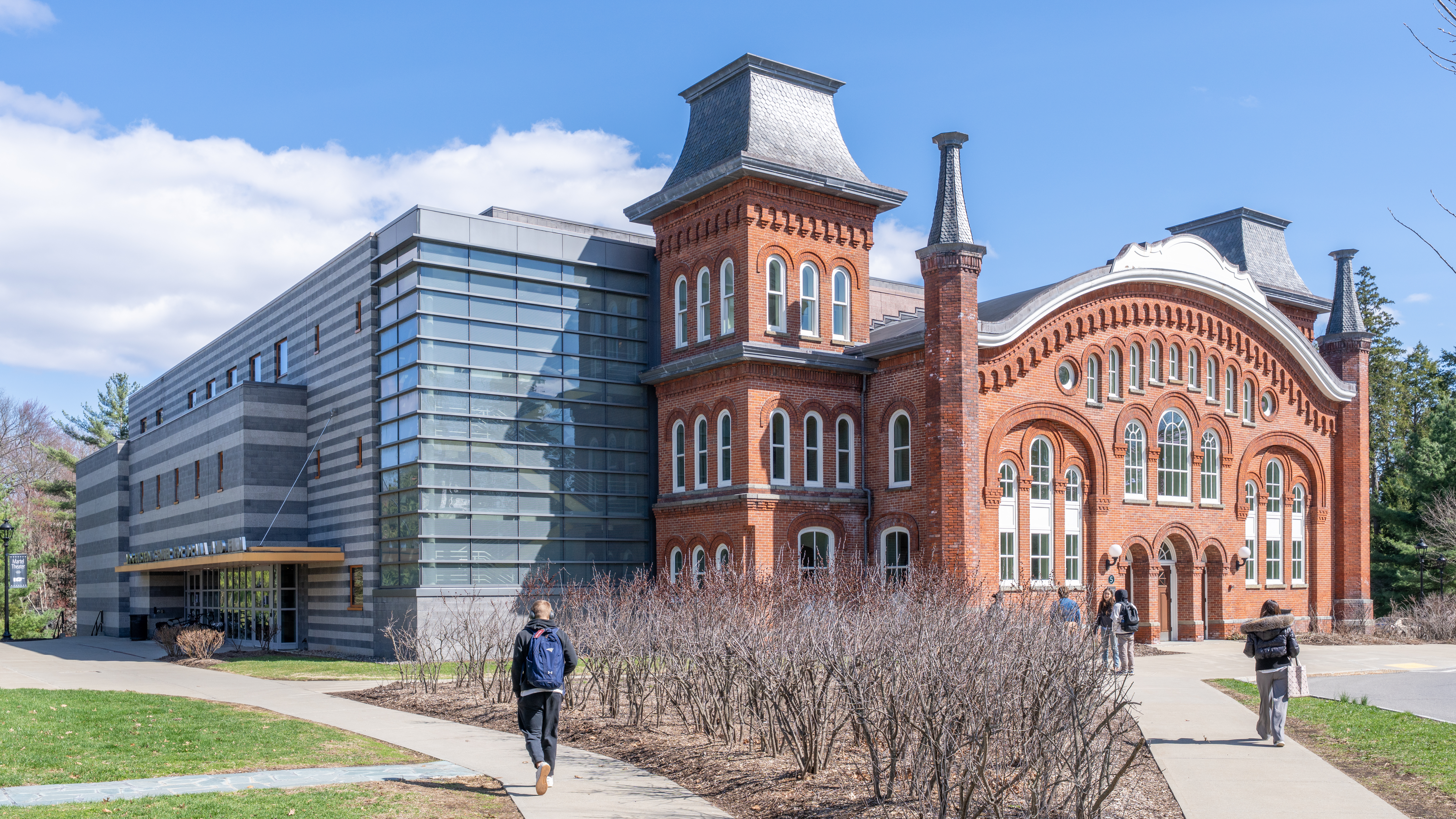
The Vogelstein Center for Drama and Film in 2026, with the preserved Avery Hall façade on the right.

The Vogelstein Center for Drama and Film is an academic building on the campus of Vassar College in Poughkeepsie, New York. It houses the college's Departments of Drama and Film and serves as the primary venue for theatrical productions, film studies, and related academic programs.

Originally constructed in 1866 as the Calisthenium and Riding Academy, the building was designed by architect J.A. Wood. It initially provided indoor space for horseback riding and physical education, reflecting the college's early emphasis on women's physical training.

Following the end of its use as a riding academy, the building was converted for academic purposes and became known as Avery Hall. Throughout the twentieth century it accommodated classrooms, studios, and offices for a variety of academic departments before becoming the home of the drama program.

In 2003 the structure underwent a major renovation and expansion designed by architect César Pelli. The project preserved the historic stone façade of Avery Hall while adding a modern performance and teaching facility behind it. Following the renovation, the building was renamed the Vogelstein Center for Drama and Film in recognition of support from the Vogelstein family.

The center includes:

- the Martel Theater, the college's principal proscenium performance space;
- the Susan Stein Shiva Theater, a flexible black-box theatre;
- classrooms and rehearsal studios;
- costume, scene, and lighting shops;
- editing suites and film production facilities; and
- faculty offices for the Drama and Film departments.

The Vogelstein Center hosts student and faculty productions throughout the academic year and supports Vassar's undergraduate programs in drama, film, and related performing arts disciplines.

== History ==
- 1866 – Constructed as the Calisthenium and Riding Academy.
- Early 20th century – Converted for academic use and renamed Avery Hall.
- 2003 – Renovated and expanded by César Pelli, becoming the Vogelstein Center for Drama and Film.

== See also ==
- Vassar College
- César Pelli
