= Wythe =

Vertical layer of masonry units

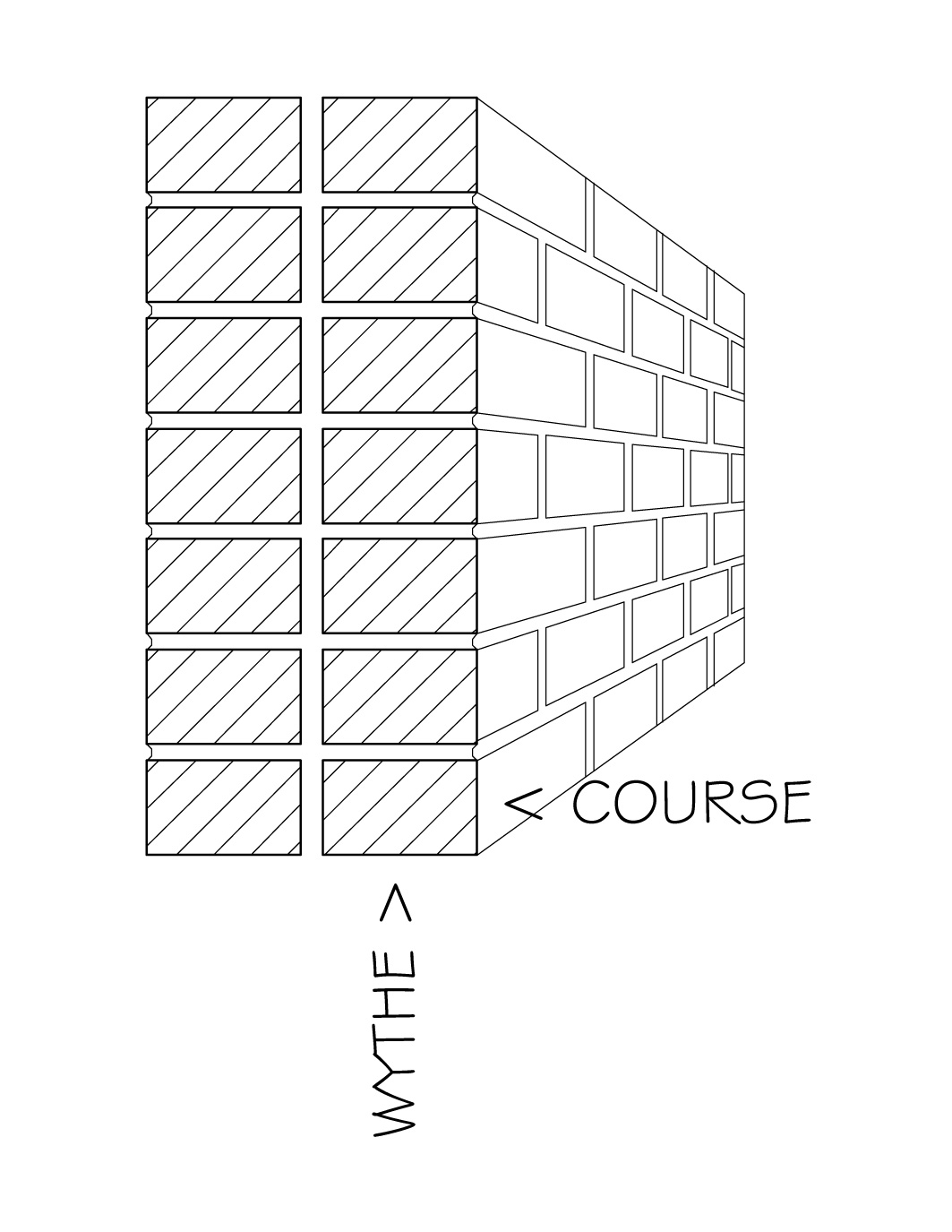
Masonry terminology, including a wythe

A wythe is a continuous vertical layer of masonry one masonry unit thick. Adjacent wythes may be designed to resist loads individually or connected so that they act together as one structural member. A facing wythe of brick or other masonry whose strength is not counted as part of the supporting wall is a masonry veneer.

A multiple-wythe wall may use the same masonry material for both wythes, or combine different materials, such as clay brick facing with concrete masonry backing. In a veneer wall, the backing provides structural support while the facing provides the architectural finish.

The term leaf is used in Eurocode 6. In its 2005 edition, a single-leaf wall has neither a cavity nor a continuous vertical joint within the plane of the wall. A double-leaf wall has two parallel leaves connected by wall ties and a mortar-filled longitudinal joint, allowing them to act together under load. The same edition also describes veneer walls in which one leaf does not contribute to the strength or stiffness of the other.

== See also ==
- Course (architecture) – Architecture term for a layer of the same unit running horizontally in a wall
