= Strong House (Vassar College) =

Coordinates: 41.6886°N 73.8962°W

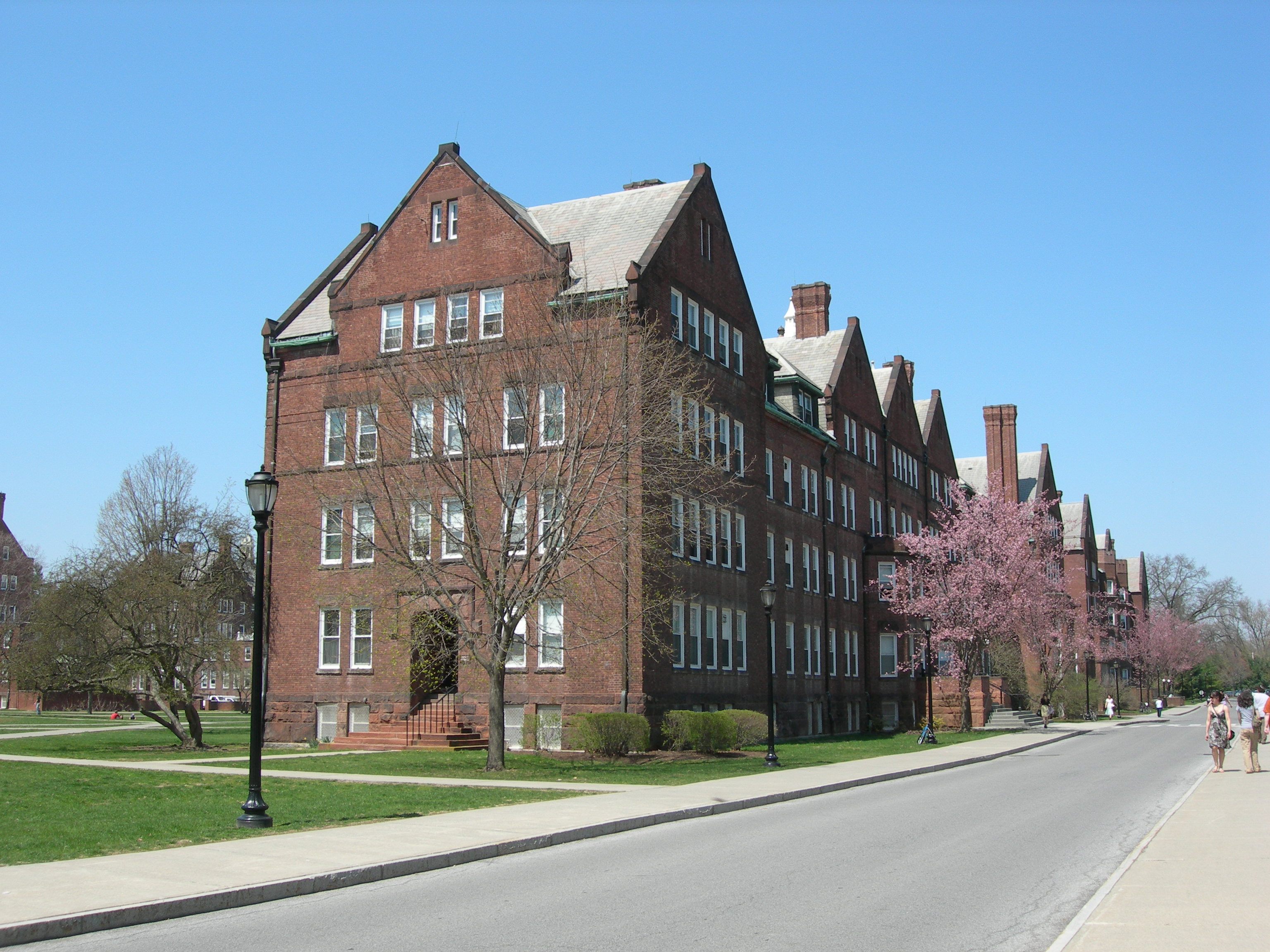
Strong House

Strong House (originally Strong Hall) is a dormitory at Vassar College named after Bessie Rockefeller Strong, the oldest daughter of oil tycoon John D. Rockefeller, who was largely responsible for funding the building's construction. It used to be the only all female dormitory remaining after Vassar went coeducational in 1969. However, Strong House currently identifies as a gender inclusive dorm. The building was designed by Francis R. Allen and was completed in 1893.

It is located at Vassar College, in Poughkeepsie, New York.
