= Main Building (Vassar College) =

Historic building in Poughkeepsie, New York

- Main Building, Vassar College
- U.S. National Register of Historic Places
- U.S. National Historic Landmark
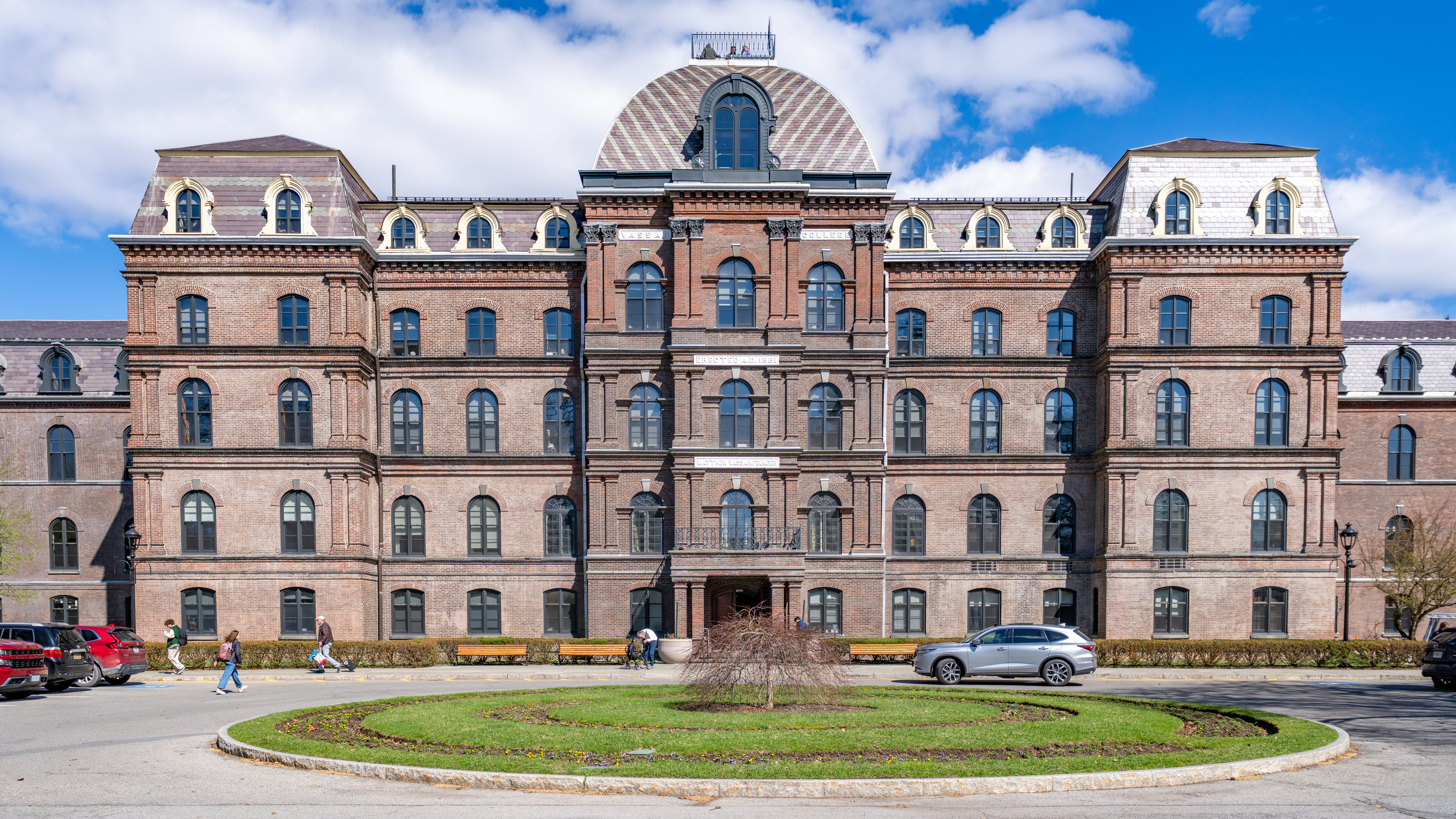
- Seen from Main Campus Dr (2026)

- Location within New York Location within the United States
- Location: Poughkeepsie, New York
- Coordinates: 41°41′12.03″N 73°53′44.99″W
- Area: 4 acres (1.6 ha) (landmarked area)
- Built: 1861
- Architect: James Renwick Jr.
- Architectural style: Second Empire
- NRHP reference No.: 73001183

Significant dates
- Added to NRHP: September 19, 1973
- Designated NHL: June 24, 1986

The Main Building of Vassar College is the oldest surviving building on its campus in Poughkeepsie, New York, and the center of academic life. It was built by James Renwick Jr. in the Second Empire style in 1861, the second building in the history of what was one of America's first women's colleges. It is one of the earliest, largest, and most important examples of Second Empire architecture in the United States and is a National Historic Landmark for its architecture and educational significance. At the time of its completion, the structure contained the most interior space of any building in the United States, and housed the entire college, including dormitories, libraries, classrooms, and dining halls. Currently, the first and second floors house campus administration while the remaining three (including the second floor wings) house student rooms.

== Architecture ==
Vassar's Main Building is a large brick building, four stories in height, with a fifth floor under its mansard roof. It is U-shaped, with a central portion 500 feet (150 m) long, and transverse wings 164 feet (50 m) in length projecting forward at the ends of the central section. At the center of the central portion is a projecting pavilion topped by a slate-roofed dome with iron cresting. Most windows are sash, set in openings with either segmented-arch or round-arch tops; the roof is pierced by dormers whose rounded tops have keystones. Window trim and horizontal banding on the building are of bluestone.

The building has in significant part been restored to its original appearance. One notable exception is a large turning staircase in the central section, which was removed in 1893 as part of a library expansion that became known as "Uncle Fred's Nose", after Fred Thompson, whose name adorned the annex that was added at that time. That annex was removed in 1959 during the restoration process, but the stairs were not rebuilt.

== History ==
It was taken over by protesters in 1969 and again in 1990.

It was named a National Historic Landmark in 1986. The Vassar Observatory, the first building built on the Vassar campus, is also a National Historic Landmark.

== See also ==
- List of National Historic Landmarks in New York
- National Register of Historic Places listings in Poughkeepsie, New York
