= 369th Regiment =

369th Regiment may refer to:

- 369th Infantry Regiment (United States)
- 369th Croatian Reinforced Infantry Regiment
- 369th Regiment Armory

== See also ==
- Harlem's Rattlers and the Great War
- 369th (disambiguation)
