= 369th Division =

369th Division may refer to:

- 369th (Croatian) Infantry Division, Wehrmacht, Germany
- 369th Rifle Division, Soviet Union

== See also ==
- List of military divisions by number
- 369th (disambiguation)
