= Tachau and Vought =

Tachau and Vought was an American architectural firm active in the mid-twentieth-century New York City that specialized in mental hygiene hospitals. It was established in 1919 as the successor to the architectural firm of Pilcher and Tachau by William G. Tachau (b. 1875) and Vought. By 1946, Vought had left. Eliot Butler Willauer (April 4, 1912 – February 6, 1972) was a principal from around 1945 until 1946. The firm moved from 109 Lexington Avenue to 102 East 30th Street around 1923.

Like many New York architectural firms active during the Great Depression, Tachau & Vought worked in "almost continuous employment on Federal, State or City work," which included its inclusion on Mayor Fiorello La Guardia's list of architects since the compendium's inception on. "From 1918...[the firm] specialized in mental hygiene hospitals."

== Works ==
- Louisville Free Public Library (1906, designed as the firm Pilcher and Tachau), Louisville, Kentucky for $300,000
- Temple Israel, New York City for $287,700
- Jewett House (1907, formerly North Residence from 1915, designed as the firm Pilcher and Tachau) of Vassar College, Poughkeepsie, New York built for $280,000.
- Squadron C Armory (or Company C Armory), Brooklyn, New York built for $500,000
- Central Islip Hospital in Central Islip, New York built for $900,000
- 8th Regiment Armory, New York City, built for $1,500,000
- Utica State Hospital in Utica, New York built for $600,000
- Psychiatric Pavilion, Brooklyn, New York, built for $1,650,000
- The “medieval-inspired drill shed” of the 369th Regiment Armory, 2360 Fifth Avenue (18-42 West 143rd Street and 17-44 West 142nd Street), New York City, a two-story fireproof drill shed for troops (1920–1924) for $300,000.00 (filed in 1921)
- Naumburg Bandshell, Central Park, Concert Ground of Mall, Indiana limestone and cast-stone (1923) for $125,000. The structure, an innovative and novel neo-classical half-dome design on a high section of drum, later came into frequent use due to its inherently good and responsive acoustical qualities.
- The U.S. Marine Hospital (Stapleton, Staten Island) (1933–36, with Kenneth Murchison and William H. Gompert), built for $2,266,000
- Freeport Post Office (designed with William Gropper in the Colonial Revival style), 132 Merrick Road, Freeport, New York (added 1989 to the National Register of Historic Places)
- 4781-4789 Broadway (1948), a two-story brick library, built for $285,000.00
