= Natural American Spirit =

American cigarette brand

- Product type: Cigarette; Roll-your-own tobacco
- Current owner: Santa Fe Natural Tobacco Company
- Country: United States
- Introduced: 1982; 44 years ago
- Markets: Worldwide
- Website: www.americanspirit.com

Natural American Spirit, often referred to simply as American Spirit, is an American brand of cigarettes and other tobacco products. It is manufactured by the Santa Fe Natural Tobacco Company, a subsidiary of Reynolds American which itself is owned by British American Tobacco. Outside of the United States it is marketed by Japan Tobacco.

== History ==
The company was founded in 1982 by Bill Drake, author of The Cultivator's Handbook of Natural Tobacco; Robert Marion, an acupuncture student at the Kototama Institute in Santa Fe; and Chris Webster, a Santa Fe entrepreneur and realtor. Startup investments came from Edward Wikes, a Santa Fe plumber/contractor who took out a loan to support the venture; Robert Wolf, an oil rig roughneck; and Philip Naumburg, an heir to the Elkan Naumburg fortune. In January 2002, the company was acquired by Reynolds American and is now a wholly owned independent subsidiary of Reynolds American, which is in turn owned by British American Tobacco. Japan Tobacco announced in September 2015 that it acquired the right to sell Natural American Spirit products in markets outside the United States.

== Markets ==
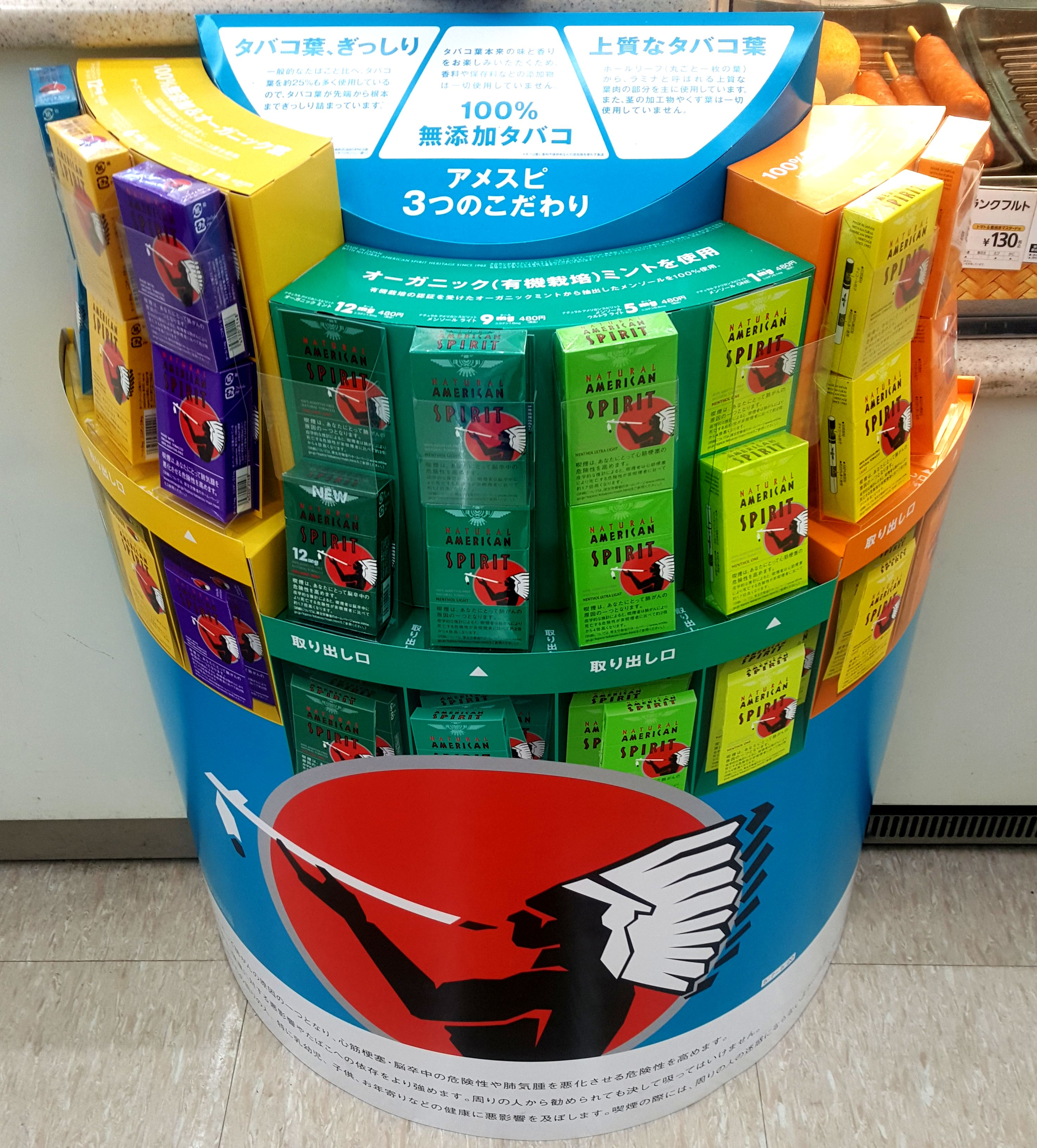
Display of Natural American Spirit in Japan in 2018

Natural American Spirit cigarettes have been sold in the United States, Mexico, Canada, Netherlands, Brazil, United Kingdom, Germany, Austria, Switzerland, Tunisia, Japan, Spain, Italy, France, Finland and Denmark.

== Products ==
Natural American Spirit offers various types of select filter cigarettes which are color-coded to denote the nicotine and tar contents, which are altered by using different filters and cigarette paper. American Spirit also has a Perique Blend Filter cigarette, which contains 10% Perique tobacco, and an Organic Filter cigarette, which contains organic tobacco.

Natural American Spirit also offers several "Roll Your Own" tobaccos in tins and pouches.

In the UK, American Spirit rolling tobacco comes in Blue (regular) or Yellow (light).

American Spirit cigarettes are sold in packs of 20, or 14 in Japan. They come as follows:

- Orange – Smooth Mellow Original Taste
- Yellow – Original Blend Mellow Original Taste
- Blue – Original Blend Full-bodied Taste
- Light Green – Organic Mellow Menthol
- Dark Green – Organic Full-Bodied Menthol
- Gold – Organic Mellow Taste
- Turquoise – Organic Full-Bodied Taste
- Black – Perique Rich Robust Taste
- Red – Full-Bodied Taste
- Dark Blue – U.S. Grown Premium Full-Bodied Taste
- Tan – U.S. Grown Premium Mellow Taste
- Sky – Smooth Taste, charcoal filter
- Celadon Green – Unique Balanced Taste
- Hunter Green – Full-Bodied Balanced Taste
- Gray – Perique Rich Taste
- Agate (Japan Only) – Rich Sweet Taste
- Brown – Unique Non-Filtered

== Controversies ==
=== The claim of additive-free cigarettes ===
Natural American Spirit products in the year 2000 were advertised as "100% Additive-Free Tobacco".

California Attorney General Jerry Brown announced on March 1, 2010, that his office had secured an agreement with the Santa Fe Natural Tobacco Company to clearly disclose that its organic tobacco is "no safer or healthier" than other tobacco products. Attorneys general from 32 other states and the District of Columbia signed onto the agreement.

=== Use of Native American imagery ===
The use of Native American/American Indian imagery by the brand, such as the depiction of an Indigenous person on the package and the use of fake folktales, has been criticized as cultural appropriation and promoting stereotypes. Research found that the use of this imagery led to many smokers, including Indigenous peoples, having the misperception that the brand was owned or operated by a tribe/on tribal land and that it was more "natural" and thus healthier. In response, Robin Sommers, the CEO and majority owner of Santa Fe Natural Tobacco Company, stated that "Native Americans are not a target market for American Spirit", stating that the use of this imagery was due to the company's goal to bring tobacco usage more in line with a perceived "moderation" by Indigenous peoples in the 15th century and that proceeds from sales support Native communities.

== See also ==
- Health effects of tobacco
- Tobacco politics
- Tobacco smoking
