= Santa Fe Natural Tobacco Company =

American tobacco manufacturing company

- Type: Private (1982–2002); Subsidiary (2002–)
- Industry: Tobacco
- Founded: 1982; 44 years ago
- Founder: Bill Drake
- Products: Cigarettes
- Parent: Reynolds American
- Website: sfntc.com

Santa Fe Natural Tobacco Company (SFNTC) is an American tobacco manufacturing company based in Oxford, North Carolina, best known for its production of the Natural American Spirit cigarette brand.

Founded in 1982, SFNTC became a subsidiary of R. J. Reynolds when it acquired the company in 2002. Since 2004, Santa Fe Natural is part of the Reynolds American companies holding. Japan Tobacco International sells American Spirits outside of the U.S.

== History ==
Santa Fe Natural Tobacco Company was founded in 1982 by Bill Drake, who had published The Cultivator's Handbook of Marijuana, Robert Marion, an acupuncture student at the Kototama Institute in Santa Fe, and Chris Webster, a Santa Fe entrepreneur and Realtor. Drake had written his second book, The Cultivator's Handbook of Natural Tobacco, and began cultivating a strain of Nicotiana rustica a friend had found on the San Juan Pueblo. The men began mixing surplus bulk leaf tobacco from North Carolina and wild-grown rustica in the basement of Marion's rented house. Startup investments came from Edward Wikes, a plumbing contractor, Robert Wolf, an oil rig roughneck, and Philip Naumburg, an heir to the Elkan Naumburg fortune. Drake purchased a Thomas Nast caricature of a Native American chief smoking a volcano for $250 and began using it as the company logo.

After discovering Drake and Marion had been wasting funds on their "alternative lifestyle", the board of directors and company investors took control of the company. Wolf became the company's president and began marketing the product to retail outlets on Indian reservations. The company moved into the basement of the Gross, Kelly and Company historic adobe warehouse building in the Santa Fe Railyard.

In 1986, the company's board of directors hired Robin Sommers, a graduate of the Wharton School of the University of Pennsylvania who had been a subscription data specialist for Newsweek and Esquire in Greenwich Village before briefly running the Ice Palace nightclub on Fire Island. Sommers, who had paid for one of Drake's experimental tobacco crops in 1981, implemented a direct-to-consumer advertising strategy, beginning by targeting New Age readers with coupon advertisements in the East West Journal, Rolling Stone, and the Utne Reader. Sommers commissioned a New York City graphic artist to design a new Art Deco logo. In 1987, the company made $88,000 in sales.

After 1994 congressional hearings, Big Tobacco publicly released a 599-item list of additives in cigarettes. Whole Foods Market and natural food stores began carrying American Spirit. Sommers, who had become Chief Executive Officer, insisted in contracts with wholesalers on premium pricing for his cigarettes, explaining "I didn't want them going to 7-Elevens." Sommers moved the company from the railyard warehouse to Santa Fe's White Swan building located on Cerrillos Road. Santa Fe Natural Tobacco Company agreed to add "Natural" to its product name after being sued by American Tobacco for trademark infringement. Natural American Spirit became popular with celebrities, with Sean Penn, Joni Mitchell, and Gwyneth Paltrow praising the cigarette in magazine interviews and Mac Miller having the company logo tattooed on his chest.

In 1998, Santa Fe Natural Tobacco Company signed the Tobacco Master Settlement Agreement, where it was made to pay out less than Big Tobacco because the company was younger. In 1999, the company opened a new $4.5 million plant outside Oxford, North Carolina, using only certified organic farmers.

In 2002, R.J. Reynolds bought Santa Fe Natural Tobacco Company for $340 million. Sommers, who by then owned 42% of the company, signed a non-compete agreement and left the company. Profits rose 50% annually for the next decade. Sales of Natural American Spirit increased 86% from 2009 to 2014.

In 2015, the Food and Drug Administration sent the company a letter warning that "natural" and "additive-free" were false marketing of a "modified risk product".

In September 2015, Japan Tobacco International paid $5 billion for the right to manufacture and sell Natural American Spirit in Asia and Europe. Japan Tobacco has so far continued to source its leaf from Santa Fe Natural's Oxford manufacturing plant, even sending its research scientists on a North Carolina State University agricultural extension tour.

In September 2016, plaintiffs from twelve states sued Santa Fe Natural and Reynolds in the United States District Court for the District of New Mexico, seeking class action certification for consumer fraud from false labeling claims. In November 2016, a second lawsuit was filed for false advertising practices. Reynolds is represented in the litigation by Jones Day.

In September 2015, a complaint was filed against Santa Fe Natural Tobacco Co. in the U.S. District Court for the Southern District of Florida, alleging that the company's "organic and additive-free marketing claims for the Natural American Spirit brand" constituted fraud, false advertising, negligent misrepresentation, unjust enrichment, and unfair competition. Two similar complaints were filed in the U.S. District Court for the District of New Mexico on December 22, 2015. A third federal class-action lawsuit was filed against the company in January 2016 in the U.S. District Court for the Southern District of New York. The suits may be consolidated.
