= William G. Tachau =

American architect

- Born: April 1875; Louisville, Kentucky, U.S.
- Died: January 1969 (aged 93)
- Known for: Architect
- Family: Elkan Naumburg (uncle)

William Gabriel Tachau, AIA, (April 1875 – January 1969), was an American architect active in early- to mid-twentieth-century New York City. With Lewis Pilcher, he was a partner in the architectural firm of Pilcher & Tachau from 1904 to 1919 when he established the firm of Tachau & Vought. Both firms from 1918 onward specialized in mental hygiene hospitals. The firm moved from 109 Lexington Avenue to 102 East 30th Street around 1923 and remained at that address and that name even after Vought left.

== Early life and education ==
Tachau was born in April 1875 in Louisville, Kentucky where he attended high school and later designed the Louisville Library. He earned a Ph.B. from Columbia University in 1896, and a Diplome Ecoles des Beaux Arts in 1903. His uncle was banker Elkan Naumburg.

== Practice ==
He worked as a draftsman from 1896 to 1897 in the architectural firm of Lamb and Rich, as a designer for the architectural firm of Herts & Tallant in 1898, 1903 and 1904, and was briefly chief of design for Albert Kelsey in 1903. He joined Lewis Pilcher around 1904 forming Pilcher and Tachau. Like many New York architectural firms active during the Great Depression, Tachau and Vought worked in "almost continuous employment on Federal, State or City work," as they were included on Mayor Fiorello H. La Guardia's list of architects, since its inception. He practiced under the license No. 3556 in New York and No. C-250 in New Jersey, and was a member of the Society Diplome par le Government Francais and the Beaux Arts Society. Upon's Vought's departure from the firm, Eliot Butler Willauer (1912–1972) became a principal in Tachau & Vought

== Works as Pilcher & Tachau ==
- Jewett House (1907, formerly North Residence from 1915, designed as the firm Pilcher and Tachau) of Vassar College, Poughkeepsie, New York built for $280,000.
- Troop C Armory in Brooklyn, New York
- The Kingsbridge Armory in the Bronx, New York

== Works as Tachau & Vought ==
- Louisville Library, Louisville, Kentucky for $300,000
- Temple Israel, New York City for $287,700
- Squadron C Armory (or Company C Armory), Brooklyn, New York built for $500,000
- Central Islip Hospital in Central Islip, New York built for $900,000
- 8th Regiment Armory, New York City, built for $1,500,000
- Utica State Hospital in Utica, New York built for $600,000
- Psychiatric Pavilion, Brooklyn, New York, built for $1,650,000
- The "medieval-inspired drill shed" of the 369th Regiment Armory, 2360 Fifth Avenue (18-42 West 143rd Street and 17-44 West 142nd Street), New York City, a two-story fireproof drill shed for troops (1920–1924) for $300,000.00 (filed in 1921)
- Naumburg Bandshell, Central Park, Concert Ground of Mall, Indiana limestone and cast-stone (1923) for $125,000. The structure, an innovative and novel neo-classical half-dome design on a high section of drum, later came into frequent use due to its inherently good and responsive acoustical qualities., and Drawings on deposit at Avery Library Columbia University and at NYC's Public Design Commission archives.
- Apple Bee Farm Estate, for George W. Naumburg, Croton-on-Hudson, New York, (1920s). Drawings on deposit at Avery Library Columbia University
- Naumburg Family Mausoleum, Woodlawn Cemetery, Bronx, New York, early 1920s, for Elkan Naumburg (1835–1924) and subsequent relatives. Drawings on deposit at Avery Library Columbia University
- The U.S. Marine Hospital (Stapleton, Staten Island) (1933–36, with Kenneth Murchison and William H. Gompert), built for $2,266,000
- Freeport Post Office (designed with William Gropper in the Colonial Revival style), 132 Merrick Road, Freeport, New York (added 1989 to the National Register of Historic Places)
- 4781-4789 Broadway (1948), a two-story brick library, built for $285,000.00
