= Willauer =

Willauer is a surname. Notable people with the surname include:

- Eliot Butler Willauer (1912–1972), American architect
- Heather Willauer (born 1974), American chemist and inventor
- Whiting Willauer (1906–1962), American diplomat
