= Alumni Sports and Recreation Center (Armory) =

Building in Troy, New York

- Interactive map of the Alumni Sports and Recreation Center area
- Former names: 15th Street Armory
- Alternative names: Armory

General information
- Location: Troy, New York, United States
- Coordinates: 42°43′42.5″N 73°40′36″W

Design and construction
- Architect: Lewis Pilcher

The Alumni Sports and Recreation Center (more commonly referred to as The Armory) is a building owned by Rensselaer Polytechnic Institute (RPI) in Troy, New York. It is host to sports facilities and to many clubs in the institute's community. It was purchased by the institute in 1971 from the State of New York, where it had previously served as the city armory for Troy.

== History before purchase ==
Before being purchased by RPI, the building was Troy's armory. Designed by architect Lewis Pilcher, the 95,203-square-foot (8,845 m^{2}) building was constructed on a 9.67-acre (3.91 ha) site. The armory was constructed in from 1918 to 1919 as a replacement after the city's previous armory, the Ferry Street armory, constructed in years 1884-1886, was destroyed in a fire in 1917.

== Units under it while still Troy's armory ==
- 2nd Infantry Regiment: 1918 - 1920
- 105th Infantry Regiment: 1921 - ????
- CC "A", Headquarters and Headquarters Company, Co. A, 205th Artillery: 1961 - 1971

== Purchase by Rensselaer Polytechnic Institute ==
RPI first attempted to purchase the armory and land adjacent to it in 1944, as the institute was in urgent need of training space for the Naval Reserve Officers Training Corps (NROTC). The proposal was declined, and RPI was not able to purchase the armory at that point; however, the institute was successful in negotiating an agreement with the Adjutant General for joint use of the armory on a temporary rental basis. This rental agreement persisted until 1951, when the Houston Field House was equipped for NROTC drills, and rental of the armory was no longer necessary.

RPI made another attempt to negotiate a deal to purchase the armory in 1955. At this point, the armory and adjacent land on the property became a key factor in the expansion plan of the institute, and was viewed as a vital acquisition. As part of the institute's plan to negotiate this purchase, RPI purchased 50 acres (20 ha) of land on Oakwood Avenue. The institute had in mind that this land could be the site of a new armory for the city. This purchase was made as the institute's plan was contingent on provision for a new armory building; however, it hinged on federal appropriation for new armories. The institute was forced to put its plans of purchase on hold in 1957, as there was no federal appropriation to come in those years.

1970 was the year the institute managed to finalize an agreement with New York State to purchase the armory as well as 9 acres (3.6 ha) of land between 15th Street and Burdett Avenue. In exchange for the property and the land, part of the deal was for RPI to contribute $1.6 million and 20 acres (8.1 ha) of land in East Greenbush for a new armory. The New York National Guard would construct Troy's current armory, the Glenmore Road Armory, in 1970 and 1971 as a result of this deal. In 1971, the 15th Street Armory officially came under RPI's ownership.

== Renovation under Rensselaer ==
Under RPI's president at the time, Richard J. Grosh, the 15th Street Armory was renovated into a modern sports and recreation center.

Rensselaer's alumni association pledged the funds to install the building's synthetic rubber flooring in its gymnasium, and in 1973 the building was named the Alumni Sports and Recreation Center. Extensive renovations were made possible by Ellis Robinson, who made a gift to the institute in 1973. Robinson additionally funded the eight-lane pool, completed in 1984. Pledges by Robinson amounted to a $650,000 donation, and subsequently, both the pool and gymnasium were named in his honor.
