= Central Park Mall =

Architectural feature in New York City's Central Park

Coordinates: 40.772764°N 73.971437°W

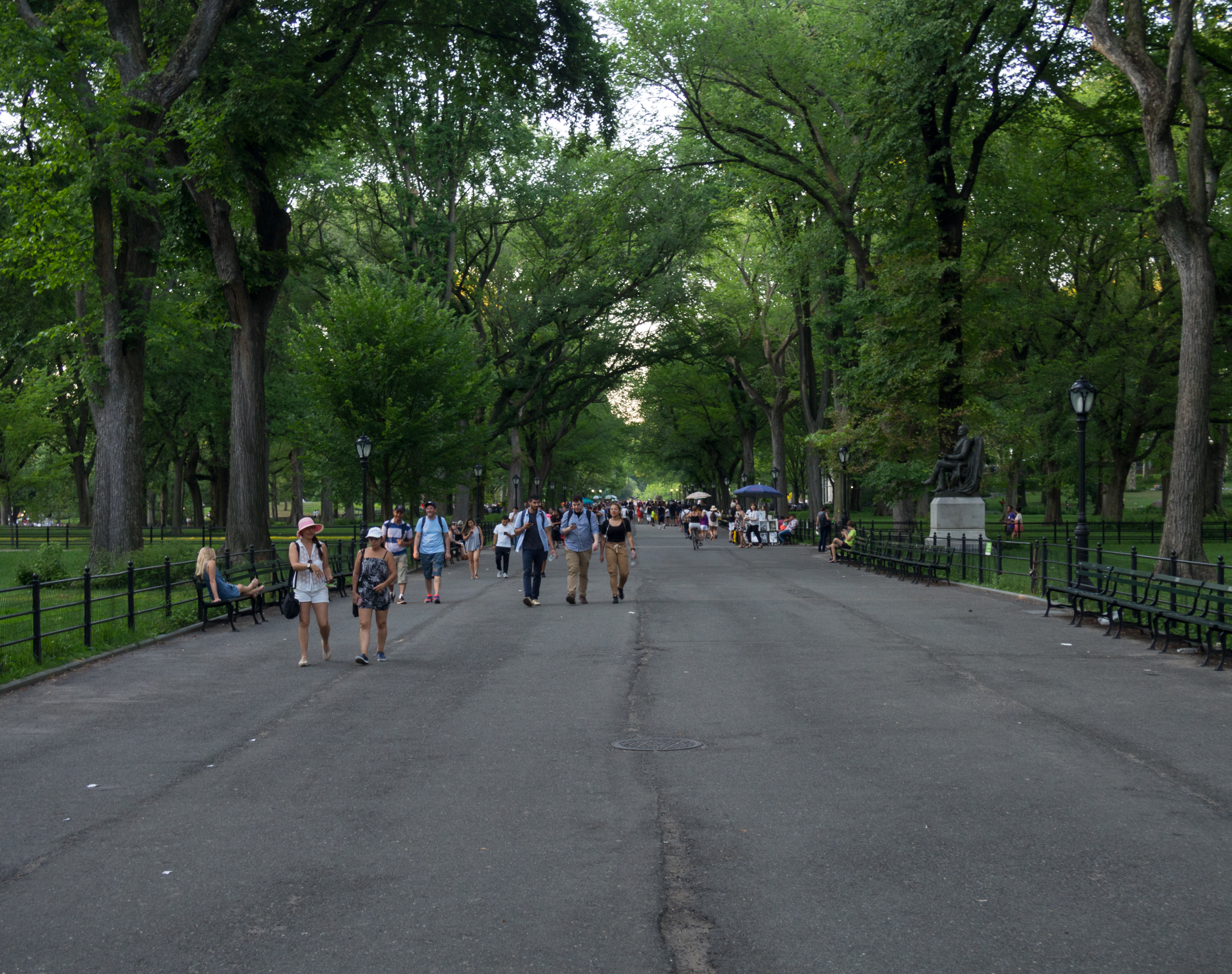
Looking north toward Bethesda Fountain

Notable buildings and structures of Central Park. Click on the map and then on the points for details.
'"`UNIQ--templatestyles-00000008-QINU`"''"`UNIQ--templatestyles-00000009-QINU`"'

The Central Park Mall is a pedestrian esplanade in Central Park, in Manhattan, New York City. The mall, leading to Bethesda Fountain, provides the only purely formal feature in the naturalistic original plan of Frederick Law Olmsted and Calvert Vaux for Central Park.

== Description ==
The Mall was designed so that a carriage could disgorge its passengers at the south end, then drive round and pick them up again overlooking Bethesda Terrace, whose view of the Lake and Ramble formed the "ultimatum of interest" in Olmsted and Vaux's vision. With no need for redoubling their steps, fashionable New Yorkers, who in the first decades of the park's existence drove through it in their carriages but rarely walked in it, had their chance to mingle with the less affluent, a mix that was considered thoroughly "American" and picturesque enough to be illustrated repeatedly in the watercolors of Maurice Prendergast and Ludwig Bemelmans.

To the east of the Mall, the wisteria pergola parallels the Mall at the top of a slope. It was originally created as a seating area for visitors attending concerts on the Mall. It now provides screening and separation from the Mall for another outdoor concert stage in New York's Central Park, Central Park SummerStage.

=== Naumburg Bandshell ===
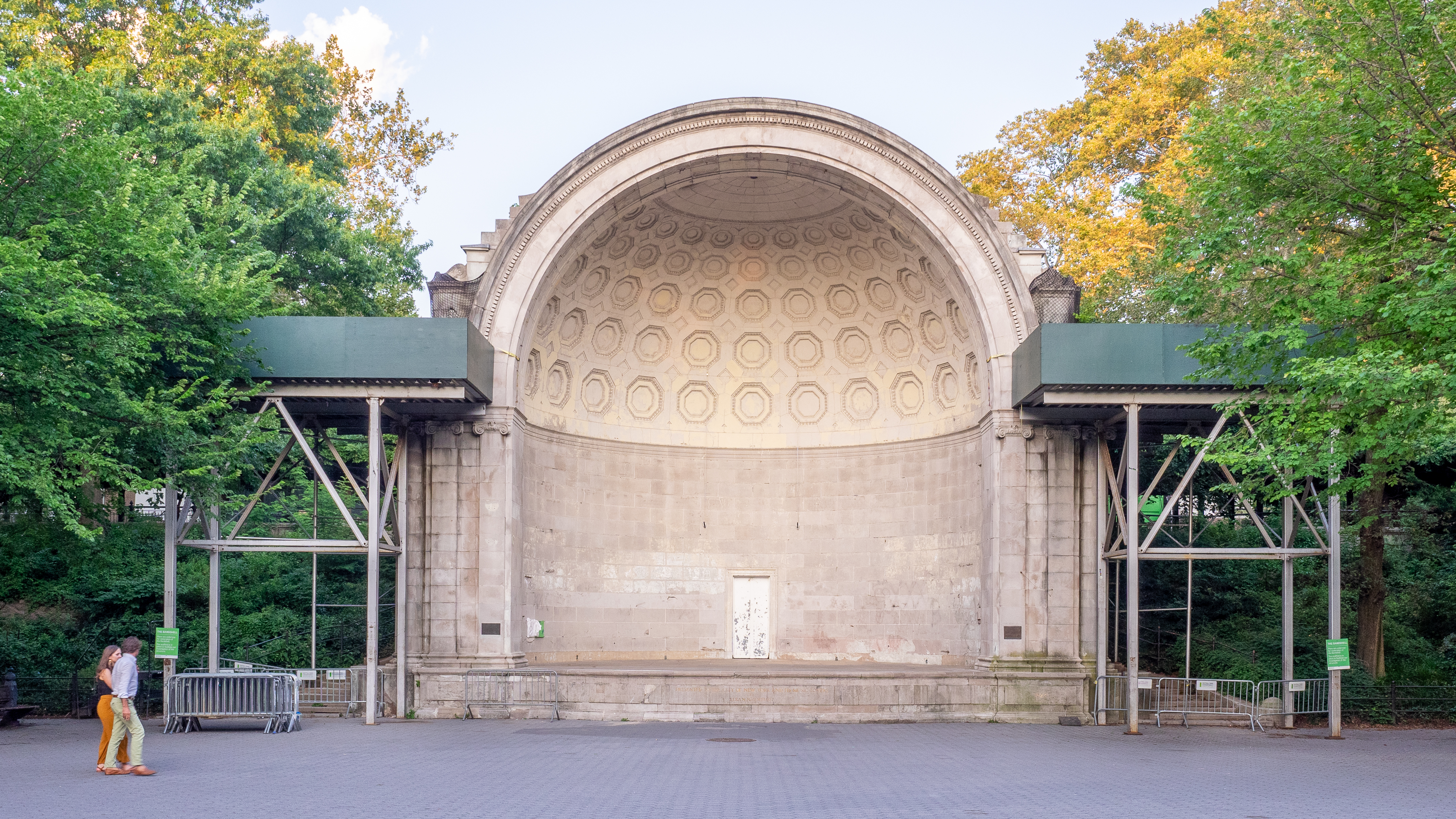
Naumburg Bandshell in 2019

Facing onto the Mall near its upper end is the neo-classical half-domed Naumburg Bandshell (designed by William G. Tachau in 1916, built 1921-23); it was named after Elkan Naumburg. It is Central Park's only neo-classical building. A "Ladies' Refreshment Salon", later called the Casino with great improvements by Joseph Urban, stood behind it. The Naumburg Orchestral Concerts, founded in 1905 and the world's oldest, continuous free outdoor classical music concert series take place there as a gift to the public, each summer.

The Naumburg Bandshell replaced Vaux's cast-iron and wooden construction of 1860, where nineteenth-century concerts evolved partly into open-air popular dances as the evenings fell. The bandstand fell into disrepair by 1912, and new designs were invited by the Parks Department at that time. The architectural firm of Carrère and Hastings made the first submission, but the proposal was rejected as blocking views west towards Sheep Meadow. Then Tachau's successful Naumburg Bandshell design was submitted for its location on the east side of the Concert Ground, centrally nestled between the two projecting scenic overlooks, and it was accepted.

The bandshell was allowed to deteriorate by NYC Parks over many years, and then was considered for demolition in 1989. A ground breaking lawsuit, brought by The Coalition to Save the Naumburg Bandshell, saved it in 1993. In early 2021, it was finally repaired by the Central Park Conservancy. This was underwritten with a special NYC funding grant for Central Park made to the C.P. Conservancy, and very generous Naumburg family funding. It reopened, after its repairs, in time for its centennial year celebrations with the Naumburg Orchestral Concerts, on June 13, 2023.

=== Rumsey Playfield ===
Rumsey Playfield, a small venue and bandshell for concerts, is located just east of the Mall. Located southwest of the intersection of Terrace and East Drives, it is operated by City Parks Foundation. Rumsey Playfield is also known as "the SummerStage" for the series of free corporate-sponsored concerts of the same name involving local and national talent that take place there every summer, and is also the site of the televised Friday morning summer concert series for the ABC morning program Good Morning America.

== History ==
The Mall, designated the "Promenade" in Olmsted and Vaux's Greensward Plan of 1857, was called the "open air hall of reception" in the text that accompanied the plan in the competition. "A 'grand promenade' was 'an essential feature of a metropolitan park', the designers acknowledged, yet its formal symmetry— like all architecture in the park— must be rendered 'subservient' to the natural 'view as the ultimatum of interest.'" Grading the Promenade and the Center Drive that swept along its western flank offering views over the Sheep Meadow was done in 1858.

By 1860, with slender elm saplings growing in turf, it was ready for the first of the open-air concerts, in Calvert Vaux's octagonal bandstand with its eight-sided bell-shaped roof. The New-York Tribune encouraged hesitant New Yorkers of the better sort: "We saw no conduct which would have been out of place or inconvenient to the most scrupulous or delicate nerves in the private garden of a gentleman." Still some preferred to hear the tunes from a little distance, in an open carriage, "without the inconvenience of descending" a contemporary Guide phrased it, and, as the park's modern historians noted, "looming over the heads of the rest of the crowd, symbolizing and reinforcing the class hierarchy Central Park was supposed to transcend". Two flanking avenues of American elms were planted to give the high-arched shady canopy that was becoming the mode for prime residential streets in affluent towns of New England, Pennsylvania and Ohio; the elms are gone from America's Elm Streets, victims of Dutch Elm disease, but the Central Park elms, isolated from contamination from neighboring elms and closely watched by the gardeners of the Central Park Conservancy, now form one of the largest remaining plantations of the trees.

Olmsted was strongly opposed to punctuating the carefully planned rural aspect of the park with statuary, but the pressure to memorialize cultural heroes has resulted in the Mall becoming a kind of "Literary Walk". The first sculpture to be sited here was in commemoration of the New York society poet Fitz-Greene Halleck, but more than half of the sculptures erected in Central Park in the nineteenth century were projects financed and promoted by ethnic associations of the more recent immigrants: "immigrant New Yorkers were emphasizing their status as 'cultivated' people by honoring leading cultural (not political or military) figures in the city's most 'cultivated' space". The statue of Christopher Columbus centered at the south end of the Mall was financed by the elite New-York Historical and Genealogical Society; however, it "could be seen as an 'ethnic' assertion by native-stock Americans who felt beleaguered in a city more and more dominated by immigrants."

== Gallery ==
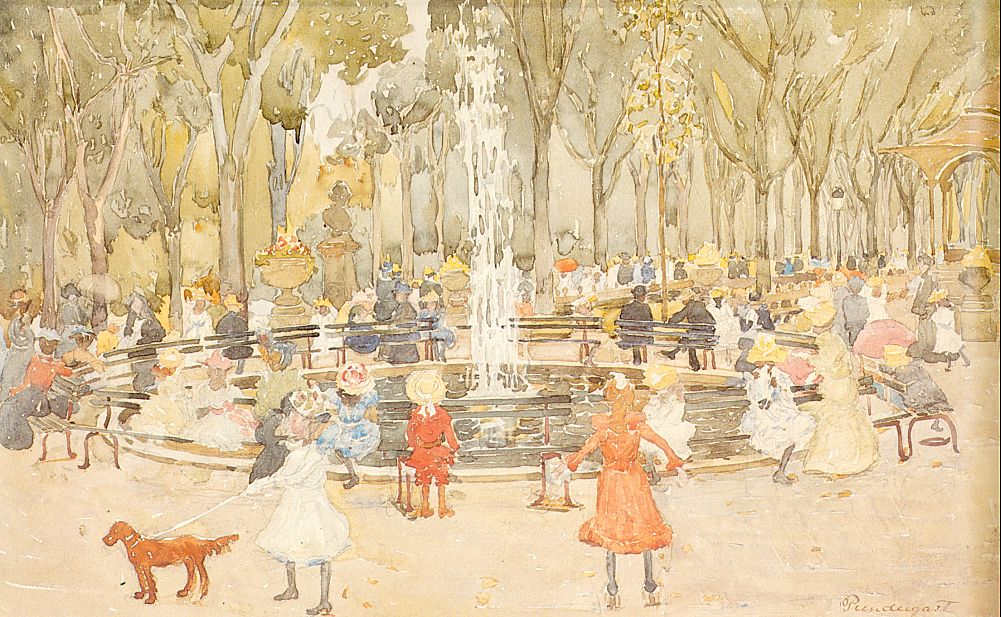
View looking up the Mall, with Vaux's original bandstand, watercolor by Maurice Prendergast, c. 1900 – c. 1903

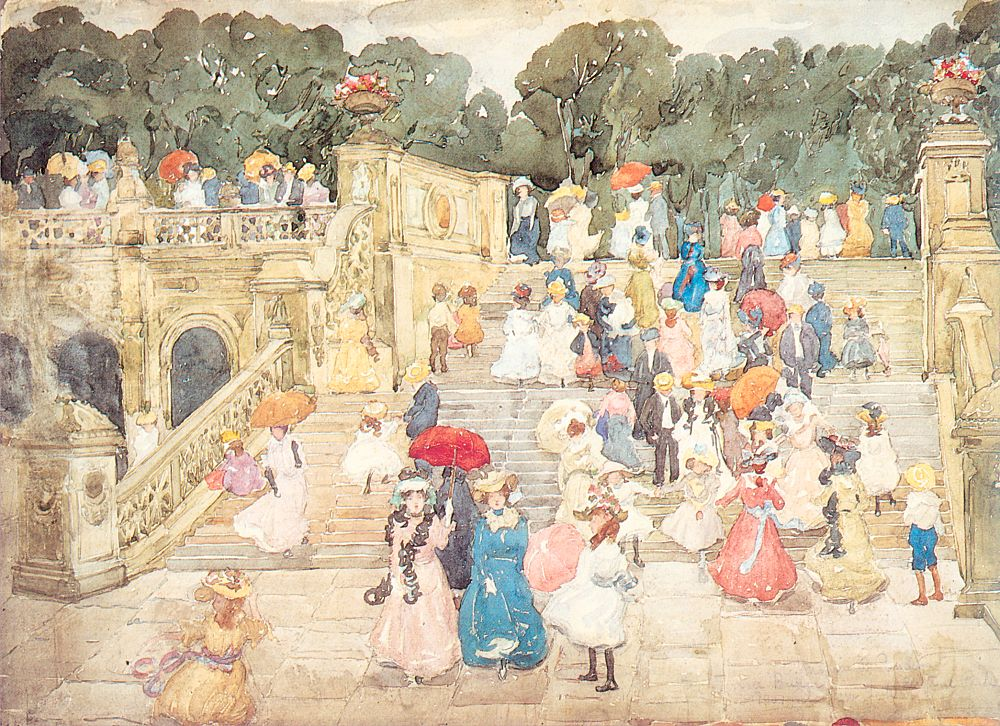
Bethesda Terrace stairs at the end of the Mall, watercolor by Maurice Prendergast, 1901

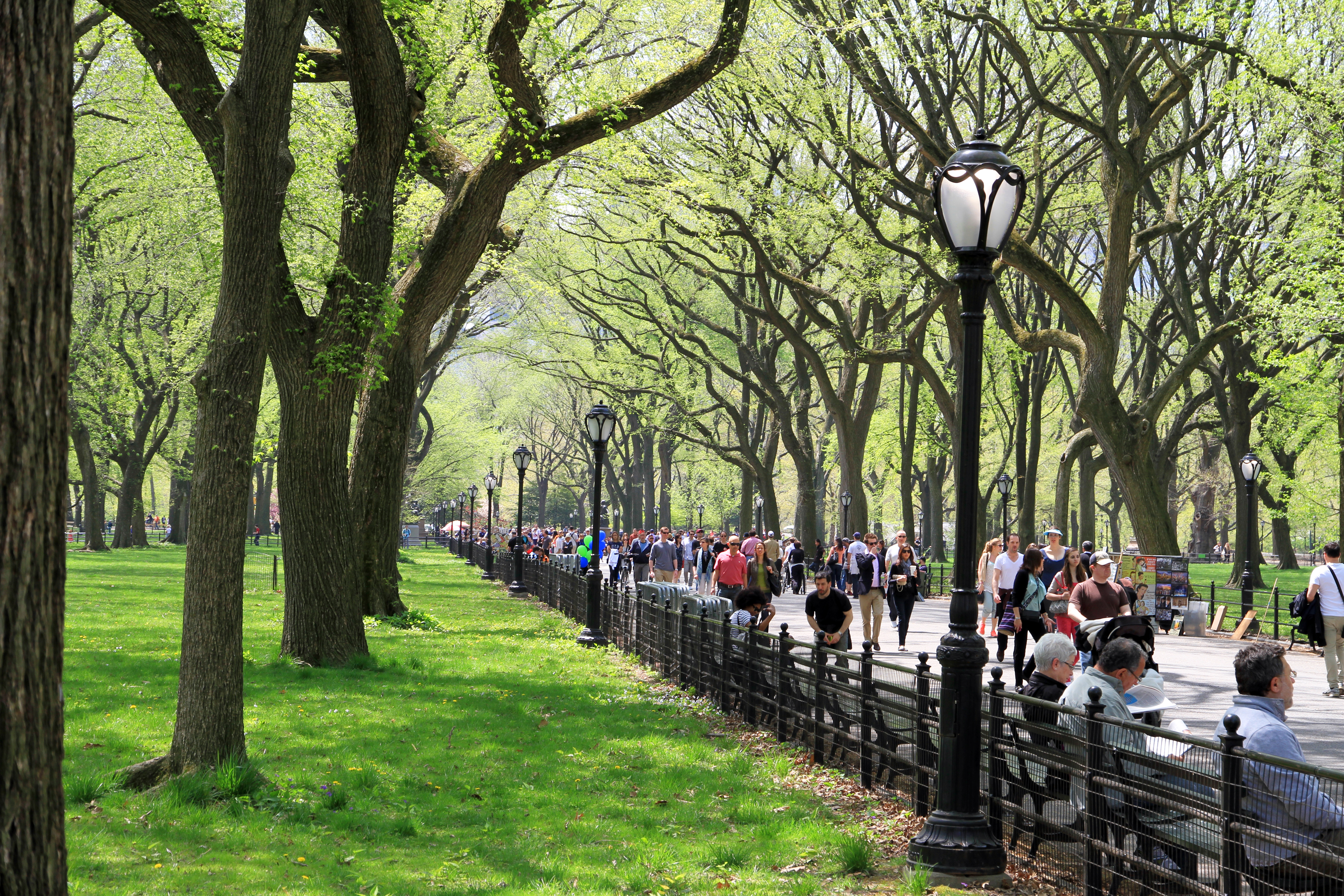

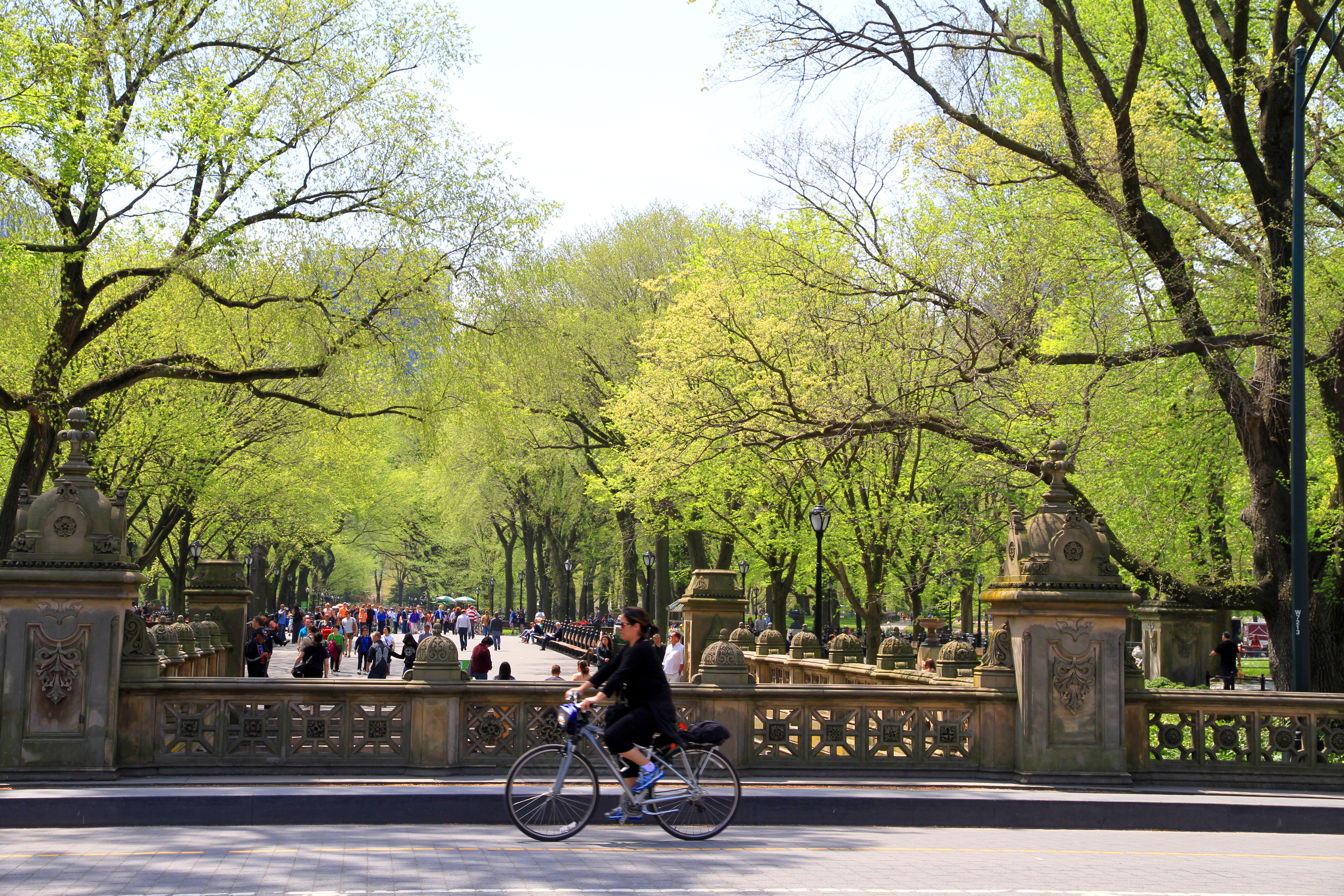

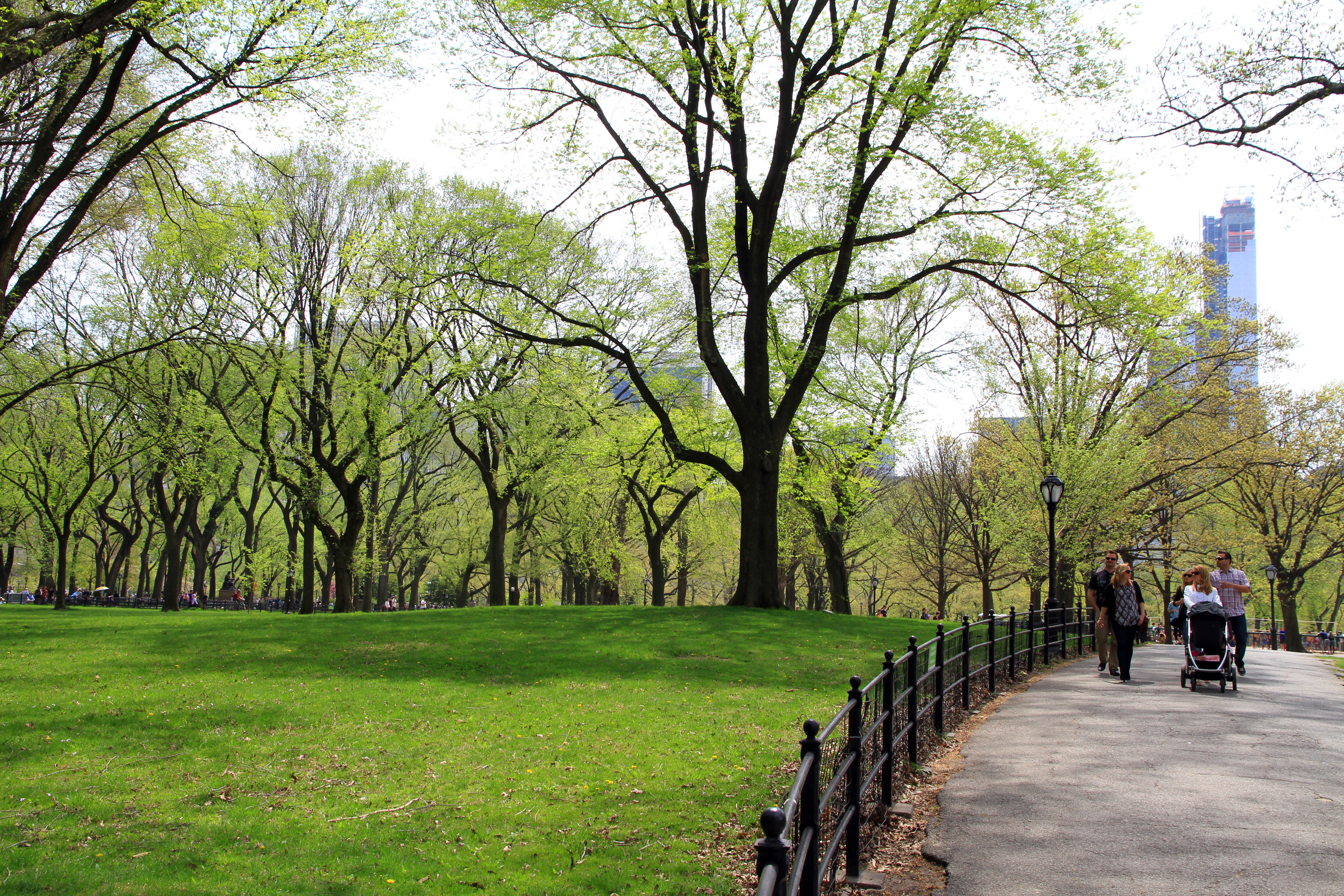

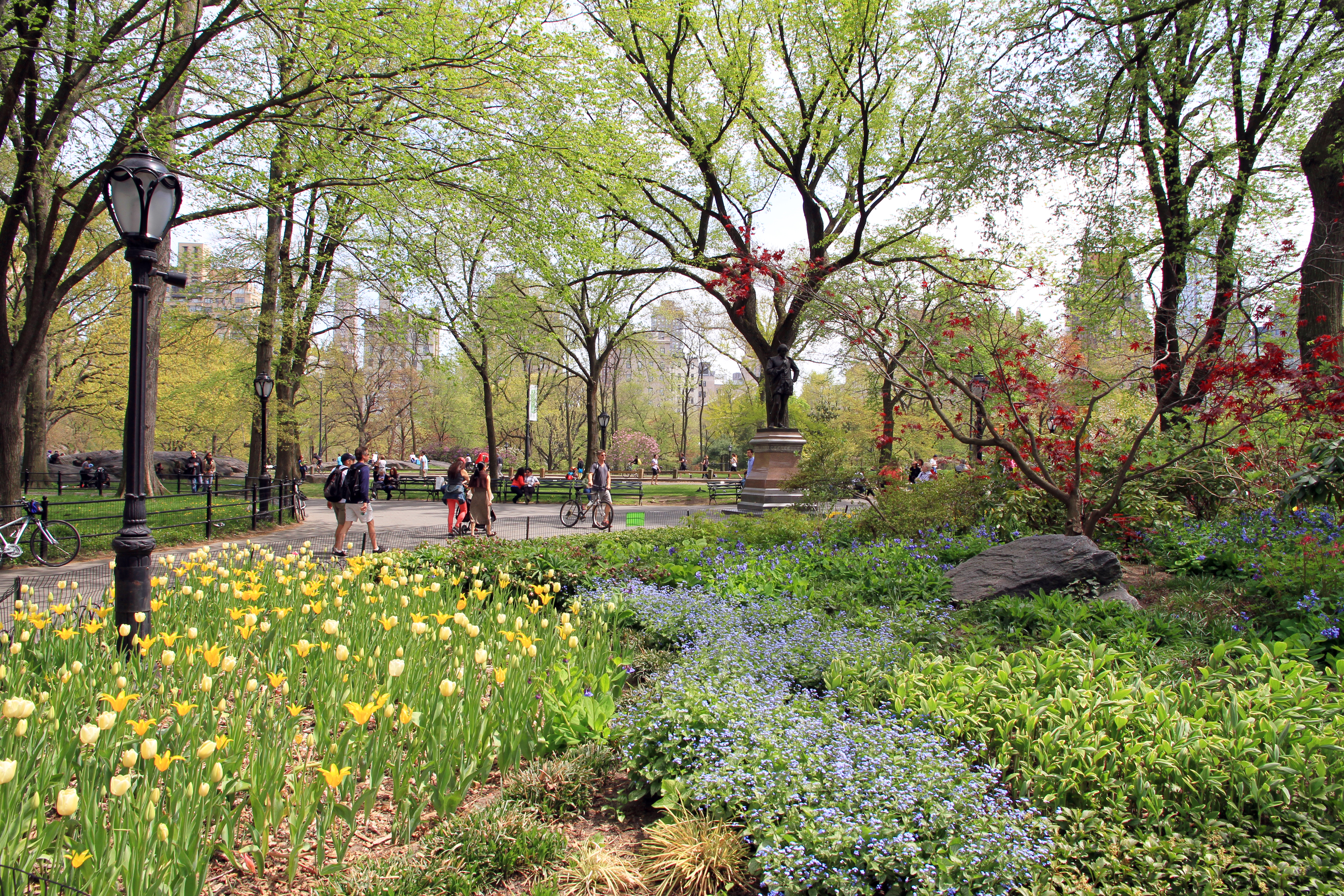

== See also ==
- "On the Mall" – a famous march composed by Edwin Franko Goldman
