= 369th =

369th may refer to:

- 369th (Croatian) Infantry Division (Wehrmacht), a so-called 'legionnaire' division of the Wehrmacht
- 369th Bombardment Squadron, inactive United States Air Force unit
- 369th Croatian Reinforced Infantry Regiment (Wehrmacht), unit of the German Wehrmacht that fought on the Eastern Front in World War II
- 369th Fighter Group, inactive United States Air Force unit
- 369th Fighter Squadron or 167th Airlift Squadron, unit of the West Virginia Air National Guard 167th Airlift Wing
- 369th Infantry Regiment (United States), infantry regiment of the United States Army National Guard that saw action in both World Wars
- 369th Regiment Armory, historic National Guard armory building located in Harlem, New York City
- 369th Signal Battalion (United States), United States Army Signal Battalion
- 369th Sustainment Brigade (United States), United States Army sustainment brigade of the 53rd Troop Command of the New York Army National Guard

== See also ==
- 369 (number)
- 369, the year 369 (CCCLXIX) of the Julian calendar
- 369 BC
