= Lewis Pilcher =

American architect

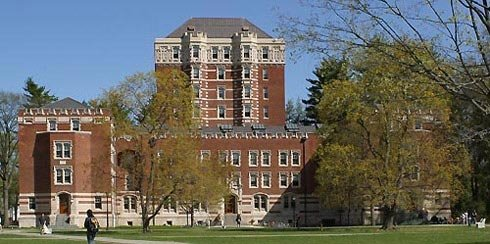
- Jewett House, Vassar College
- Born: 1871
- Died: 1941 (aged 69–70)
- Education: Columbia Graduate School of Architecture, Planning and Preservation
- Alma mater: Wesleyan University
- Known for: Architect

Lewis F. Pilcher, AIA (1871–1941), was an American academic and architect active in the late-nineteenth and early-twentieth-century New York City. With William G. Tachau, he was a partner of Pilcher and Tachau, the predecessor firm of Tachau and Vought. He was a professor of art at Vassar College in Poughkeepsie, New York. He subsequently was a state architect of New York.

== Biography ==
Pilcher attended Wesleyan University from 1889-1890, and graduated from the Columbia School of Architecture in 1895. He began his career working for Brooklyn architect Mercein Thomas, then started his own practice with former classmate W.G. Tachau. In 1901 Pilcher won a competition to design the Troop C Armory in Brooklyn, which set the state for his later term as State Architect of New York, in which position he would design several armories across the state. He went on to design the armories in Troy, Albany, Buffalo, Yonkers, and Ithaca.

Through his connections at Vassar, Pilcher designed the nine-story North Residence (1907), renamed in 1915 as Jewett House. The structure is composed of a four-story U-shaped arms block, which frames a quad-side court, and is attached to a rear eight-story tower that incorporates a 30,000-gallon water tank. The structure extensively used steel and concrete structural components faced with red brick and terracotta ornamentation. The high level of decorative work, including crenellations, grotesque terracotta faces and animals was incongruous to Vassar’s restrained red brick-with-sandstone-trim Quad dormitories and was nicknamed “Pilcher’s Crime.” The structure failed to attract donors who would have attached their name and it was instead renamed in honor of the college’s first president, Milo P. Jewett.

His partner, William G. Tachau, went on to a more successful career in the architectural firm of Tachau and Vought.

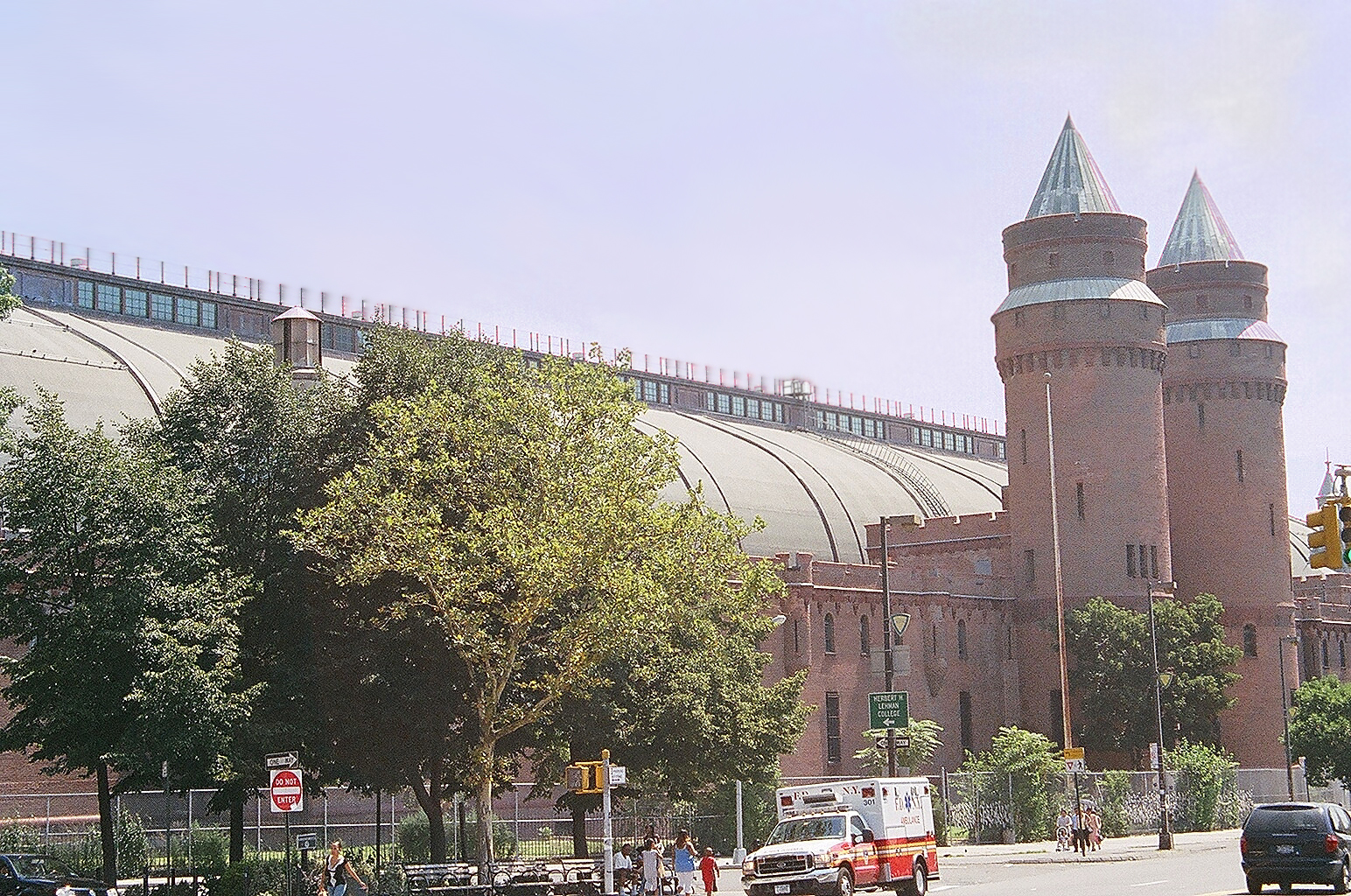
Kingsbridge Armory, Bronx, NY

== Works ==
- Jewett House (1907, formerly North Residence before 1915)
- Troop C Armory in Brooklyn, New York
- The Kingsbridge Armory in the Bronx, New York
- The Lake Hopatcong Yacht Club, Mount Arlington, New Jersey
- New York State Drill Hall, aka Barton Hall, Cornell University, Ithaca, New York, 1917
