= Martin Van Buren High School =

Public school in New York City

Location
- 230-17 Hillside Ave; Queens Village, New York 11427; United States; 40.7332°N 73.73918°W

Information
- Type: Public
- Established: September 12, 1955; 71 years ago
- School district: New York City Department of Education
- NCES School ID: 360009902030
- Principal: Deborah Nettleford
- Teaching staff: 83.42 (on an FTE basis)
- Grades: 9-12
- Enrollment: 1,068 (2022-2023)
- Student to teacher ratio: 12.80
- Campus: City: Large
- Colors: Red and Blue
- Mascot: Bumblebee
- Newspaper: The Beeline
- Yearbook: Futura
- Website: www.mvbhigh.org

Martin Van Buren High School (MVBHS) is a public high school in Queens Village, New York. The school is operated by the New York City Department of Education.

== Academics ==
The high school is accredited by the New York State Board of Regents. Of the school's graduates, 90% enroll in college.

Students may take a pre-med sequence of classes, a pre-engineering sequence of classes, or a law and forensics sequence of classes.

The school offers Advanced Placement classes in biology, calculus, English language, English literature, environmental science, Spanish, U.S. history, and world history. Students can take college-level courses on campus in government, economics, and algebra, and they can take classes at John Jay College of Criminal Justice, Queensborough Community College, and York College.

The New York State Department of Education had given Priority School status to Van Buren High School in 2015 because of low graduation rates and low scores on state testing. On December 1, 2017, Van Buren High School was removed from Priority School status because its four-year graduation rates had increased.

== Demographics ==
There are 1,157 students enrolled at Martin Van Buren High School. Of the students, 49% are black, 27% are Asian, 18% are Latino, 9% are white, 9% are American Indian, and 2% are Pacific Islander. Students come from more than twenty countries.

== History ==
In 1952, the New York City Board of Education approved the construction of a new high school at 229th Street and Hillside Avenue. Queens Village's population had greatly increased, and the school was needed to reduce overcrowding at Jamaica High School, Bayside High School, and Andrew Jackson High School. The Board of Education originally approved a budget of $3,000,000 for construction, but a few months later it increased the budget to $5,500,000. The budget was increased again to $6,000,000 (equivalent to $72,700,000 in 2025), making it the costliest school in New York City at the time.

The school was designed by Eliot B. Willauer of the notable architectural firm Eggers & Higgins, architects on the Jefferson Memorial, as part of the Board of Education's half-billion dollar post-World War II expansion program. The school was designed as a three-story building with 40 classrooms and a 1,120-seat auditorium, with a total school capacity of 3,000 students. The school would sit on 12 acres of land, 5.5 acres of which were for outdoor athletics. The official groundbreaking ceremony was held on January 6, 1954. Caristo Construction Corporation built the building.

The working name for the school had been East Queens High School, but before it opened the school was officially named Martin Van Buren High School, after the Martin Van Buren, the eighth president of the United States and the first U.S. president born in New York state. It opened to students on September 12, 1955. The school sports teams are called the "Vee Bees" (or the fighting Vee Bees), a reference to the initials VB, and have a bee as their logo.

== Notable alumni ==
This is a partial list of notable alumni of Martin Van Buren High School.

- Jon Bauman (Class of 1964) – Sha Na Na
- Steve Blank (Class of 1971) – entrepreneur and entrepreneurship guru
- Abby Joseph Cohen (Class of 1969) – economist and financial analyst
- Donny Deutsch (Class of 1975) – advertising executive and television personality
- Lowell Ganz - Television, film, theater writer
- Ilene Graff (Class of 1966) – American actress and singer
- Madeline Kahn (Class of 1960) – movie actress and singer
- Arthur Kane – member of the New York Dolls
- Martin Kove (Class of 1964) - actor
- Ray Kurzweil (Class of 1965) – inventor and futurist
- Martin Lang (born 1949) – Olympic fencer
- Robert Mapplethorpe (Class of 1963) – photographer
- Rob Parker (Class of 1982) – sports columnist and TV personality
- Tom Pecora – men's basketball head coach of Fordham University
- Julian Phillips (Class of 1973) – television personality
- Alvin Roth – Nobel prize winner in economics 2012
- Mario Savio (Class of 1960) – American political rights activist
- Lynne Stewart (Class of 1957) – imprisoned civil rights lawyer
- Frank Wilczek (Class of 1967) – awarded the 2004 Nobel Prize in Physics.
- Thomas G. Zimmerman (Class of 1975) – Inventor of VR PowerGlove
