= Elliott Sanger =

American radio station executive (1897–1989)

- Born: Elliott Maxwell Sanger; March 2, 1897; Manhattan, New York
- Died: July 9, 1989 (age 92)
- Spouse: Eleanor Naumburg
- Children: 2
- Family: David E. Sanger (grandson)

Elliott Sanger (March 2, 1897 – July 9, 1989) was the American co-founder of WQXR-FM and an early advocate of FM broadcasting.

== Biography ==
Elliott Maxwell Sanger was born to a Jewish family in Manhattan on March 2, 1897. He graduated from Townsend Harris High School and then the Columbia University School of Journalism. During World War I, he served as an ensign tasked with selling war bonds before accepting a job as a copywriter at an advertising agency and then as the director of advertising and sales at hosiery manufacturer J.R. Beaton Company. In 1936, Sanger co-founded a small 250 watt radio station WQXR-FM (originally the Interstate Broadcasting Company) above a garage in Long Island City with John Vincent Lawless Hogan with whom he shared a love for classical music with the belief that high quality, high fidelity, live music would eventually attract advertisers. As an early advocate of the clarity and high fidelity of FM broadcasting, WQXR became the first FM station in New York City and the first nationally to present a regularly scheduled FM program. In order to maintain its semblance of decorum, the station prohibited "singing jingles and raucous sound effects." In 1944, WQXR The New York Times bought the station. Sanger served as executive vice president and general manager of WQXR from its founding until 1965 and chairman until 1967 when he retired.

Sanger documented his story in the 1973 book, Rebel in Radio: The Story of WQXR, published by Hastings House.

== Personal life ==
Sanger was married to Eleanor Naumburg, grandniece of Elkan Naumburg; they had two sons, Elliott Sanger Jr. and Kenneth E. Sanger. His grandson is journalist David E. Sanger. Sanger collected rare books on New York City history which he donated to Columbia University. He served as a former president of Elder Craftsmen dedicated to helping people sell their crafts; served as director of Manhattan's Grand Jury Association; and was an interviewer in oral histories for the American Jewish Committee. In 1952, he received a Distinguished Alumnus Award from his alma mater Columbia University.
