= Eliot Butler Willauer =

American architect

- Born: April 4, 1912; Rye, New York
- Died: February 6, 1972 (aged 59); New York City, New York
- Known for: Architect

Eliot Butler Willauer, AIA, (April 4, 1912 – February 6, 1972) was an American architect active in mid-twentieth-century New York City. With William G. Tachau, he was a principal in the architectural firm of Tachau & Vought, the successor firm to Pitcher & Tachau. The firm, located on 102 East 30th Street around 1923, specialized in mental hygiene hospitals. He went on to a career as an associate with the firm of Eggers & Higgins.

== Personal life ==
Willauer was born April 4, 1912, in Rye, New York, and attended Phillips Exeter Academy, graduating in 1930. He earned his bachelor's degree and Master of Fine Arts from Princeton University in 1934 and 1937 (from the Graduate School of Architecture), respectively.

Willauer was married on May 27, 1938. He had two children and was residing on Tar Rock Road, Westport, Connecticut, in 1955. He was associated with Whiting Willauer (1906–1962)

== Career ==
Willauer worked as a draftsman in the firm of Louis E. Jallade from 1937 to 1938. He joined Tachau and Vought in 1938, serving as a junior draftsman and associate, being certified as an architect in 1940, before leaving in 1941 to work for a year as a draftsman in Shreve, Lamb & Harmon. Between 1942 and 1945, he worked as a draftsman in the firm of Gibbs and Cox. He rejoined Tachau and Vought in 1945 as a junior associate but left in 1946. He was a member of the American Institute of Architects from 1955, and registered as an architect in New York, New Jersey and Connecticut. He joined the large architectural firm of Eggers & Higgins as project manager in 1946. By 1970, he retained his work address at 100 E. 42nd St, New York, N.Y. 10017 but did not specify his architectural firm, which had previously been listed Eggers & Higgins at the same address.

== Works ==
- Addition to the Senate Office Building, Washington, D.C. (with J. George Stewart)
- Martin Van Buren High School (Queens, New York) (1955)
