= Pilcher and Tachau =

American architectural firm

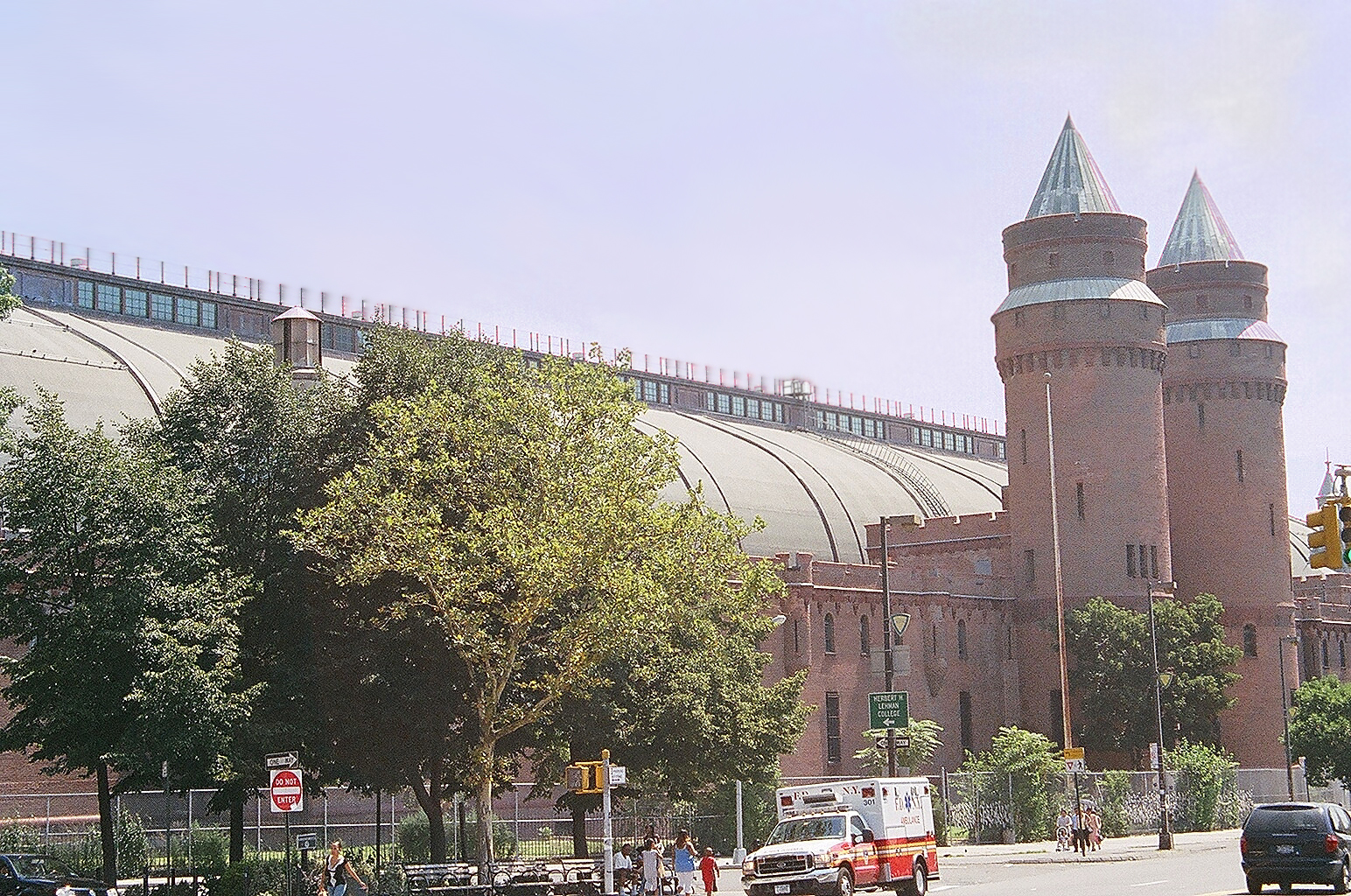
Kingsbridge Armory, Bronx, NY

Pilcher and Tachau was an American architectural firm in the late-nineteenth and early-twentieth-century New York City, and was the predecessor firm of Tachau and Vought. It was formed by Lewis Pilcher and William G. Tachau.

Lewis Pilcher was a professor of art at Vassar College in Poughkeepsie, New York. He subsequently was a state architect of New York. Through his connections at Vassar, Pilcher designed the nine-story North Residence (1907), renamed in 1915 as Jewett House. The structure is composed of a four-story U-shaped arms framing a quad-side court with the rear nine-story tower incorporating a 30,000 gallon water tank. The structure extensively used steel and concrete structural components faced with red brick and terracotta ornamentation. The high level of decorative work, including crenellations, grotesque terracotta faces and animals was incongruous to Vassar's restrained Quad dormitories and was nicknamed "Pilcher's Crime". The structure failed to attract donors who would attach their name and it was renamed in honor of the college's first president, Milo P. Jewett, instead.

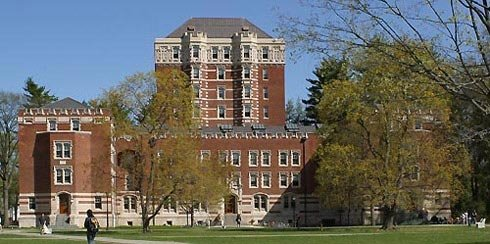
Jewett House, Vassar College

== Works ==
- Louisville Free Public Library (1906)
- Jewett House (1907, formerly North Residence before 1915)
- Troop C Armory in Brooklyn, New York
- The Kingsbridge Armory in the Bronx, New York
