= Abby Joseph Cohen =

American financial analyst

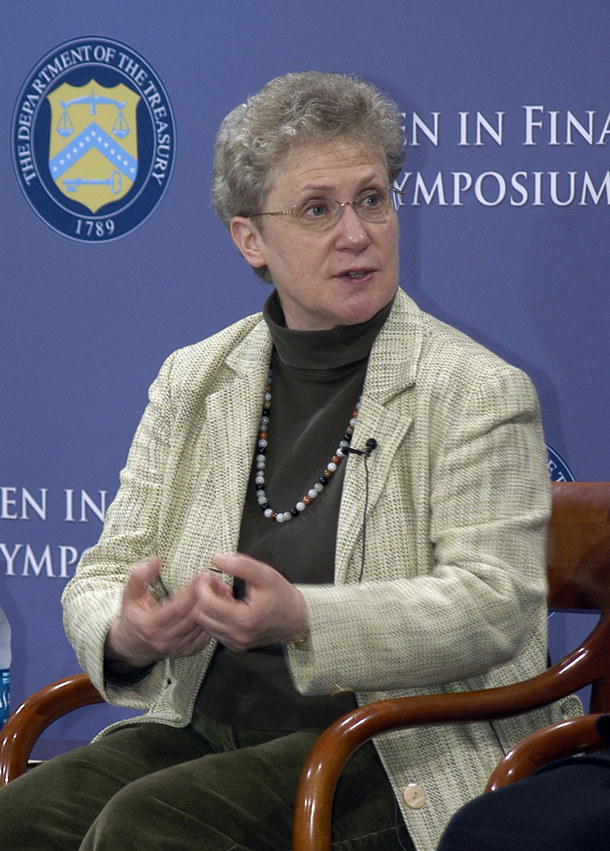
- Born: February 29, 1952 (age 74); Queens, New York City, U.S.
- Education: Cornell University; George Washington University
- Occupations: Economist, Financial analyst
- Spouse: David M. Cohen
- Children: 2

Abby Joseph Cohen (born February 29, 1952) is an American economist and financial analyst on Wall Street. She is a professor of business at Columbia Business School. In 1999, she was first named as one of the most powerful women in business by Fortune Magazine. Later accolades included being named the second most powerful woman in finance by American Banker Magazine and one of the 30 most powerful women in America by Ladies Home Journal. Cohen has been included in Barron's 100 most influential women in finance every year since the list's inception.

She worked at Goldman Sachs for three decades, including as the firm's Chief Investment Strategist prior to March 2008 and then as leader of its policy-oriented Global Markets Institute, before retiring from Goldman Sachs in 2022. Her career has been the subject of a Harvard Business School case study, a cover story in BusinessWeek Magazine and a feature article in The New Yorker magazine, including cartoon.

== Family and education ==
Cohen was born in a Jewish household in Queens, New York, the daughter of Raymond and Shirley (née Silverstein) Joseph. She graduated from Martin Van Buren High School in Queens. Cohen earned a B.A. in economics and computer science from Cornell University (1973) and an M.S. in economics from George Washington University (1976). She has three honorary doctorates, including one in engineering. She obtained her Chartered Financial Analyst (CFA) designation in 1980.

She is married to David M. Cohen. They have two daughters.

== Career ==
Cohen began her career as an economist in 1973 at the Federal Reserve Board in Washington, D.C., serving until 1977. She worked as an economist and quantitative research director for T. Rowe Price Associates. From 1983 until 1988, Cohen was the vice president in charge of investment strategy at Drexel Burnham Lambert.

Following the Michael Milken fiasco and subsequent United States Department of Justice investigation into Drexel Burnham Lambert's affairs that led to the firm's demise, Cohen worked for a short time with Barclays de Zoete Wedd, then joined Goldman Sachs in New York City as a vice president and co-chair of the Investment Policy Committee in 1990, and was named a managing director in 1996 and a partner in 1998.

=== Successes and failures ===
She is famous for predicting the bull market of the 1990s early in the decade, and was named Institutional Investor's top strategist in 1998 and 1999. CNBC referred to the market decline in March 2000 as "The Abby Effect" because she urged investors to reduce their exposure to internet stocks. However, she was criticized for adopting a more bullish stance in August 2000, a few weeks prior to the 9/11 attacks which triggered a recession.

Like most of Wall Street, she failed to foresee the extent of the financial crisis and the great Bear Market of 2008. In December 2007, the Goldman Sachs team predicted the S&P 500 index would rally to 1,675 in 2008, the most optimistic of 14 Wall Street forecasters. This forecast was revised substantially lower in January 2008. The S&P 500 traded as low as 741 by November 2008. In March 2008 David Kostin became the bank's chief forecaster for the U.S. stock market.

== Civic works ==
Abby Joseph Cohen has served as a trustee of Cornell University, Weill Cornell Medicine and the Brookings Institution, and during 2009–2015 was chair of the Board of Trustees of the Jewish Theological Seminary of America. She was the chair of the board of the Chartered Financial Analysts Institute, a large global organization representing professional investors, and was vice chair of the Economic Club of New York. She served on the national board of the Smithsonian Institution. Cohen is currently on the board of economic advisors to the New York State legislature and to the New York State Division of Financial Services. During the Obama Administration she was on the President's Task Force for Innovation and Global Economic Competitiveness.

She and her husband have been supporters of the United States Holocaust Memorial Museum, the American Museum of Natural History, the Museum of Modern Art and the Metropolitan Opera.
