= 42nd Infantry Division Sustainment Brigade =

- 42nd Infantry Division Sustainment Brigade shoulder sleeve insignia
- Active: 1913-present
- Country: United States
- Allegiance: New York
- Branch: United States Army
- Role: Sustainment
- Size: Brigade
- Part of: United States Army National Guard
- Garrison/HQ: 369th Regiment Armory; New York City
- Nickname: Harlem Hellfighters (special designation)
- Engagements: World War I World War II; Gulf War

Insignia
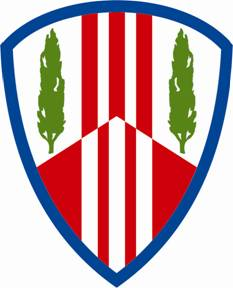
- 369th Sustainment Brigade former SSI

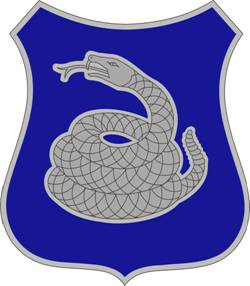
- 369th Sustainment Brigade DUI

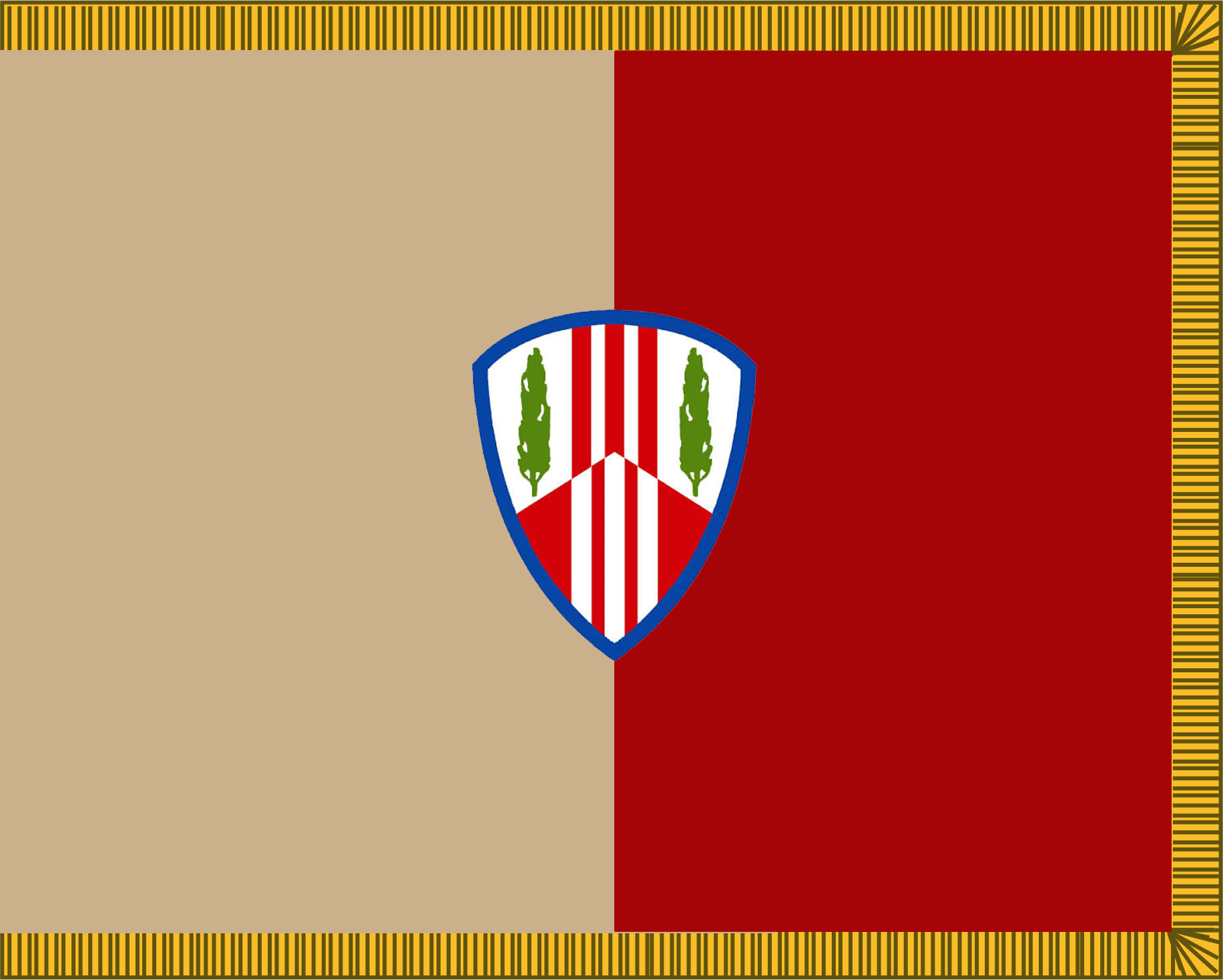
- 369th Sustainment Brigade Flag

The 42nd Infantry Division Sustainment Brigade (former 369th Sustainment Brigade) is a United States Army sustainment brigade of the 42nd Infantry Division of the New York Army National Guard headquartered out of the 369th Regiment Armory in Harlem, New York. This unit is descended from the 369th Infantry Regiment.

== Organization ==
The 369th Sustainment Brigade is currently assigned directly to the 53d Troop Command of the New York Army National Guard.

The following Subordinate elements of the 42nd Sustainment Brigade are:

- 42nd Special Troops Battalion
  - Headquarters and Headquarters Company (HHC)
  - 187th Signal Company (Support)
  - 145th Maintenance Company
  - 133d Supply Company (Composite)
  - 719th Transportation Company
  - 1569th Transportation Company
  - 27th Finance Company
- 101st Expeditionary Signal Battalion (101st ESB)
  - Headquarters and Headquarters Company (HHC) 101st Expeditionary Signal Battalion (101st ESB)
  - Company A, 101st ESB
  - Company B, 101st ESB
  - Company C, 101st ESB
- 104th Military Police Battalion (104th MPB) (Kingston, New York
  - Headquarters and Headquarters Detachment (HHD), 104th Military Police Battalion (104th MPB), Kingston
  - 727th Military Police Detachment (727th MPD) (Law and Order), Poughkeepsie
  - 107th Military Police Company (107th MPC)
  - 466th Medical Company (Area), Queensbury
  - 222d Chemical Company, Brooklyn
  - 442d Military Police Company (442nd MPC), Jamaica)

== Service history ==
In October 2016, the Brigade Headquarters and Special Troops Battalion Headquarters deployed to Kuwait under the 1st Theater Sustainment Command in support of Operation Inherent Resolve and Operation Spartan Shield. The 369th assumed the mission from the 17th Sustainment Brigade. The 369th was commanded by Colonel Stephen Bousquet and the Special Troops Battalion by Colonel Seth Morgulas.

In October 2022, the Brigade Headquarters and Special Troops Battalion Headquarters again deployed to Kuwait under the 1st Theater Sustainment Command in support of Operation Inherent Resolve and Operation Spartan Shield. The 369th assumed the mission from the 36th Sustainment Brigade. The 369th was commanded by Colonel Seth Morgulas and the Special Troops Battalion by Lieutenant Colonel Michael Bedryk.

In both the October 2016 and October 2022 deployments, the 369th provided mission command to Logistics, Human Resources, Military Police and Financial Management units in seventeen countries.

== Lineage ==
- Constituted 2 June 1913 in the New York National Guard as the 15th Infantry Regiment
- Organized 29 June 1916 at New York City
- Mustered into federal service 25 July 1917 at Camp Whitman, New York; drafted into federal service 5 August 1917
  - (15th Battalion organized 3 August 1917 in the New York Guard to replace regiment in federal service; expanded, reorganized, and redesignated 31 July 1918 as the 15th Infantry, New York Guard)
- Assigned 1 December 1917 to the 185th Infantry Brigade
  - (185th Infantry Brigade assigned 5 January 1918 to the 93rd Division (Provisional))
- Reorganized and redesignated 1 March 1918 as the 369th Infantry
- Relieved 8 May 1918 from assignment to the 165th Infantry Brigade
- Assigned 9 September 1918 to the French 161st Division
- Relieved 12 December 1918 from assignment to the French 161st Division
- Demobilized 28 February 1919 at Camp Upton, New York
- Consolidated with the 15th Infantry, New York Guard, and consolidated unit reorganized in the New York National Guard as the 369th Infantry; Headquarters federally recognized 6 September 1924 at New York City
- Converted and redesignated 30 August 1940 as the 369th Coast Artillery
- Inducted into Federal service 13 January 1941 at New York City
- Regiment broken up 12 December 1943 and its elements reorganized and redesignated as follows:
  - Headquarters and Headquarters Detachment, 1st Battalion as Headquarters Battery, 369th Antiaircraft Artillery Gun Battalion
  - Headquarters and Headquarters Detachment, 2nd Battalion as Headquarters Battery, 870th Antiaircraft Artillery Automatic Weapons Battalion
  - Remainder of regiment as Headquarters and Headquarters Battery, 369th Antiaircraft Artillery Group, 726th Antiaircraft Artillery Searchlight Battery, and elements of the 369th Antiaircraft Artillery Gun Battalion and 870th Antiaircraft Artillery Automatic Weapons Battalion (hereafter separate lineage)
- After 12 December 1943 the above units underwent changes as follows:
  - Headquarters Battery, 369th Antiaircraft Artillery Gun Battalion, inactivated 21 January 1946 at Camp Anza, California
  - Reorganized and Federally recognized 29 October 1947 at New York City
  - Ordered into active Federal service 11 September 1950 at New York; released 10 September 1952 from active Federal service and reverted to state control
  - Redesignated 1 October 1953 as Headquarters Battery, 369th Antiaircraft Artillery Battalion
  - Reorganized and redesignated 1 April 1955 as Headquarters Battery, 569th Field Artillery Battalion
  - Headquarters Battery, 870th Antiaircraft Artillery Automatic Weapons Battalion, inactivated 15 January 1946 at Fort Lawton, Washington
  - Reorganized and Federally recognized 30 October 1947 at New York City
  - Reorganized and redesignated 1 September 1951 as Headquarters Battery, 870th Antiaircraft Artillery Gun Battalion
  - Redesignated 1 October 1953 as Headquarters Battery, 870th Antiaircraft Artillery Battalion
  - Reorganized and redesignated 1 April 1955 as Headquarters Battery, 970th Field Artillery Battalion
- Headquarters Battery, 569th Field Artillery Battalion, and Headquarters Battery, 970th Field Artillery Battalion, consolidated 16 March 1959 and consolidated unit reorganized and redesignated as Headquarters Battery, 1st Howitzer Battalion, 369th Artillery
- Converted and redesignated 1 February 1968 as Headquarters and Headquarters Detachment, 569th Transportation Battalion
- Ordered into active Federal service 24 March 1970 at New York City; released 30 March 1970 from active Federal service and reverted to state control
- Consolidated 1 December 1971 with the 669th Transportation Detachment (organized and Federally recognized 1 February 1968 at New York) and consolidated unit designated as Headquarters and Headquarters Detachment, 569th Transportation Battalion
- Redesignated 1 March 1974 as Headquarters and Headquarters Detachment, 369th Transportation Battalion
- Ordered into active Federal service 11 December 1990 at New York City; released 8 July 1991 from active Federal service and reverted to state control
- Reorganized and redesignated 1 September 1994 as Headquarters and Headquarters Detachment, 369th Support Battalion
- Ordered into active Federal service 7 December 2003 at New York City; released from active Federal service 3 June 2005 and reverted to state control
- Consolidated 1 September 2006 with the 10th Transportation Detachment (see ANNEX), and consolidated unit expanded, reorganized and redesignated as the 369th Sustainment Brigade

ANNEX:

- Constituted 1 October 1996 in the New York Army National Guard as the 10th Transportation Detachment
- Organized and Federally recognized 3 March 2003 at New York City
- Ordered into active Federal service 15 March 2003 at New York City; released from active Federal service 8 August 2004 and reverted to state control

== Campaign streamers ==
=== World War I ===
- Champagne-Marne
- Meuse Argonne
- Champagne 1918
- Alsace 1918
- Lorraine 1918 (Early Entry Element only)

=== World War II ===
- Naples-Foggia (Early Entry Element only)
- Rome-Arno (Early Entry Element only)
- Eastern Mandates (Early Entry Element only)
- Western Pacific (Early Entry Element only)
- North Apennines (Early Entry Element only)
- Luzon (Early Entry Element only)
- Po Valley (Early Entry Element only)
- Ryukyus

=== Southwest Asia ===
- Defense of Saudi Arabia
- Liberation and Defense of Kuwait
- Cease-Fire

=== War on Terrorism ===
- Campaigns to be determined

== Unit Decorations ==
- Meritorious Unit Commendation (Army), Streamer embroidered SOUTHWEST ASIA 1990-1991
- Meritorious Unit Commendation (Army), Streamer embroidered IRAQ 2004
- French Croix de Guerre with Silver Star, World War I, Streamer embroidered MEUSE-ARGONNE
- Navy Unit Commendation, Streamer embroidered ENIWETOK ATOLL (Early Entry Element only)
- Philippine Presidential Unit Citation, Streamer embroidered 17 OCTOBER 1944 TO 4 JULY 1945 (Early Entry Element only)

== Insignia ==
The shoulder sleeve insignia is an embroidered shield with a blue border blazoned with Argent and Gules chevron between three counterchanged palets (vertical bars), and two Vert poplar trees. It was approved for the 369th Sustainment Brigade on 7 February 2008.

The chevron symbolize the unit's mission of support. The palets/vertical bars signify military strength and allude to the three campaigns in Saudi Arabia, Kuwait, and Iraq. The counterchanged colors of the palets/vertical bars signify the various transformations of the unit to become the 396th Sustainment Brigade. The poplar tree, adapted from the 369th Infantry Battalion's coat of arms, indicates the Brigade perpetuating the lineage of the Battalion.

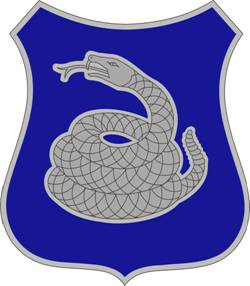

The distinctive unit insignia is a silver metal and enamel device. It consists of a blue shield charged with a silver rattlesnake coiled and ready to strike. The snake image, used on some colonial flags, is associated with the thirteen original colonies. The silver rattlesnake on the blue shield was the distinctive regimental insignia of the 369th Infantry Regiment, ancestor of the unit, and alludes to the service of the organization during World War I.

The distinctive unit insignia, originally approved for the 369th Infantry Regiment on 17 April 1923, was redesignated several times: for the 369th Coast Artillery Regiment on 3 December 1940; for the 369th Antiaircraft Artillery Gun Battalion on 7 January 1944; for the 569th Field Artillery Battalion on 14 August 1956; for the 369th Artillery Regiment on 4 April 1962. It was amended to correct the wording of the description on 2 September 1964. It was further redesignated: for the 569th Transportation Battalion and amended to add a motto on 13 March 1969; for the 369th Transportation Battalion and amended to delete the motto on 14 January 1975; for the 369th Support Battalion and amended to revise the description and symbolism on 2 November 1994; for the 369th Sustainment Brigade and amended to revise the description and symbolism on 20 July 2007.

== Deployment ==
In late 2016, the 369th Sustainment Brigade was deployed to Camp Arifjan, Kuwait, and assumed command and control of sustainment operations in seventeen west Asian countries under the United States Central Command.

In late 2022, the 369th Sustainment Brigade was deployed to Camp Arifjan, Kuwait, and assumed command and control of sustainment operations in Western Asian countries under the United States Central Command.
