= 369th Regiment Armory =

Armory in Manhattan, New York

- U.S. National Register of Historic Places
- New York City Landmark
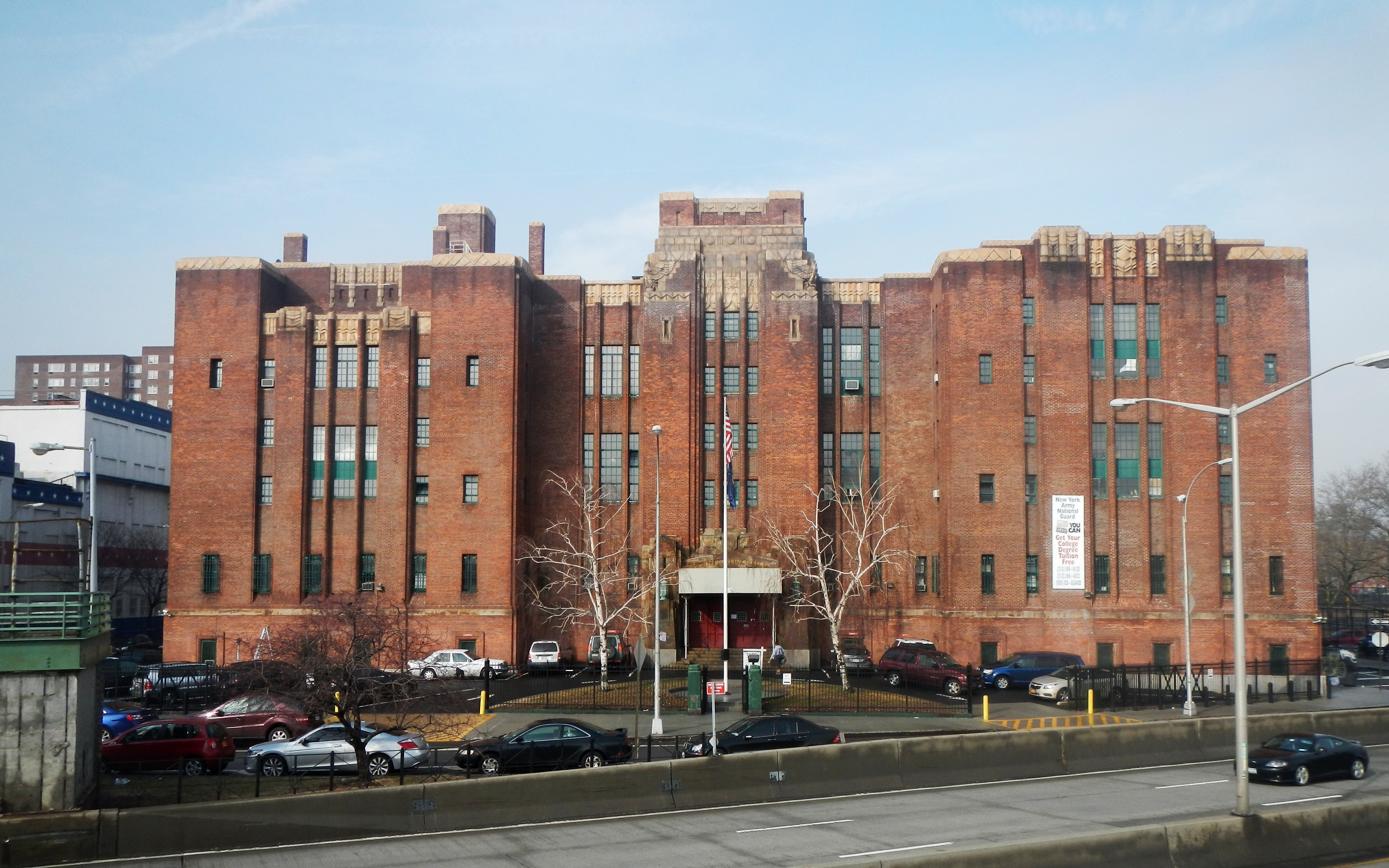
- 369th Regiment Armory, Jan 2013
- Location: 2366 Fifth Avenue, New York City
- Coordinates: 40°49′03″N 73°56′05″W
- Area: 2 acres (0.81 ha)
- Built: 1933
- Architects: Tachau & Vought; Van Wart & Wein
- Architectural style: Art Deco
- MPS: Army National Guard Armories in New York State MPS
- NRHP reference No.: 93001537
- NYCL No.: 1390

Significant dates
- Added to NRHP: January 28, 1994
- Designated NYCL: May 14, 1985

The 369th Regiment Armory is a historic National Guard Armory building located at 2366 Fifth Avenue, between West 142nd and 143rd Streets, in Harlem, Manhattan, New York City. It was built for the 369th Regiment, also known as the "Harlem Hellfighters", founded in 1913 as the first National Guard unit in New York State composed solely of African-Americans. It later became home to the 369th Sustainment Brigade.

The 369th Regiment Armory includes two structures. The administration building, built in the Art Deco style between 1930 and 1933, was designed by John S. Van Wart and Sidney Wein. The attached medieval-inspired drill shed, built between 1921 and 1924, was designed by Tachau and Vought and measures 50,000 square feet (4,600 m^{2}). Both sections are constructed of brick. The armory was listed on the National Register of Historic Places in 1994, and was designated as a city landmark by the New York City Landmarks Preservation Commission in 1985.

== History ==
=== Context ===
After the American Civil War ended, the New York state government passed a law, which mandated that armories be erected for volunteer regiments by each of the individual counties. This resulted in the Armory Board of the City of New York being created in April 1884. The board erected many of Manhattan's armories: prior to the board's establishment, only one armory had been built in Manhattan, the Seventh Regiment Armory on the Upper East Side. As such, most volunteer regiments drilled in any available space, such as public markets or rented building lofts.

By the late 19th and early 20th century, the former Dutch colonial settlement of Harlem was being developed into a primarily African-American neighborhood, having become accessible via the newly built New York City Subway. In the 1910s, a hundred members of a community center in Harlem stated their intention to join the military. The 15th Regiment, whose parent unit was constituted in the New York Army National Guard in 1913, was officially organized three years later, in preparation for being deployed to France during World War I. The 15th was the first National Guard regiment constituted based on race, as it was composed primarily of African Americans, but also included servicemembers from Puerto Rico, the West Indies, Canada, and several countries in Europe and Africa. The regiment reached its full strength of 2,000 men by 1917, and trained in New York and South Carolina because they did not yet have their own armory. The 15th Regiment was reorganized as the 369th in 1918. The 369th Regiment had returned from France by February 1919; a parade for the regiment was held on Fifth Avenue.

=== Construction ===
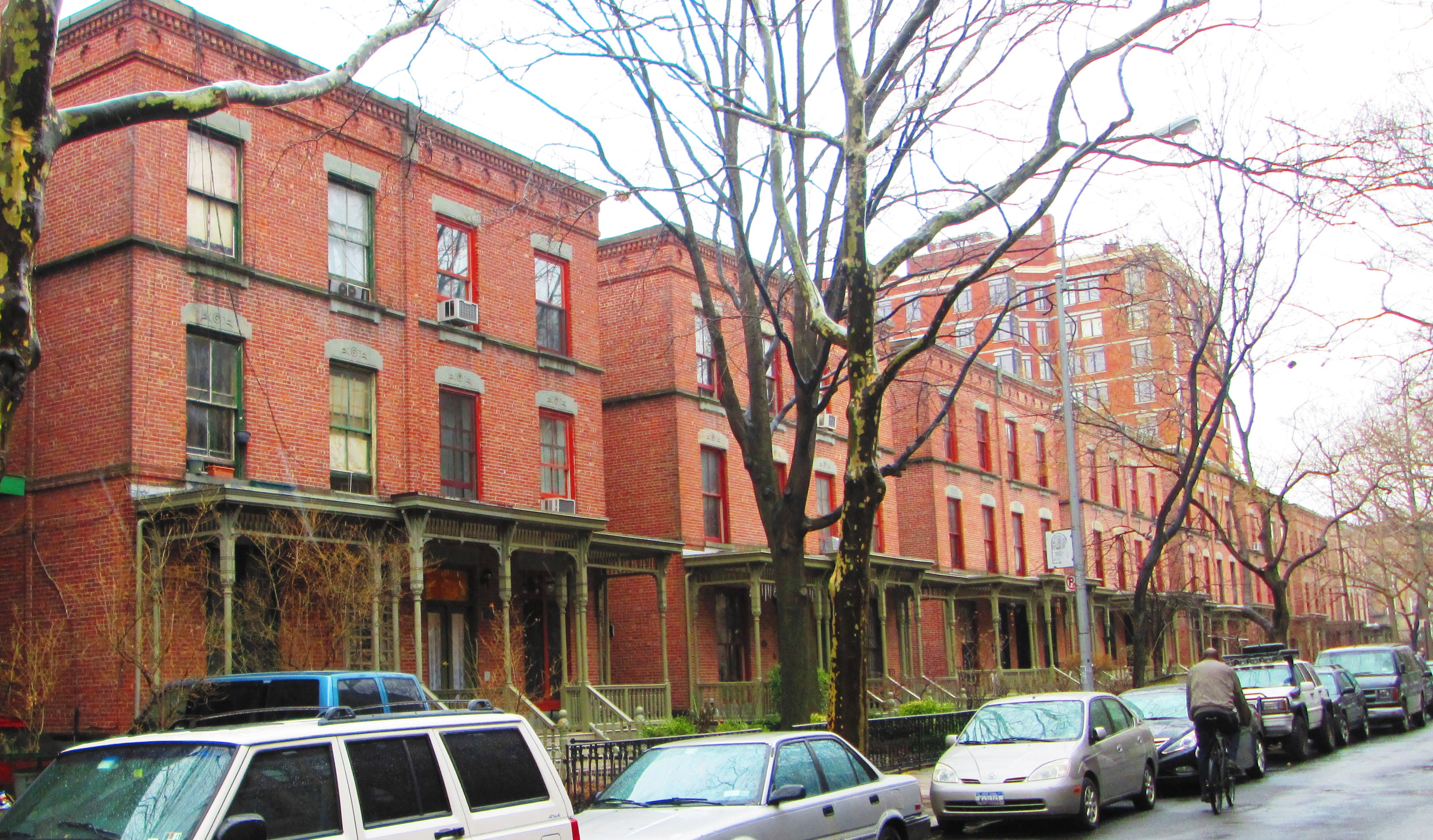
Astor Row, original location of the 369th Regiment

The 369th Regiment (also known by their nickname, the "Harlem Hell Fighters") was initially housed at Astor Row on West 130th Street. However, as a result of the unit's reorganization, the Armory Board was now obligated to create an armory for the 369th Regiment. The city's acting mayor promised an armory structure to the 369th Regiment in 1919. Funding for the 369th Regiment Armory–advocated for by Charles H. Roberts, one of the city's first two black aldermen—was approved by the city in July 1921. The initial plans called for building only the drill shed; an administration building was required for the armory to be fully functional.

The city identified a site on Fifth Avenue between 142nd and 143rd Streets and demolished the tenements there. Work on the armory's drill shed was begun with a groundbreaking ceremony in November 1921. This was followed by a request for proposals to design the drill shed, for which five firms submitted bids. Tachau and Vought, who had previously designed the Kingsbridge Armory in the Bronx, won the commission and designed the structure in the Romanesque style. Post & McCord were selected as the contractors. The cost of the drill shed was estimated at $700,000, and the administration building, another $500,000. The cornerstone was laid in November 1923, when construction was already progressing. and the drill shed was finished the following November at a cost of $800,000.

The rest of the block was purchased by the city in 1929, in preparation for the administration building's construction. In 1930, the Armory Board submitted plans for the $1 million administration building to the New York City Board of Estimate. The new building would include a shooting range, auditorium, mess hall, and rooftop tennis courts. Twelve firms submitted designs for the drill shed, and the commission was ultimately given to the lowest bidder, John S. Van Wart and Sidney Wein. Work started in 1931 after the C & W Construction Company were named as the contractors. The administration building was completed in 1933. However, the New York Daily News reported in January 1934 that the 369th Regiment had refused to accept title to the administration building, citing various work defects such as a leaky roof. As a result, the Armory Board opened an investigation into the construction of the 369th Administration Building.

=== Use ===
In 1934, during the Great Depression, the 369th Regiment Armory and Brooklyn's 14th Regiment Armory were used as temporary homeless shelters. Two years later, the armory exhibited artwork from 40,000 people that had been hired through the Works Progress Administration. The 369th Regiment Armory also hosted sporting events, such as track and field competitions and tennis matches. Other events hosted at the armory included a speech by Black Muslim leader Elijah Muhammad in 1964, and a soccer demonstration from Brazilian soccer player Pelé in 1978.

The 369th Armory was again used as a temporary shelter during early 1981 due to extreme cold weather. By the 1980s, existing homeless shelters in New York City had become overcrowded, so the city started opening new shelters in armories. In 1982, the state turned over the 369th Regiment Armory to the city so that the latter could open a 200-bed men's homeless shelter. However, the 369th Sustainment Brigade still operated out of the armory. In the 1990s, the 369th Regiment Armory received part of a $390,000 funding allocation that had been made available as part of the city's Tax Syndication Sharing Program. The funds were intended for the armory's restoration. The structure was protected as a city landmark by the New York City Landmarks Preservation Commission in 1985, and was listed on the National Register of Historic Places in 1994.

When New York City bid for the 2012 Summer Olympics, the plans called for restoring the decrepit 369th Regiment Armory for the boxing and rhythmic gymnastics events. A year after the bid was rejected, the Police Athletic League of New York City used part of the 369th Regiment Armory's drill shed as a community center. The Harlem Children's Zone also operated programs in the armory, taking about half of the space. In September 2012, a community program painted a mural on the armory's walls that depicted the 369th Regiment's history. In October 2012, Hurricane Sandy partially flooded the building.

The Armory closed for renovations in 2014, with plans to create a museum showing 369th Regiment memorabilia. The 369th Brigade moved back to the building in November 2018. The armory remained closed to civilians while lead was removed from the basement.

== Description ==
The 369th Regiment Armory is located between West 142nd and 143rd Streets at 2360 Fifth Avenue, along the western sidewalk of the avenue. It is the northernmost building on Fifth Avenue. The armory is composed of two structures in contrasting architectural styles: the medieval-style drill shed and the Art Deco-style administration building. The armory occupies nearly its entire lot, which measures 199 feet (61 m) from north to south and 510 feet (160 m) from west to east. It is associated with the 369th Regiment, the first African-American regiment in the New York Army National Guard. The surrounding areas are composed of industrial buildings, while the Harlem River Drive runs on the opposite side of Fifth Avenue across from the armory.

The AIA Guide to New York City described the armory as "a superb example of the bricklayer's art" and that the brickwork "exhibit[s] an Art Deco/Moderne style rather than an attempt to reconstruct a medieval fortress".

=== Administration building ===
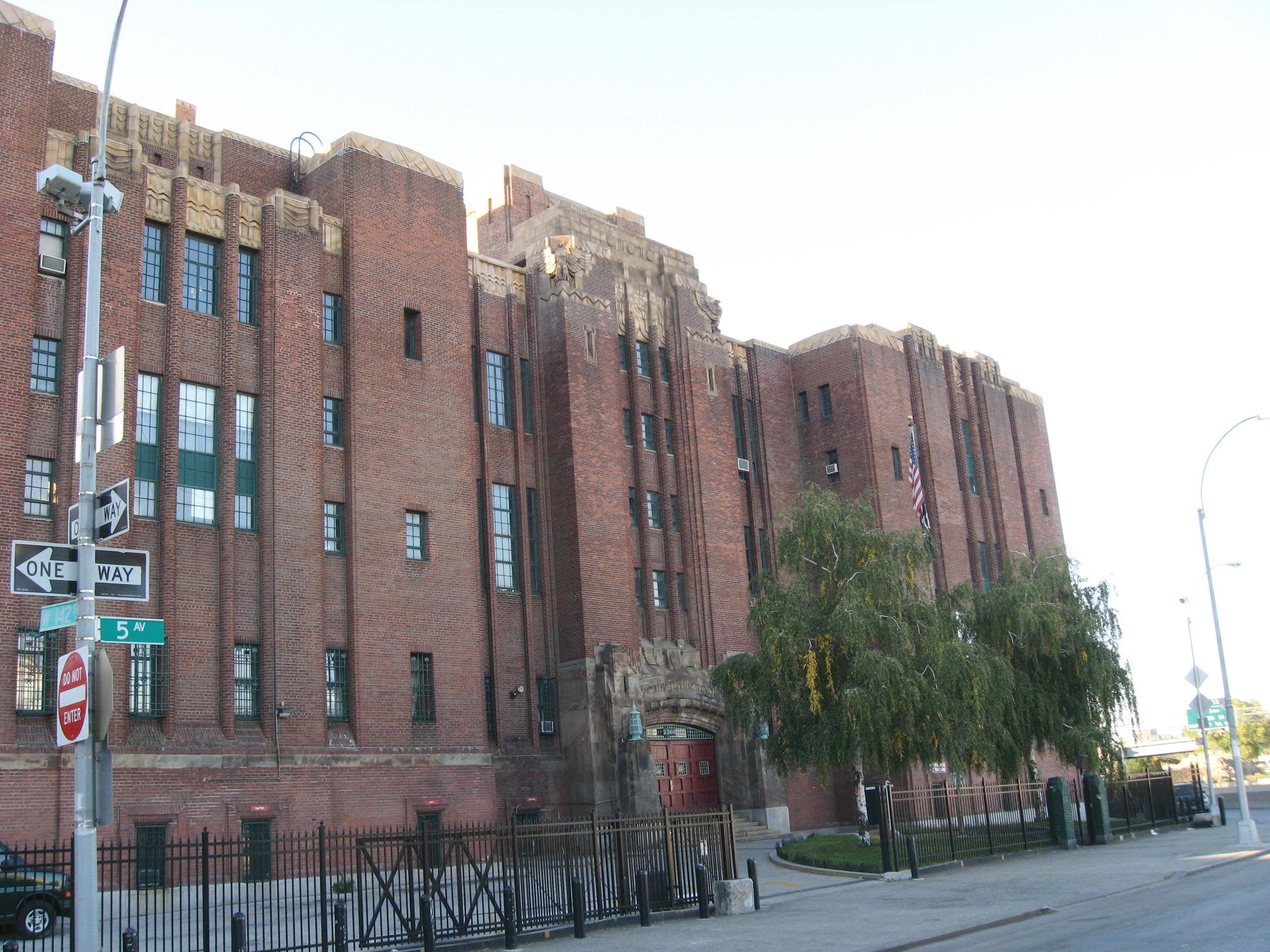
Administration building

The 3 1/2-story, rectangular administration building features a terracotta parapet embellished with chevron designs and stylized eagles. The basement is raised by half a story and contains a water table made of red sandstone. Throughout the building, the first-story windows contain iron grilles with decorations depicting maces and stars.

The main facade, to the east, contains numerous recessed and projecting sections, alternating with each other. This facade contains its main entrance pavilion in the center, and two asymmetric side pavilions to the north and south. Above the entrance pavilion is a sandstone surround, which contains the carved letters "369th Infantry N.Y.C." and is flanked by eagle-wing motifs that contain lanterns. The raised basement also contains entrances surrounded with sandstone trim. Adjacent to the eastern facade is a circular driveway with an adjacent small parking lot. A small lawn is located between the driveway and Fifth Avenue. A statue to the 369th Regiment stands across Fifth Avenue from the administration building. The northern and southern facades are located next to the sidewalks of 143rd and 142nd Streets, respectively.

Inside, the corridors contain terrazzo tile floors as well as cornices with chevron motifs. A company meeting room is located at the administration building's southeast corner and includes parquet floors, a fireplace with a carved mantel, walls with walnut-wood paneling, and plaster walls and ceilings.

As originally proposed, the administration building was supposed to be five stories high and measuring 200 by 200 feet (61 by 61 m), surrounding a courtyard with dimensions of 75 by 100 feet (23 by 30 m). The ground floor was to contain various living quarters, an officers' mess, a 600-person entertainment room, and a reception room. Above that, each of the regiments' companies would have their own floor, and a top-floor suite for the regiment's colonel.

=== Drill shed ===
The drill shed is 2 1/2 stories, with a clerestory level on the top story, and measures 300 feet (91 m) from west to east. Like the administration building, it contains a terracotta parapet, with a gable roof behind it. The northern and southern facades are articulated with vertical brick buttresses, which divide each facade into 15 vertical bays. On each facade, there is a central pavilion that measures three bays wide, as well as side pavilions that each measure six bays wide. The side entrances are framed with medieval-styled sandstone.

The interior features three tiers of balconies on all four sides with a seating capacity of 6,000–7,000. When it opened, the New York Age described it as having dimensions of 200 by 300 feet (61 by 91 m), with a gallery capacity of 5,000.

== See also ==
- List of armories and arsenals in New York City and surrounding counties
- List of New York City Designated Landmarks in Manhattan above 110th Street
- National Register of Historic Places listings in Manhattan above 110th Street
- Art Deco architecture of New York City
