= Elkan Naumburg =

American banker (1835–1924)

- Born: Elkan Naumburg; 1835; Treuchtlingen, Bavaria
- Died: 1924 (age 89)
- Occupations: Banker; Philanthropist; Musicologist
- Children: Walter Wehle Naumburg; George Washington Naumburg
- Family: William Gabriel Tachau (nephew); Elsie Margaret Binger Naumburg (daughter-in-law)

Elkan Naumburg (1835–1924) was a New York City merchant, banker, philanthropist and musicologist, best remembered for his sponsorship of the arts in Manhattan. From the last quarter of the nineteenth century, he used his wealth to promote public interest in symphonic and "semi-classical" music by helping to form and establish the Oratorio Society of New York and funding construction of the Naumburg Bandshell, which honors his name, on the Concert Ground of the Central Park Mall.

== Biography ==
Naumburg was born to a Jewish family in Treuchtlingen, Bavaria, on January 1, 1835, and emigrated with his parents to the United States at age 15 to escape the growing anti-Semitism of his native land. He studied violin twice a week two miles away, but never had time to make progress with the instrument then, as other obligations intervened. But it gave him his first love of music. He settled first in Baltimore, where he took a liking to chamber music. He lived there for 16 years, until 31 years old. An amateur pianist with no formal training, he was unable at that time to afford purchasing concert tickets for famous performers like Vieuxtemps and Thalberg.

In 1866, at age 31, he moved to New York City, where he initiated a business career that was first highlighted as a successful merchant and then a merchant banker. He founded E. Naumburg & Co. in 1893 - one of the largest 'commercial paper' banks on Wall Street. Their chief rival was Goldman Sachs.

The parlor of his Manhattan townhouse hosted pianists, opera singers and string quartets, and soon became a forum for celebrities of the music field. With his success he chose to make access to fine music available to a broader public in New York, as one of his principal legacies. In 1873, Leopold Damrosch founded the Oratorio Society of New York in the 'back parlor' of Elkan Naumburg's 48th Street home. Elkan's wife, gave it that name. Elkan, Bertha and Leopold were very good friends, and like Leopold, Elkan also gave one of his son's the name Walter. Richard Arnold (violinist), Leopold Damrosch, Marcella Sembrich, Theodore Thomas, and others performed weekly in the Naumburg family parlor during the 1870s, 80s, and 90s, entertaining such Gilded Age critics and artists as Henry Theophilus Finck and Albert Henry Krehbiel.

Elkan's own connection to the Oratorio Society of New York likely constituted some specific help as they went on to form the group, and he then served briefly on its board, when it first began. With Andrew Carnegie, E. Francis Hyde and James Loeb, Naumburg also defrayed the expense of bringing several European conductors to New York for the Philharmonic concerts, among them Tiedler and Baumgartner, Vassily Ilich Safonof and Édouard Colonne, Walter Wood and Willem Mengelberg, none of whom had ever previously appeared before American audiences.

Then, in 1890, Elkan Naumburg also founded the New York Philharmonic's first pension fund. Later he helped introduce renowned conductors like Vasily Ilyich Safonov and Willem Mengelberg to that orchestra.

He soon got the idea of presenting free symphonic concerts in Central Park. Patterned after concerts conducted by Theodore Thomas in the Central Park Garden, the Naumburg Orchestral Concerts commenced in 1905 and have continued without interruption ever since, almost always in Central Park. Today, they are the world's oldest continuous free outdoor classical music concert series. Originally performed on Central Park's Mall in an octagonal, pagoda-shaped bandstand designed by Jacob Wrey Mould, the programs featured popular waltzes, abbreviated operas, one or two movements of a symphony, or short arias, performed for audiences of strolling or picnicking Manhattanites, many of whom took to dancing as dusk fell and the gas lights came on.

In 1912, the old wood and cast iron bandstand was deemed inadequate, so Naumburg offered the city $125,000 to build a new bandshell of cast and Indiana limestone details. His nephew, the architect William Gabriel Tachau (1875–1969), designed the structure—an innovative half-dome on a high section of drum, which later came into frequent use—in 1916. Building began in 1921, and it opened on September 29, 1923, with a 60-piece orchestra conducted by Franz Kaltenborn playing selections from "Aida" and "Carmen", the William Tell Overture, the Blue Danube Waltz, and movements from Beethoven’s Fifth Symphony and Tchaikovsky's 1812 Overture. The concert closed with a new march—"On the Mall"—by Edwin Franko Goldman, dedicated to 88-year-old Elkan Naumburg, who was in attendance.

== Personal life and death ==
Naumburg was married to Bertha Wehle. On July 31, 1924, aged 89, Elkan Naumburg died after ‘a lingering illness’. He is now interred in the Naumburg family mausoleum designed by W. G. Tachau at Woodlawn Cemetery in The Bronx, New York City.

His sons Walter Wehle Naumburg (married to ornithologist Elsie Margaret Binger Naumburg) and George Washington Naumburg (married to Ruth Morgenthau, daughter of Henry Morgenthau Sr.) continued the free concerts in Central Park. Ruth M. Naumburg's cousin Robert E. Simon purchased Carnegie Hall from Louise Carnegie in 1925, and the Simon family retained it until 1960, when the building was saved. Elkan's son Walter continued and augmented the family tradition of supporting classical music by establishing the Walter W. Naumburg Prize in 1926. When he died, in 1959, the perpetuation of both the free Naumburg Orchestral Concerts in Central Park and the Walter W. Naumburg Foundation were endowed by a provision in his will.

Elkan's grandniece, Eleanor Naumburg Sanger, later co-founded WQXR-FM with her husband Elliott Sanger and John V. L. Hogan, New York's classical music radio station. Her role was as its music programmer, for 23 years, from 1936 on. "She came down to the office and started to work, and she remained for 23 years. For most of this time she was program director of the station and is as much responsible for the growth and accomplishments of WQXR as anyone....it was her enthusiasm and belief in our ultimate success that kept all of us determined to win out."

The niece of Ruth M. Naumburg [Ambassador Henry Morgenthau's daughter], married to George W. Naumburg [Elkan's 2nd child], Anne R. Wertheim [Alma Morgenthau Wertheim's daughter] married Robert E. Simon Jr. whose family [father and son ] owned Carnegie Hall from 1925 until 1960. Subsequently, the hall was saved by Isaac Stern and his colleagues on the Citizens Committee with the cooperation and understanding of Robert E. Simon Jr.. The City of New York purchased it, and Isaac Stern and Leonard Bernstein held a concert on September 27, 1960, to celebrate the event.

Elkan's grandson Philip Henry Naumburg helped found the Santa Fe Chamber Music Festival. See their Past Presidents list, [1977-78, 1985-86].

A great-grandson of Elkan Naumburg, Dr. Christopher Walter London, organized a public campaign and lawsuit that saved the Naumburg Bandshell on Central Park's Concert Ground from removal and destruction [1989-1993]. The lawsuit made case law. He currently runs the concert series as its President [since 1992] and foundation aided by a board of trustees, and with the public support of the 'Friends of the Naumburg Orchestral Concerts'.

== See also ==
- Maurice Wertheim
- Aaron & Nettie G. Naumburg see also Fogg Museum notice see also
- Margaret Naumburg
- Elliott M. Sanger
- Edward S. Naumburg, Jr.
- Eleanor Naumburg Sanger
- Carl T. Naumburg
