= Kingsbridge Armory =

Historic armory in the Bronx, New York

- Eighth Regiment Armory
- U.S. National Register of Historic Places
- New York State Register of Historic Places
- New York City Landmark
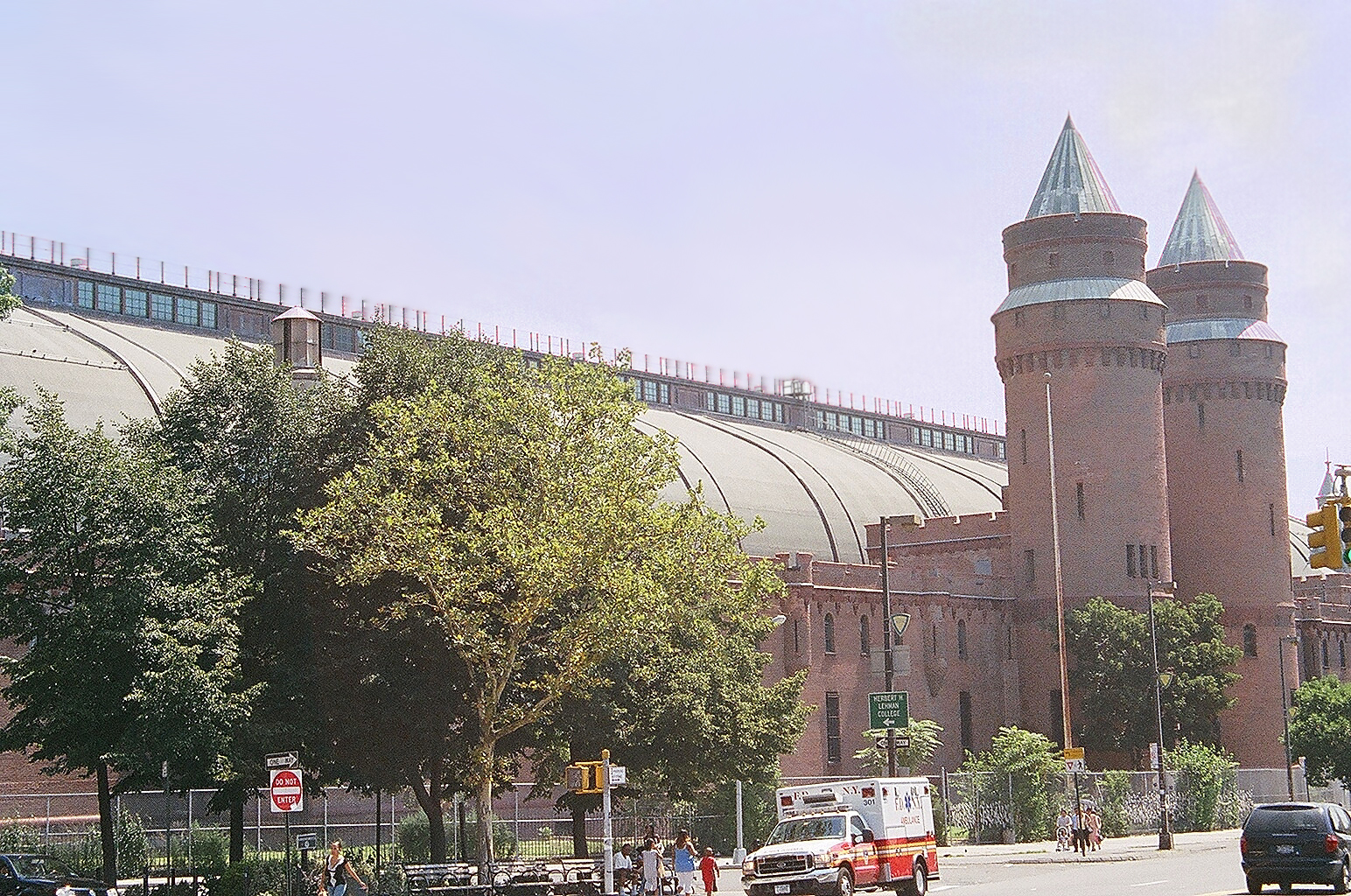
- partial south elevation, 2005
- Location: Kingsbridge Heights, Bronx, NY
- Coordinates: 40°52′04.46″N 73°53′54.81″W
- Area: 5 acres (2.0 ha)
- Built: 1917
- Architects: Pilcher & Tachau
- Architectural style: Romanesque
- NRHP reference No.: 82001090
- NYSRHP No.: 00501.000061
- NYCL No.: 0823

Significant dates
- Added to NRHP: December 21, 1982
- Designated NYSRHP: October 29, 1982
- Designated NYCL: September 24, 1974

The Kingsbridge Armory, also known as the Eighth Regiment Armory, is a decommissioned armory at Jerome Avenue and West Kingsbridge Road in the Kingsbridge Heights neighborhood of the Bronx in New York City. It was built in the 1910s, from a design by the firm of then-state architect Lewis Pilcher to house the New York National Guard's Eighth Coast Defense Command (258th Field Artillery Regiment after November 1921), a regiment-sized unit which relocated from Manhattan in 1917. It is possibly the largest armory in the world.

In addition to its military function, it has been used over the years for exhibitions, boxing matches, and a film set. After World War II the city offered it to the United Nations as a temporary meeting place. In 1974 it was designated a city landmark, and eight years later it was listed on the National Register of Historic Places. Its military use ended and it was turned over to city management in 1996. Since then it has remained vacant as various proposals to redevelop it have failed. One such proposal, by the administration of former Mayor Michael Bloomberg, turned into a dispute over living wage policies. In 2013, a new plan to redevelop it as the world's largest indoor ice center was announced, called the Kingsbridge National Ice Center, but this plan failed in 2021. Another redevelopment plan was approved by the New York City Council in 2025. One National Guard unit has continued to use an annex in the rear until a new headquarters can be found.

== Site ==
The armory complex occupies almost the entire 5-acre (2.0 ha) block between West Kingsbridge Road on the south, Jerome Avenue on the east, West 195th Street on the north, and Reservoir Avenue on the west. Above Jerome Avenue is the Kingsbridge Road station on the New York City Subway's 4 train, from which the armory is visible.

An empty moat runs across the front entrance of the building. There are parking lots and sidewalks along the side. At the center of the northern side are two smaller buildings: a garage, as well as a locker room and classrooms. Both are considered non-contributing to the Register listing.

On the north are public schools 86 and 340, with Jerome Park Reservoir to the northwest and Lehman College of the City University of New York about a block north. On the other three sides is dense urban mixed-use development. St. James Park is a few blocks to the southeast, and the James J. Peters VA Medical Center, overlooking the Harlem River and Major Deegan Expressway (Interstate 87), two blocks to the east. The terrain slopes slightly toward the river.

== Architecture ==
=== Exterior ===
The building is a nine-story red brick edifice with a curved, sloping metal roof, with corrugated fiberglass panels in the field at either end. Its brickwork has been considered among the city's finest. Stone is used for trim, especially around the slit windows at regular intervals. A corbeled stone string course runs below the parapeted roof the length of the building. Above the corbels, and at the corners, are turrets.

In the middle of the south elevation is the two-story office wing and main entrance, a section known as the headhouse. Two semi-engaged towers with conical roofs rise at its front above the roofline. The transition to the office wing from the main wall is marked by angled walls, two low round towers with conical roofs and cupolas and two square towers.

Between them is the main entrance, a round arch with heavy iron gates and paneled double doors with stone steps and walls. They are topped with a stone projection on corbels and a crenellated parapet. In the brick above the entrance is the regimental motif in terra cotta, a shield over an eagle with draped flags.

=== Interior ===
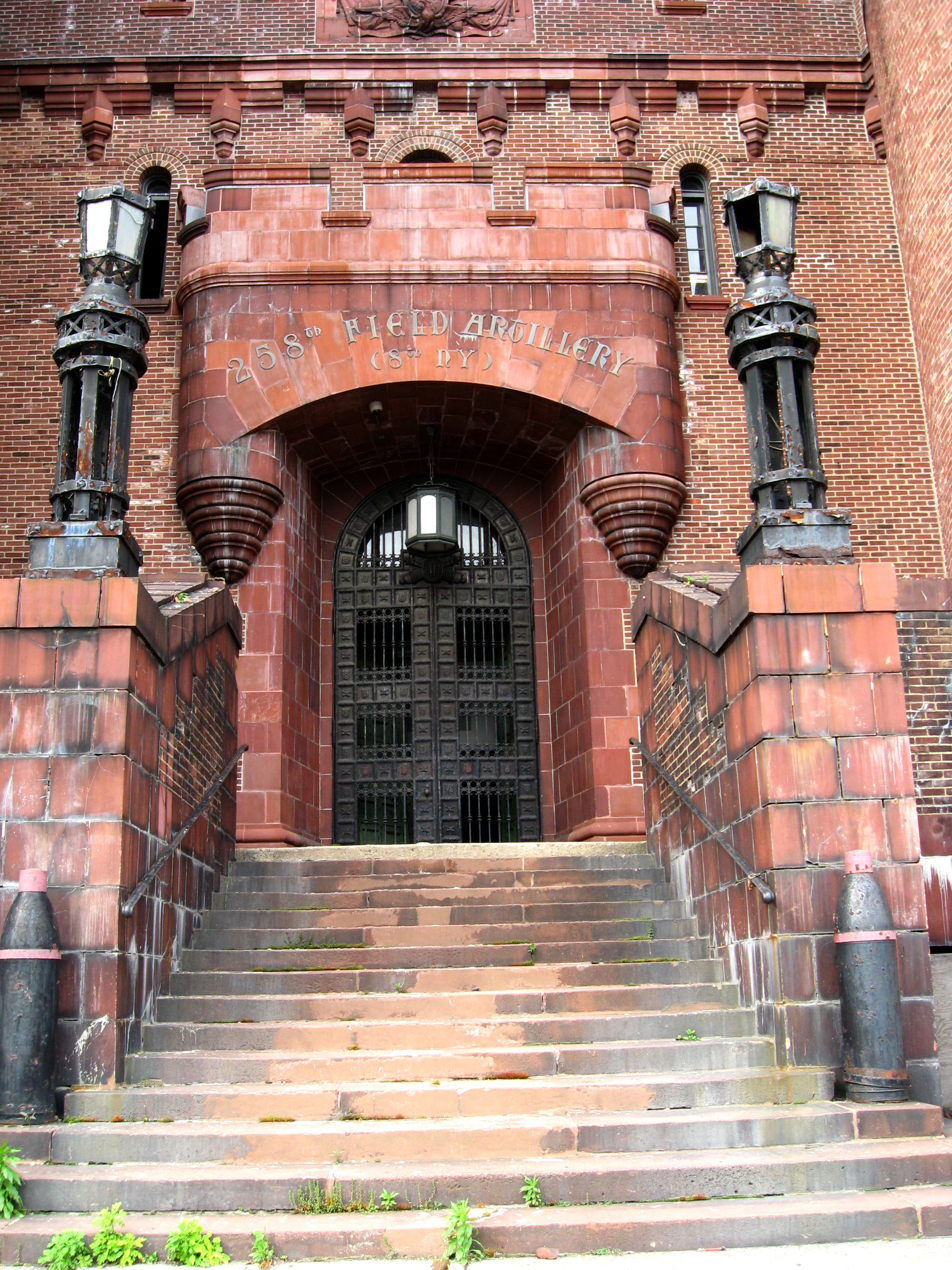
Main entrance

Inside is a 180,000-square-foot (17,000 m^{2}) drill hall and an 800-seat auditorium. A four-centered double truss 100 feet (30 m) high spans the ceiling. Two cellar levels, which used to house military vehicles, also provide space for storage, lecture halls, and fitness rooms, that included a basketball court and a 400-foot (120 m) shooting range.

In the office wing, the entry hall has square brick piers supporting the segmental arches that frame the groin vaults. Brick quoins decorate the piers and intrados. The commander's office, upstairs, is done in the Colonial Revival style, with engaged columns, fielded panel walls and an Adamesque fireplace mantel.

=== Aesthetics ===
Architect Lewis Pilcher's design was an engineering feat, probably inspired by the large trainsheds of contemporary railroad stations. Six years after its 1917 completion, the Architectural Record described it as epitomizing "simplicity, directness, convenience, and adaptation to special requirements". The Record quoted Pilcher himself as saying it was "perhaps the most interesting of all the armory designs in the country. The necessities of mobilization ... were successfully met."

Subsequently, it has been described as "schizoid", appearing as "two distinct and incongruous buildings." The medieval architecture of the office wing echoed social concerns of the 1880s, when the National Guard was frequently called out to suppress civil unrest such as strikes. The towers and crenellation suggested the authority and power of the military of an earlier time.

By the early 1910s, the Guard was more integrated with the Army, and their units became more focused on national defense purposes, training and equipping for the battlefield instead of the streets. The design of the drill shed reflects this changing function, its steel and glass making the whole a stylistic hybrid similar to the Brooklyn Bridge and the 1901 Squadron C Armory in Brooklyn, also designed by Pilcher's firm, the first armory in which the steel drill hall is a prominent element when seen from the outside. "It points toward a moment when historical ornament will be stripped away," writes David Bady of Lehman College, "leaving engineering to be admired as architecture."

== History ==
=== The Eighth Regiment ===
The Eighth Regiment, New York State Militia traces its lineage from units constituted in 1786. Since it was part of the honor guard at George Washington's inauguration, it later acquired the informal name of the Washington Greys. The Eighth Regiment now has descendants in the 258th Field Artillery. Since 1895, it had been based at the old Squadron A Armory on Park Avenue in Manhattan.

In 1911 the New York State Legislature authorized the construction of a new armory using what had already been excavated as the planned eastern basin for Jerome Park Reservoir. Some military artifacts were unearthed, probably from the nearby sites of Revolutionary War forts Independence and Number Five, but no formal archeological survey was done. The firm of Lewis Pilcher, who became state architect two years later, was commissioned.

=== Use as armory ===
During World War II the armory was active in the war effort. Herbert Lehman, a former governor and U.S. Senator, ceremonially reviewed 10,000 troops there at a 1942 event. It was one of the few registration sites in the city for immigrants from enemy nations. After the war the city offered it to the United Nations General Assembly as a temporary meeting place until the main UN building was finished.

In 1957 the two rear buildings were constructed. It was designated a city landmark in 1974. At that time the city's Landmarks Preservation Commission called it "an outstanding example of military architecture." Over the years following, the main armory building was neglected, and by the 1990s, the Guard units who called it home were running most of their operations from the annex buildings on West 195th.

For a period in the 1980s it was used as a homeless shelter. In 1994, one of the community school districts proposed that new schools be built on the site. The state Division of Military and Naval Affairs transferred title to the armory and its property to New York City two years later, whereupon the city began trying to find a new location for two of the three units that trained at the armory.

=== Redevelopment proposals ===
==== Early proposals ====
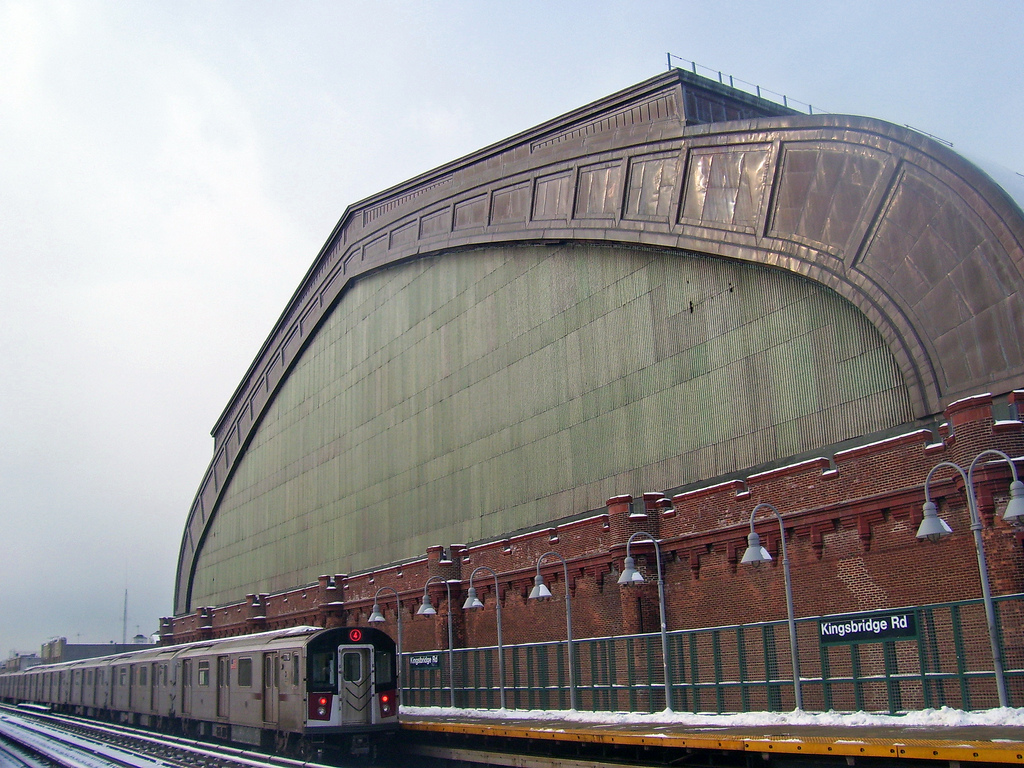
East profile of armory from the subway station at Kingsbridge Road and Jerome Avenue

As early as 1994, community activists had advocated for all or some of the armory to be adapted for school use, due to overcrowding of other nearby schools. Local opposition in 2000 stopped a redevelopment plan that did not include schools. Afterwards, they persuaded the city to spend $31 million replacing the armory's roof and making other repairs.

After all Guard units save the 258th Field Artillery Regiment, the descendant of the original Eighth Regiment, left, the city gave a grant to a local nonprofit, the Bronx Overall Economic Development Corporation (BOEDC), to come up with a plan for reuse and redevelopment. It was estimated that structural repairs alone would cost as much as $40 million. Proposals ranged from the school plan to one from City Councilman G. Oliver Koppell to develop it into an amateur athletic center. A BOEDC official likened the process to "dealing with several buildings in one."

The armory had always been available for temporary uses. Over the years it had hosted dog and boat shows, as well as boxing matches. In 2006 Warner Bros. rented the armory for six months to make the Will Smith film I Am Legend. It was used for both preproduction and principal photography, with sets built for scenes set in Washington Square Park. The music video for the song "Just Tonight" by rock band The Pretty Reckless was filmed at the armory in 2010.

==== Controversies and changes ====
In 2008, as the city prepared to announce the winning bidder, local activists, community groups and labor unions formed the Kingsbridge Armory Redevelopment Alliance (KARA) to pressure the city for a Community Benefits Agreement (CBA) as part of the project. A CBA would have required living wage provisions and union representation not only for any construction work but for jobs with any tenants. KARA also sought to have schools included in the plan, which city officials said was impossible.

The winning bidder, The Related Companies, pledged to invest $310 million in redeveloping the armory into a shopping mall complex. The company already had negotiated a CBA for its Gateway Center at Bronx Terminal Market, but never reached any agreement with KARA for the armory, saying its wage demands would have made it impossible to attract tenants. Concerns were also raised about traffic issues a mall might create. In 2009, opposition was strong enough that when the city's Planning Commission approved the project, the vote by the usually unanimous body split 8-4 with one abstention, with representatives appointed by the Manhattan and Queens borough presidents joined their Bronx counterpart and the Public Advocate's representative.

In 2010 the full City Council rejected the plan by 45-1, with one abstention. Mayor Michael Bloomberg expressed disappointment that the proposal had failed, one of the rare redevelopment proposals from his administration to suffer that fate. The mayor's veto was overridden 48-1, with an abstention, a week later. Related blamed its failure on KARA's wage demands. The activist group said it was "one step closer to achieving a redeveloped Armory that truly benefits the community." Residents of the area were defiant. "We're not suckers in the Bronx," one said. "We're not going to take whatever somebody is offering." Some said they felt the neighborhood needed schools more than malls. Bronx Borough President Ruben Diaz, Jr., made the defeat of Related's plan the starting point of a campaign to get living-wage legislation enacted citywide for taxpayer-subsidized projects. Bloomberg later blocked plans to move the Guard unit still at the armory to another facility in the borough, and advocated for opening a homeless shelter in the other annex building, a move perceived as retaliation. Governor-elect Andrew Cuomo named Diaz to his transition team on economic development, which was also seen as a message to Bloomberg.

Efforts to plan a redevelopment of the armory continue. In fall of 2010, Diaz's office retained graduate students and faculty in the Capstone Program at New York University's Wagner School of Public Service to develop a plan. Diaz later skipped a meeting with Bloomberg's deputies as a protest against the mayor's plan to use the armory as one of several new homeless shelters.

==== 2010s proposals ====
In 2012 a new redevelopment proposal was announced. A Deutsche Bank group proposed what it claimed would be the world's largest indoor ice rink complex, called the Kingsbridge National Ice Center (KNIC), with nine ice rinks and 5,000 seat ice hockey arena in. Two New York skating stars, New York Rangers icon Mark Messier and Olympic gold medalist Sarah Hughes, served as spokespeople. Diaz has given it his endorsement as well, although residents of the area were less enthusiastic. After review by the New York City Economic Development Corporation (NYCEDC), Bloomberg and Messier appeared at a press conference in April 2013 to announce the city and the developers had reached a deal, which still required the approval of council. The ice center was approved in 2013, but because KNIC did not have sufficient financing, the NYCEDC did not agree to transfer the lease until May 2017. By 2018, KNIC had raised $35 million of private funds and Citibank was planning to provide the rest of the $170 million needed for the project.

During the time that the armory has stood empty, it has been used as an emergency supply and food distribution center during disasters. The armory was used for such purposes after Hurricane Sandy in 2012 and the COVID-19 pandemic in New York City in 2020. By March 2021, the ice center was still being planned, but the work had not yet begun. The plan to redevelop the Kingsbridge Heights site fell through at the end of 2021 when New York City finally terminated its contract with Kingsbridge National Ice Center. A New York Supreme Court ruling gave the NYCEDC full ownership of the armory after KNIC failed for eight years to secure proper funding for the space's development.

==== 2020s proposals ====
By October 2022, the NYCEDC was again soliciting proposals for the redevelopment of the Kingsbridge Armory. Local community groups advocated for the NYCEDC to allow them to become more involved in the armory's redevelopment. New York City Council speaker Adrienne Adams allocated $5 million for the site's development to Pierina Sanchez, the councilperson for the City Council's 14th District, which included the armory. Another plan for redevelopment was announced in August 2023, when governor Kathy Hochul and mayor Eric Adams announced that the city and state would give $200 million in grant funds for unspecified renovations of the armory. Amid concerns from local business owners who feared being evicted after the armory was redeveloped, the city began soliciting proposals from investors. The bids included a proposal by the Northwest Bronx Community and Clergy Coalition to construct spaces for manufacturing, food service, and live performances.

The city selected a bid from 8th Regiment Partners LLC (a partnership between Joy Construction Corporation and Maddd Equities) in January 2025. The plans called for community space, sports facilities, event space, commercial space, and 450 housing units. The project received $12 million from the City Council, $2 million from the borough president's office, and more than $1 million from the federal government. One of the losing bidders, Agallas Equities, sued that March, claiming that 8th Regiment Partners had been awarded the bid because of favoritism from city government officials. That June, 8th Regiment Partners announced that local group Northwest Bronx Community & Clergy Coalition would take over about 120,000 square feet (11,000 m^{2}), or one-fifth of the armory. In July 2025, the Landmarks Preservation Commission approved the redevelopment plan, and Borough President Vanessa Gibson's office also approved the plan. The City Council approved the redevelopment plan in late October.

== See also ==
- List of armories and arsenals in New York City and surrounding counties
- List of New York City Designated Landmarks in the Bronx
- National Register of Historic Places listings in the Bronx
