= Night Owls (vocal group) =

Vassar College a cappella group

The Night Owls (also known as the "Owls") is the oldest continuous women's and genderqueer a cappella group in the United States. Formed in 1942, they are Vassar College's oldest a cappella group. The Night Owls are a soprano/alto jazz ensemble that performs a range of music from jazz standards to current pop hits to indie-folk music.

== History ==
The Night Owls perform in all-black to honor the tradition of the group's founding. In the midst of a polio outbreak in 1942, sixteen students left their quarantined dormitories, dressed in black, and sneaked into the library basement at night to perform for their classmates.

The group performs throughout Vassar's academic year including at final concerts in December and May, local fundraisers, joint concerts with other Vassar and non-Vassar a cappella groups, and Vassar events. Alumnae of the group include actress Meryl Streep.

In 1996, The Night Owls performed as the opening act for Hillary Clinton when she spoke at Vassar College. The group had been invited to sing at the inauguration of Bill Clinton in January 1993, but were unable to appear until Clinton's second inauguration. That same year, The Night Owls competed in the semi-finals of the International Championship of Collegiate A Cappella (ICCA) at Haverford College. While they did not move onto the finals at Lincoln Center in New York City, then-musical director Amanda Weeden 1997 won “Best Soloist” for her performance of Captain and Tennille's “Love Will Keep Us Together,” beating out the University of Pennsylvania Counterparts’ soloist John Stephens, better known today as John Legend.

In 2001, The Night Owls appeared in an episode of Comedy Central Presents featuring Zach Galifianakis singing "Eternal Flame" originally by The Bangles.

== Partial Discography ==
- Night & Day (1993, with The Accidentals)
- On The Air (1995)
- After Dark (1997)
- All-Nighter
- Relax
- Constellation
