= Williams House (Vassar College) =

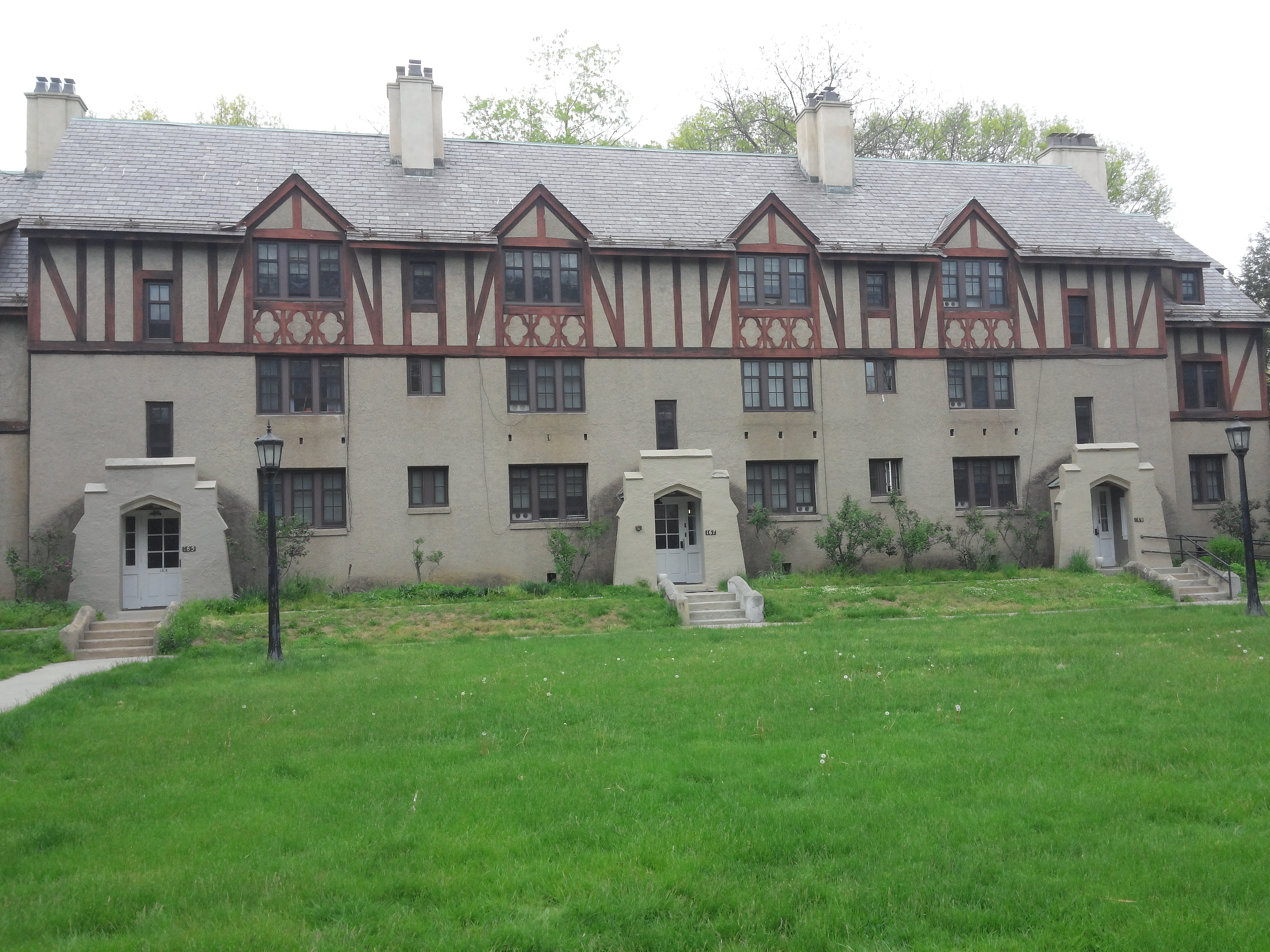
- Alternative names: Williams Hall

General information
- Architectural style: Tudor Revival
- Location: Poughkeepsie, New York
- Named for: Harriet Trumbull Williams
- Completed: 1925
- Opened: 1922
- Demolished: August 2022
- Owner: Vassar College

Technical details
- Floor count: 3

Design and construction
- Architecture firm: Hunt & Hunt

Other information
- Number of units: 21

Williams House (historically Williams Hall) was part of Vassar College in the town of Poughkeepsie, New York. It was constructed as the college's first building for housing female faculty. In 2019, the college proposed demolishing Williams House to build the parking lot for a new 50-room conference hotel, open to the public, to the objection of residents and community members. The building was demolished in 2022.

== History ==
In 1910, President Taylor said that the college required an apartment house that "would give the women of our faculty an independence and a freedom from the constant calls of student life." Harriet Trumbull Williams of Vassar's class of 1870 donated $100,000 for this purpose, saying she "wished to contribute to the welfare of women. No group of professional workers seem to be more worthy of recognition through increased comfort in living conditions than those who have faithfully served Vassar College as professors and instructors".

Williams Hall was built under the presidency of Henry Noble MacCracken. Both Williams Hall and Alumnae House, located above it, were designed by the architects Hunt & Hunt.

The first residents moved into the central building in spring 1922. Notable initial residents included C. Mildred Thompson, Vassar's second dean, and Harriet Isabel Ballintine, a pioneer in women's physical education.

The east and west wings, which were part of the original design, were completed in 1925. Dean Thompson moved into the first floor of the east wing. The first floor of the west wing was used for a dining room for the residents.

== Preservation efforts and demolition ==
In 2019, Vassar proposed demolition of Williams as part of its plan to build an Inn and Institute on the Alumnae House lawn, using the site of Williams for a parking lot. This proposed project was funded principally by an anonymous donation.

While in July 2020, Vassar's President Bradley announced that Williams would be demolished by "early October", the required zoning and planning permissions have not been granted as of December 2020.

On October 30, the Town of Poughkeepsie Historic Preservation Commission unanimously recommended that Williams be designated as a local historic landmark, writing "Taking Williams away from this well-intentioned and carefully-planned for corner of the Town of Poughkeepsie, would leave a needless wound on the land and the history of Arlington ... preserving this picturesque and stately corner of our Town for future generations makes it, and Williams Hall, worthy to be protected and landmarked." While landmark designation was supported by the town's Historic Preservation Commission and by the Town Board member representing Ward 6 (where Williams is located), the Board as a whole rejected the application. Ultimately, the building was demolished in August 2022.
