= Peter Stillman =

Peter Stillman may refer to:

- Peter Stillman (academic), professor of political science at Vassar College
- Peter Stillman, a character from the Paul Auster novel City of Glass
- Peter Stillman (Metal Gear), a character from the Metal Gear video game series
