= The Miscellany News =

Student newspaper of Vassar College

- "Vassar College's newspaper of record since 1866"

- The November 4, 2010 front page
- Type: Weekly student newspaper
- School: Vassar College
- Founded: 1866
- Headquarters: The Miscellany News; Vassar College Box 149; Poughkeepsie, NY 12604
- Website: miscellanynews.org

The Miscellany News (known colloquially as The Misc) is the student newspaper of Vassar College. Established in 1866, it is one of the oldest student newspapers in the United States. The paper is distributed every Thursday during Vassar's academic year to locations across the College's campus, including dormitories, dining and athletic facilities, and communal areas. The paper accepts contributions from all members of the college community—students, administrators, faculty, staff, alumnae/i and trustees—and has a regular staff of roughly 40 to 50 student editors, reporters, photojournalists, multimedia correspondents and designers. In addition to its print publication, the staff also publishes articles on its website.

== History ==
The Miscellany News was first published under the name Vassariana on June 27, 1866. The four-page long issue was meant to be a retrospective of the College's first year, more of a yearbook than the student newspaper which it would become. "Now we lay down the editorial pen," read the conclusion of the paper's first editorial, "believing it will be taken up by those who will carry on the work we have begun; who, although the foundations are of a rough stone, will build above with polished marble, and who will maintain the Vassariana in the front ranks of the college papers in the land."

The paper—one of the first student organizations at Vassar—did indeed grow to be the publication for which the charter editors had hoped. By 1872, the paper was renamed the Vassar Miscellany, as it was originally meant to be a mix—or miscellanea—of reporting, essays and poems. Though in its first years the paper published mostly the latter two genres, by the 1890s— with further funding for student organizations from new President of the College James Monroe Taylor—the Miscellany adjusted its focus to journalism. The paper made this transition complete on February 6, 1914, with the historic publication of its first issue as a weekly paper.

The newspaper's 150-year history is chronicled in the book Covering the Campus: A History of the Miscellany News at Vassar College, written by Brian Farkas, a member of the Class of 2010 and Editor-in-Chief of its 142nd Volume. The book begins with a foreword by Catharine Bond Hill, the College's 10th President.

== Modern Miscellany ==
=== Overview ===
Today, The Miscellany News continues in the tradition started by the editors of 1914, publishing every Thursday morning of Vassar's academic year. The paper is typically 16 pages long each week and consists of six sections—News, Features, Opinions, Humor, Arts and Sports—which each contain innovative and professionally reported pieces concerning issues of interest on and off campus. The paper's staff consists entirely of Vassar students. Though roughly 40 undergraduates contribute to each issue of the Miscellany, Editorial Board members work most closely with the paper, developing story ideas, assigning articles and helping to shape the finished product; in addition to directing the daily operations of the paper, the Editor-in-Chief and the Upper Executive Board work to guide the overall direction of the news organization.

=== Online ===
Two years after it received its first e-mail address, The Miscellany News went online in 1996. Today—after establishing its own domain independent from the Vassar College Web site in the summer of 2008—the Miscellany updates its site with online articles. In the fall of 2009, the paper announced the launch of five blogs, which would complement its regular online and print content. While the print publication has a regular circulation of 800 copies, the Web site receives over 14,000 page impressions each week.

== Editors-in-chief ==
Name	Term	Grad. year
Emma Brown	Fall 2026	2027
Allison Lowe	Spring 2026	2026
Carina Cole	Fall 2025	2026
Allen Hale	Spring 2025	2025
Charlotte Robertson	Fall 2024	2025
Maryam Bacchus	Spring 2024	2025
Jacques Abou-Rizk	Fall 2023	2025
Nina Ajemian	Spring 2023	2023
Leila Raines	Fall 2022	2023
Janet Song	Spring 2022	2023
Olivia Watson	Fall 2021	2022
Ted Chmyz	Spring 2021	2021
Lucy Leonard	Fall 2020	2022
Jessica Moss	Spring 2020	2021
Mack Liederman	Fall 2019	2020
Leah Cates	Spring 2019	2020
Talya Phelps	Fall 2018	2019

== Notable alumni ==
Many professional journalists, writers and politicians started at The Miscellany News, including:

- Edna St. Vincent Millay '17, American lyrical poet and playwright, first woman to receive the Pulitzer Prize for Poetry.
- Elizabeth Bishop '33, American poet and writer, was the Poet Laureate of the United States from 1949 to 1950 and a Pulitzer Prize winner in 1956
- Mary Therese McCarthy '33, American author, critic and political activist
- Rick Lazio '80, former U.S. Representative (R) from the State of New York and former Republican nominee for U.S. Senate and candidate for Governor of New York
- Neil Strauss '91, American author and journalist, best known for his best-selling work The Game: Penetrating the Secret Society of Pickup Artists
- Alexandra Berzon '01, won the Pulitzer Prize for her work with the Las Vegas Sun and currently works at The Wall Street Journal
