= Frances D. Fergusson =

President of Vassar College from 1986 to 2006

Frances Daly Fergusson
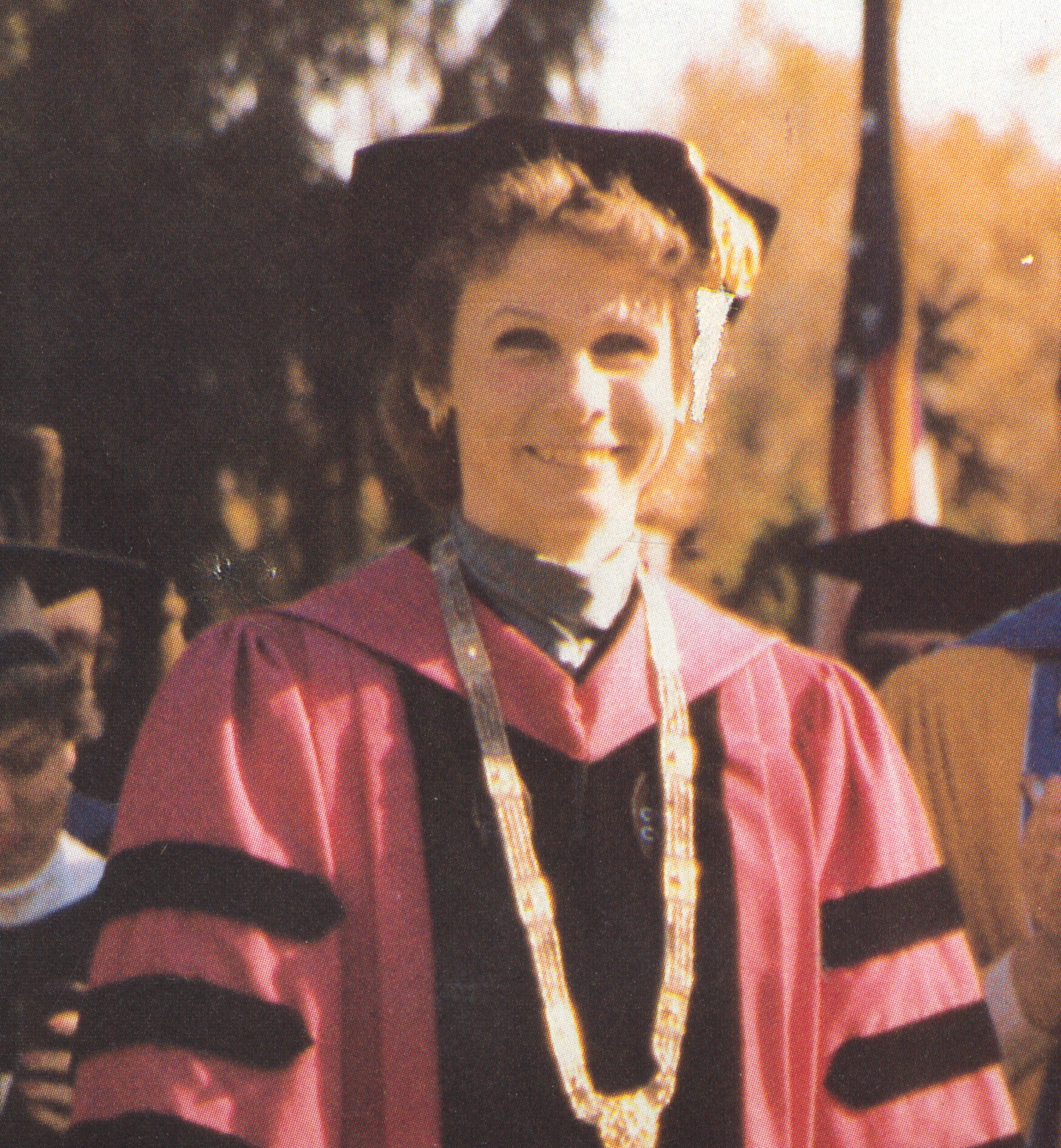
- Fergusson c. 1986

9th President of Vassar College
- In office 1986–2006
- Preceded by: Virginia B. Smith
- Succeeded by: Catharine Bond Hill

Personal details
- Born: Boston, Massachusetts, US
- Education: Harvard University; Wellesley College
- Profession: Art historian, college president

Frances Daly Fergusson (born October 3, 1944) served as president of Vassar College from 1986 to 2006. A graduate of Wellesley College, Fergusson earned her AM and PhD in Art History at Harvard University before starting her teaching career at Newton College.

== Life ==
Frances Daly Fergusson was born in Boston, Massachusetts.

In 1975, she began teaching at University of Massachusetts at Boston, where she later became assistant chancellor. Fergusson continued her career in academic administration from 1982 until 1986 at Bucknell University, where she served as Provost and Vice President of the university. She left Bucknell to become Vassar's president. Fergusson has published extensively in the field of architectural history, including an award-winning article on the iconography of St. Charles' Church in Vienna.

She raised more than $750 million for Vassar College. Her administration oversaw extensive renovation of the campus, including refurbishment of the library, the creation of a new art center, and construction of a modern drama and film center. Both the Frances Lehman Loeb Art Center and the Vogelstein Center for Drama and Film were designed by architect Cesar Pelli.

While serving as Vassar's president, Fergusson was a member of the Boards of Trustees of the Ford Foundation from (1989–2001), and the Mayo Foundation/Mayo Clinic from 1988 to 2002. She was chair of the board of the Mayo Clinic from 1998 to 2002. She has also served on the boards of the National Association of Independent Colleges and Universities (NAICU), the Foreign Policy Association, The Noguchi Museum, WNET/Thirteen, and the Society of Architectural Historians of the United States. She was a member of the boards of the Getty Trust, The Ringling Museum of Art, the National Council on the Humanities, and The Foundation for Contemporary Arts.

Currently, she also serves on the boards of The School of American Ballet, Second Stage Theater, The American Council of Learned Societies and the Sarasota Opera. She is also a member of the Board of Trust of the American Academy of Arts and Sciences. She was elected to the American Academy in 2002.

In the corporate world, she served on the boards of Pfizer and Mattel, Wyeth Pharmaceuticals, Central Hudson Gas and Electric Corporation and HSBC Bank USA.

On February 16, 2005, Fergusson announced her intention to step down as president of Vassar College after twenty years as head of the institution. Catharine Bond Hill assumed the position of president at the end of the 2005-2006 academic year.

At her graduate alma mater, Harvard, she was the president of the Board of Overseers from 2007 to 2008 and served on the search committee that brought Drew Faust to the presidency of Harvard. She received the Centennial Medal from the Graduate School of Arts and Sciences at Harvard and the Harvard Medal for Outstanding Service to the University.

== Awards ==
- Doctor of Literature degrees (honorary) from the University of London
- Centennial Medal of the Graduate School of Arts and Sciences, Harvard University (1999)
- Honorary doctoral degrees from Bard College, and the University of Hartford
- Harvard Medal for "outstanding service to the University"
