= Virginia B. Smith =

President of Vassar College from 1977 to 1986

Virginia Beatrice Smith
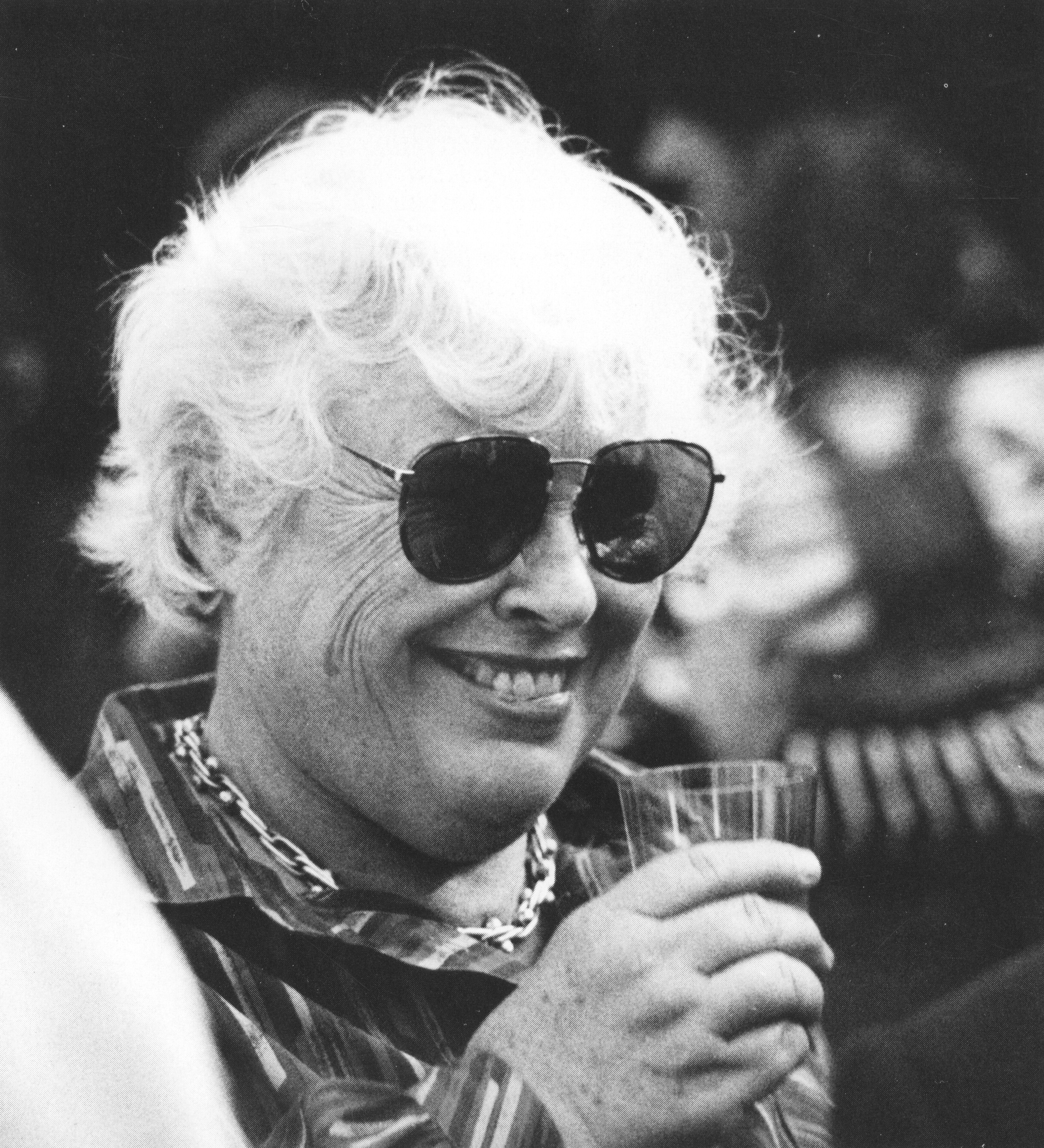
- Smith shortly before her retirement from Vassar College in 1986

8th President of Vassar College
- In office 1977–1986
- Preceded by: Alan Simpson
- Succeeded by: Frances D. Fergusson

Personal details
- Born: June 24, 1923 Seattle, Washington, US
- Died: August 27, 2010 (aged 87) Alamo, California, US
- Domestic partner: Florence Oaks
- Education: University of Washington
- Profession: Lawyer, economist, educator, college president

Virginia Beatrice Smith (June 24, 1923 – August 27, 2010) was an American lawyer, economist, educator, and eighth president of Vassar College. Smith is the namesake of the Virginia B. Smith Innovative Leadership Award of the Council for Adult and Experiential Learning and the National Center for Public Policy and Higher Education.

== Biography ==
Smith was born in Seattle, Washington, in 1923 and earned a bachelor's and law degree from the University of Washington, entering as an undergraduate at 16 years old.

Smith taught business courses at Berkeley in 1952, partly at the request of Clark Kerr, the former president of the University of California system. In 1965, Smith became the first woman assistant vice-president of Berkeley.

In 1963 Smith served as an associate director for the Carnegie Commission on Higher Education. President Richard Nixon appointed Smith the director of the Fund for the Improvement of Postsecondary Education in 1973.

Vassar College, previously an all-women's institution, admitted male transfer students in the Spring of 1969, and amended its constitution to permit male students to matriculate to Vassar. Appointed in 1977, Smith was the first president throughout whose term Vassar was entirely co-educational. Smith served as the president of Vassar College until 1986.

In 1990 Smith became president of Mills College in California after the College's trustees had moved to admit men to the college. The trustees reversed their decision, which Smith supported.
