= Vassar College =

Private college in Poughkeepsie, New York, US

- Type: Private liberal arts college
- Established: 1861; 165 years ago
- Academic affiliations: Annapolis Group; CLAC; COFHE; NAICU; Oberlin Group
- Endowment: $1.39 billion (2025)
- President: Elizabeth H. Bradley
- Faculty: 312 FT/ 55 PT (2024)
- Undergraduates: 2,462 (2024)
- Location: Poughkeepsie, New York, U.S. 41°41′15″N 73°53′45″W
- Campus: Suburban, 1,000 acres (400 ha)
- Newspaper: The Miscellany News
- Colors: Burgundy and gray
- Nickname: Brewers
- Sporting affiliations: NCAA Division III – Liberty League
- Mascot: The Brewer
- Website: vassar.edu

Vassar College (/ˈvæsər/ VASS-ər) is a private liberal arts college in the town of Poughkeepsie, New York, United States. Founded in 1861 by Matthew Vassar, it was the second degree-granting institution of higher education for women in the United States. The college became coeducational in 1969. The college offers BA degrees in more than fifty majors. Vassar College's varsity sports teams, known as the Brewers, play in the NCAA Division III as members of the Liberty League. As of 2023, there are close to 2,500 students.

The college is one of the historic Seven Sisters. The Vassar campus comprises over 1,000 acres (400 ha) and more than 100 buildings. A designated arboretum, the campus features more than 200 species of trees, a native plant preserve, and a 530-acre (210 ha) ecological preserve.

== History ==
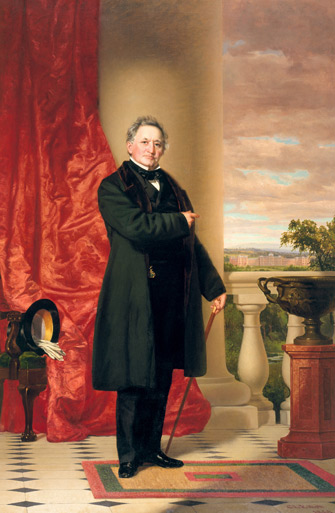
An 1861 oil portrait of Matthew Vassar by Charles Loring Elliott

Vassar was founded as a women's school under the name "Vassar Female College" in 1861. Its first president was Milo P. Jewett, who had previously been first president of another women's school, Judson College; he led a staff of ten professors and twenty-one instructors. After one year, its founder, Matthew Vassar, had the word Female removed from the name, prompting some local residents of Poughkeepsie, New York, to quip that its founder believed it might one day admit male students. The college became coeducational in 1969.

Vassar was the second of the Seven Sisters colleges, higher education schools that were strictly for women, and historically sister institutions to the all-male Ivy League colleges. It was chartered by its namesake, brewer Matthew Vassar, in 1861 in the Hudson Valley, about 70 miles (110 km) north of New York City. The first person appointed to the Vassar faculty was astronomer Maria Mitchell, in 1865.

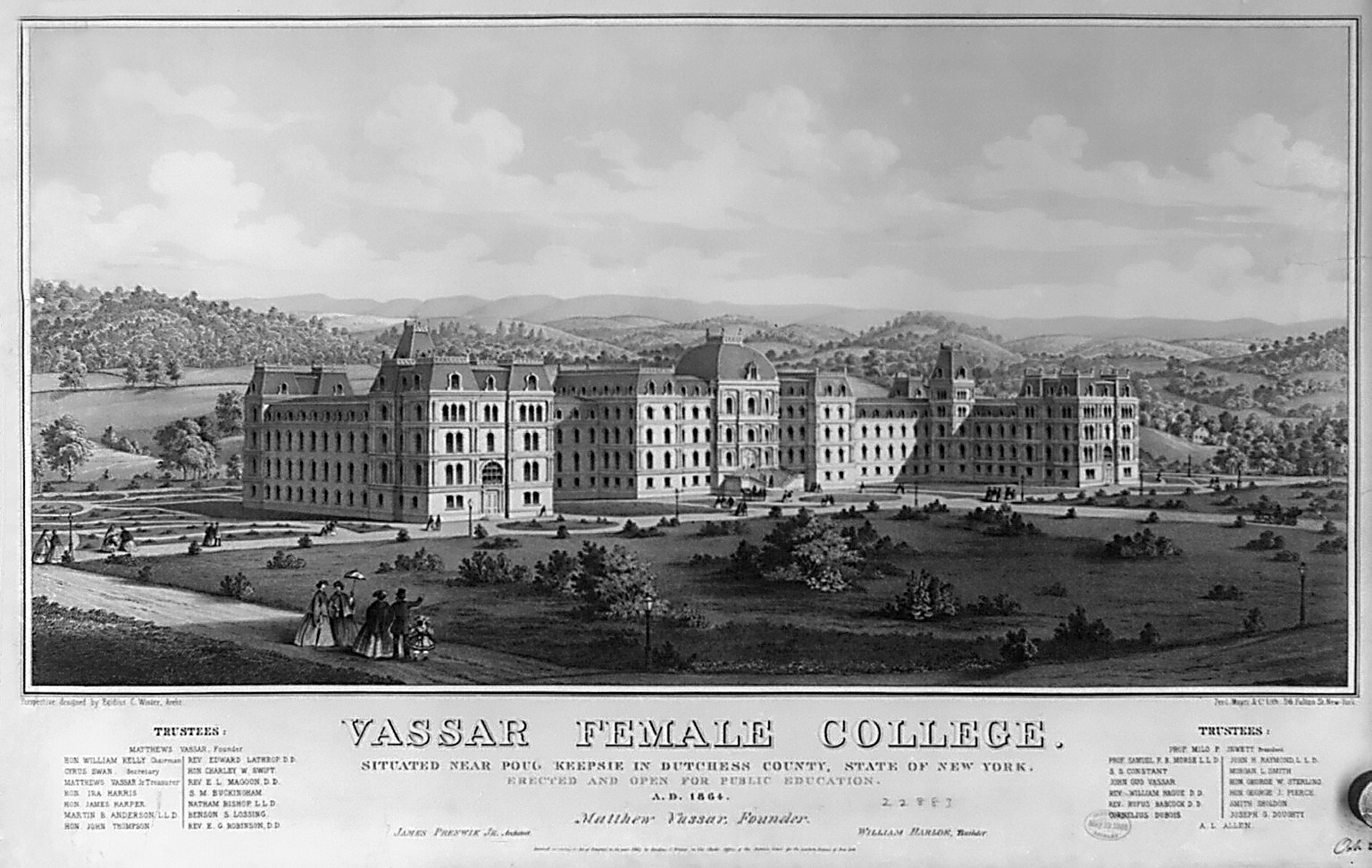
The Main Building, built in 1861 by architect James Renwick Jr., had the most interior space of any building in the United States, until the United States Capitol was completed in 1868.

Vassar adopted coeducation in 1969. Immediately following World War II, Vassar accepted a small number of male students on the G.I. Bill. The formal decision to become co-ed came after its trustees declined an offer to merge with Yale University, its sibling institution, in the wave of mergers between the historically all-male colleges of the Ivy League and their Seven Sisters counterparts.

In its early years, Vassar was associated with the social elite of the Protestant establishment. E. Digby Baltzell writes that "upper-class WASP families educated their children at colleges such as Harvard, Princeton, Yale, and Vassar." A select and elite few of Vassar's students were allowed entry into the school's secret society Delta Sigma Rho, founded in 1922. Before becoming President of the United States, Franklin Delano Roosevelt was a Trustee.

Approximately 2,450 students attend Vassar, and 98% live on campus. About 60% come from public high schools, and 40% come from private schools (both independent and religious). Vassar is currently 56% women and 44% men, at national average for national liberal arts colleges. Students are taught by more than 336 faculty members, virtually all holding the doctorate degree or its equivalent. The student-faculty ratio is 8:1, average class size, 17.

In recent freshman classes, students of color constituted 32–38% of matriculants. International students from over 60 countries make up 8–10% of the student body. In May 2007, Vassar returned to a need-blind admissions policy without regard to a student's financial status.

Vassar president Catharine Bond Hill departed in 2016. She was succeeded by Elizabeth Howe Bradley in 2017.

The college was listed as a census-designated place (Vassar College CDP) in 2019.

=== Presidents ===
The following persons have served as president of Vassar College:

No.	Image	Name	Term start	Term end	Ref.
1		Milo P. Jewett	February 1861	April 1864	
2		John H. Raymond	1864	August 14, 1878 (Note: Died in office.)	
3		Samuel L. Caldwell	September 12, 1878	1885	
acting		J. Ryland Kendrick (Note: Member of the Board of Trustees.)	1885	1886	
4		James Monroe Taylor	1886	1914	
5		Henry Noble MacCracken	1915	June 30, 1946	
6		Sarah Gibson Blanding (Note: First woman president)	July 1, 1946	June 30, 1964	
7		Alan Simpson	July 1, 1964	June 30, 1977	
8		Virginia B. Smith	July 1, 1977	June 30, 1986	
9		Frances D. Fergusson	July 1, 1986	June 30, 2006	
10		Catharine Bond Hill	July 1, 2006	August 15, 2016	
interim		Jonathan Chenette (Note: Dean of the Faculty)	August 16, 2016	June 30, 2017	
11		Elizabeth H. Bradley	July 1, 2017	present	

Table notes:

== Campus ==
The campus is in the Town of Poughkeepsie, adjacent to the City of Poughkeepsie. The area around the campus appeared as a census-designated place (CDP) in the 2020 U.S. census, with a population of 2,472.

=== Architecture ===
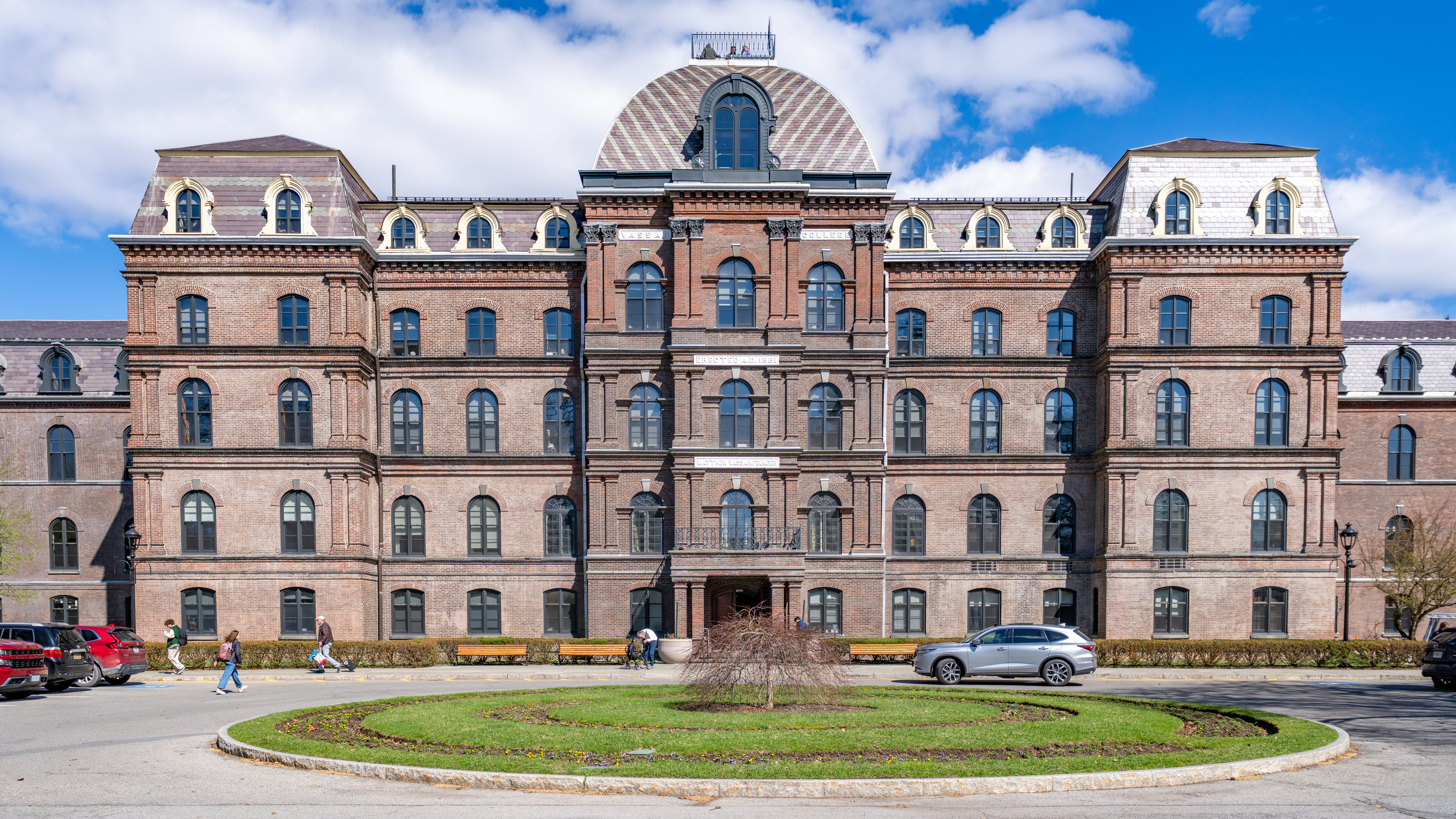
Main Building (2026)

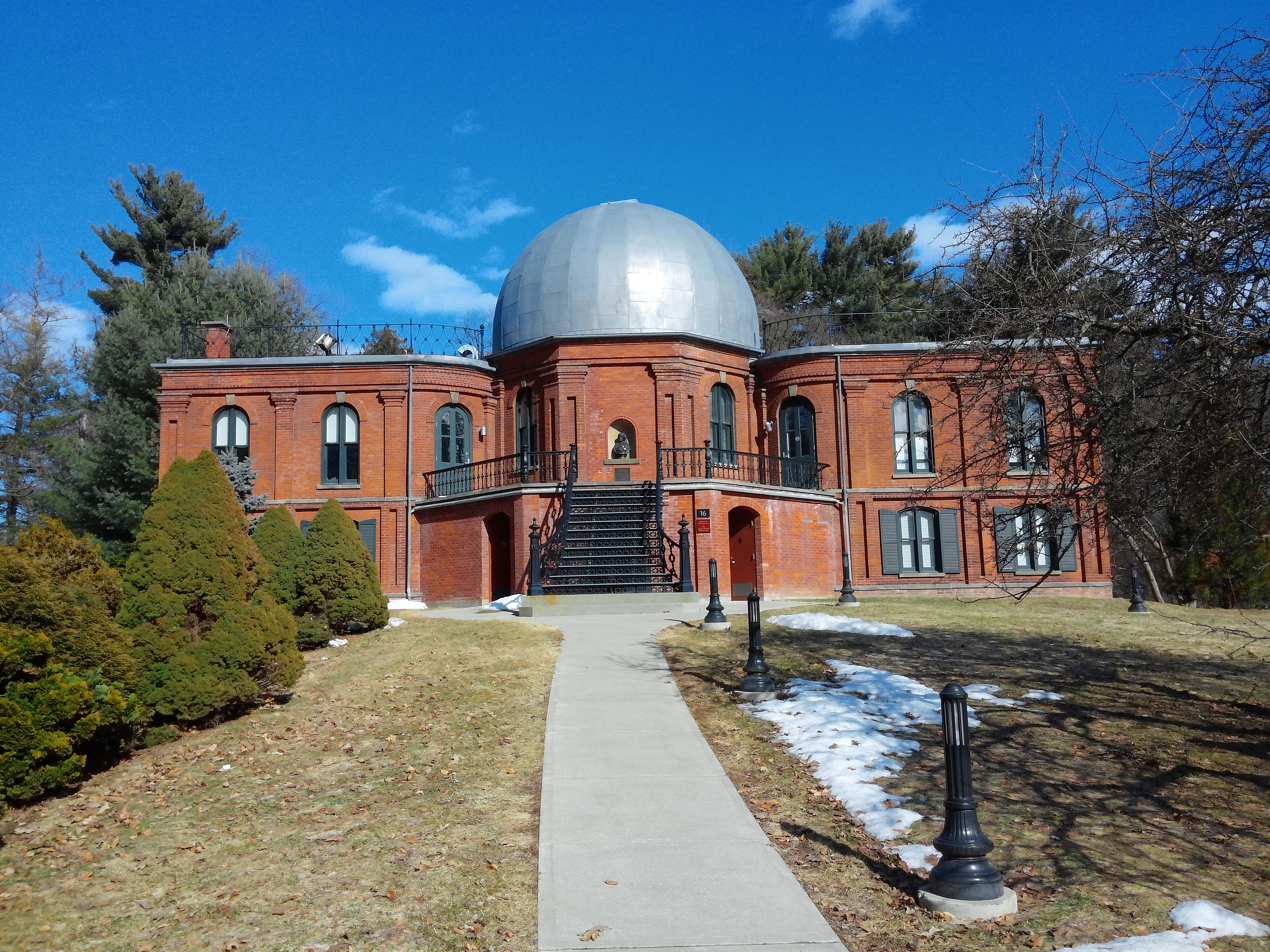
The Vassar College Observatory is one of two National Historic Landmarks on the college's campus, along with the Main Building.

Vassar's campus, also an arboretum, is 1,000 acres (400 ha) and has more than 100 buildings, ranging in style from Collegiate Gothic to International, with several buildings of architectural interest. At the center of campus stands the Main Building, one of the best examples of Second Empire architecture in the United States. When it was opened, the Main Building was the largest building in the U.S. in terms of floor space. It formerly housed the entire college, including classrooms, dormitories, museum, library, and dining halls. The building was designed by Smithsonian architect James Renwick Jr. and was completed in 1865. It was preceded on campus by the original observatory. Both buildings are National Historic Landmarks. Rombout House was purchased by the college in 1915 and added to the National Register of Historic Places in 1982.

Eero Saarinen made designs for several Vassar dormitories, but only one, the Emma Hartman Noyes House, was completed in 1958. Built for roughly 160 students, it was the first part of a circular construction that was to be continued in "Noyes II." The starkly modernist building's high cost and structural difficulties with the windows, however, led administrators to leave it at one. The dorm's common area is famous for its futuristic design; readings and concerts are held there regularly. The Noyes building was also the home of an all-female football team, the Noyes Nymphs, who competed against Ivy League teams in the 1960s and 1970s.

=== Libraries ===
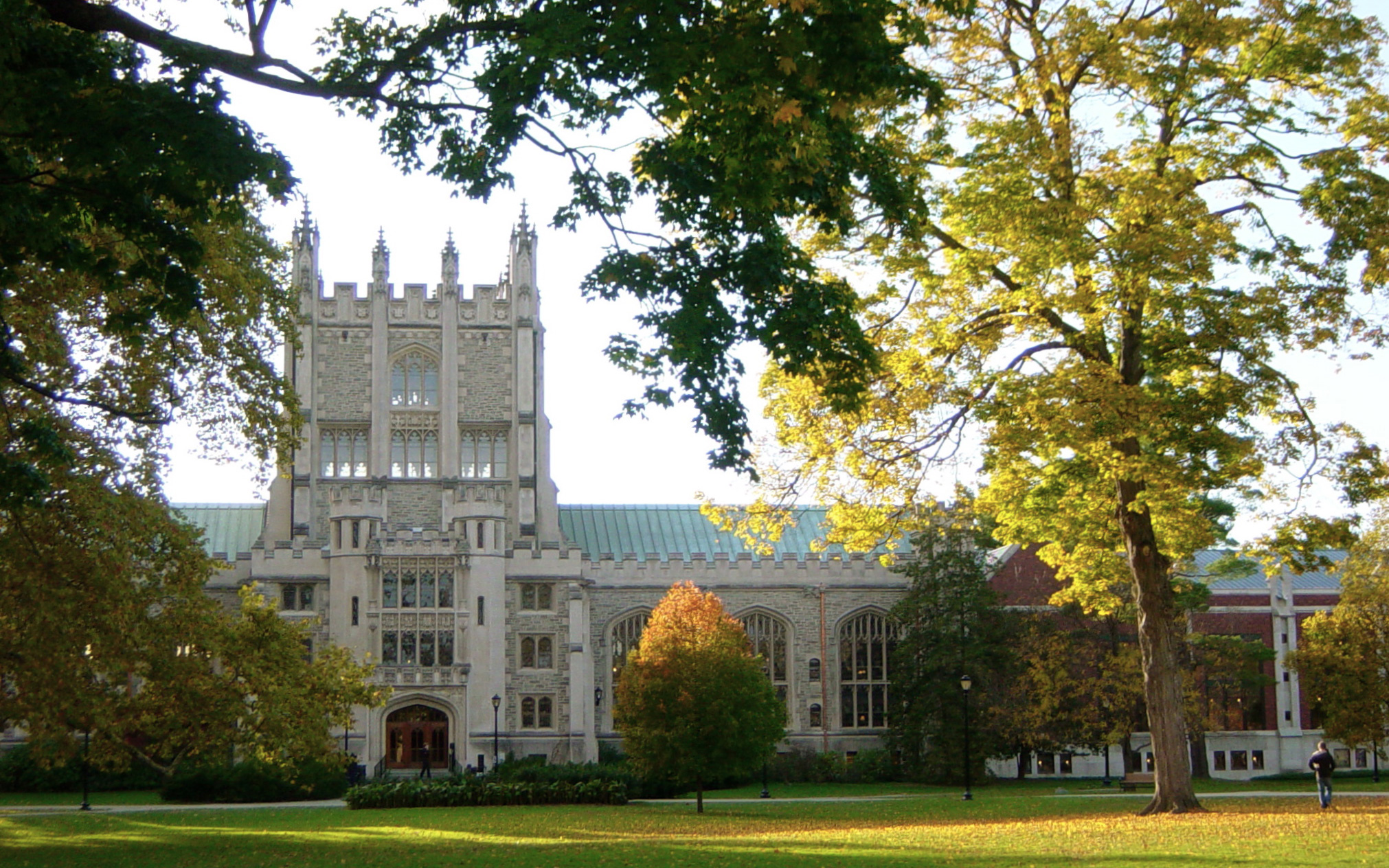
Vassar's Thompson Library

Vassar is home to one of the largest undergraduate library collections in the U.S. The library collection today – which actually encompasses eight libraries at Vassar – contains about 1 million volumes and 7,500 serial, periodical and newspaper titles, as well as an extensive collection of microfilm and microfiche, with special collections of Ellen Swallow Richards, Albert Einstein, Mary McCarthy, and Elizabeth Bishop. Vassar has been a Federal Depository library for selected U.S. Government documents since 1943 and currently receives approximately 25% of the titles available through the Federal Depository Program.

The interior and exterior of the Van Ingen Art Library was renovated from June 2008 – May 2009 in an effort to restore its original design and appearance. This was the library's first major renovation since its construction in 1937.

=== Frances Lehman Loeb Art Center ===
In November 2016, the gallery opened the Hoene Hoy Photography gallery on the second floor, named after Anne Hoene Hoy from the class of 1963.

=== Capital improvements ===
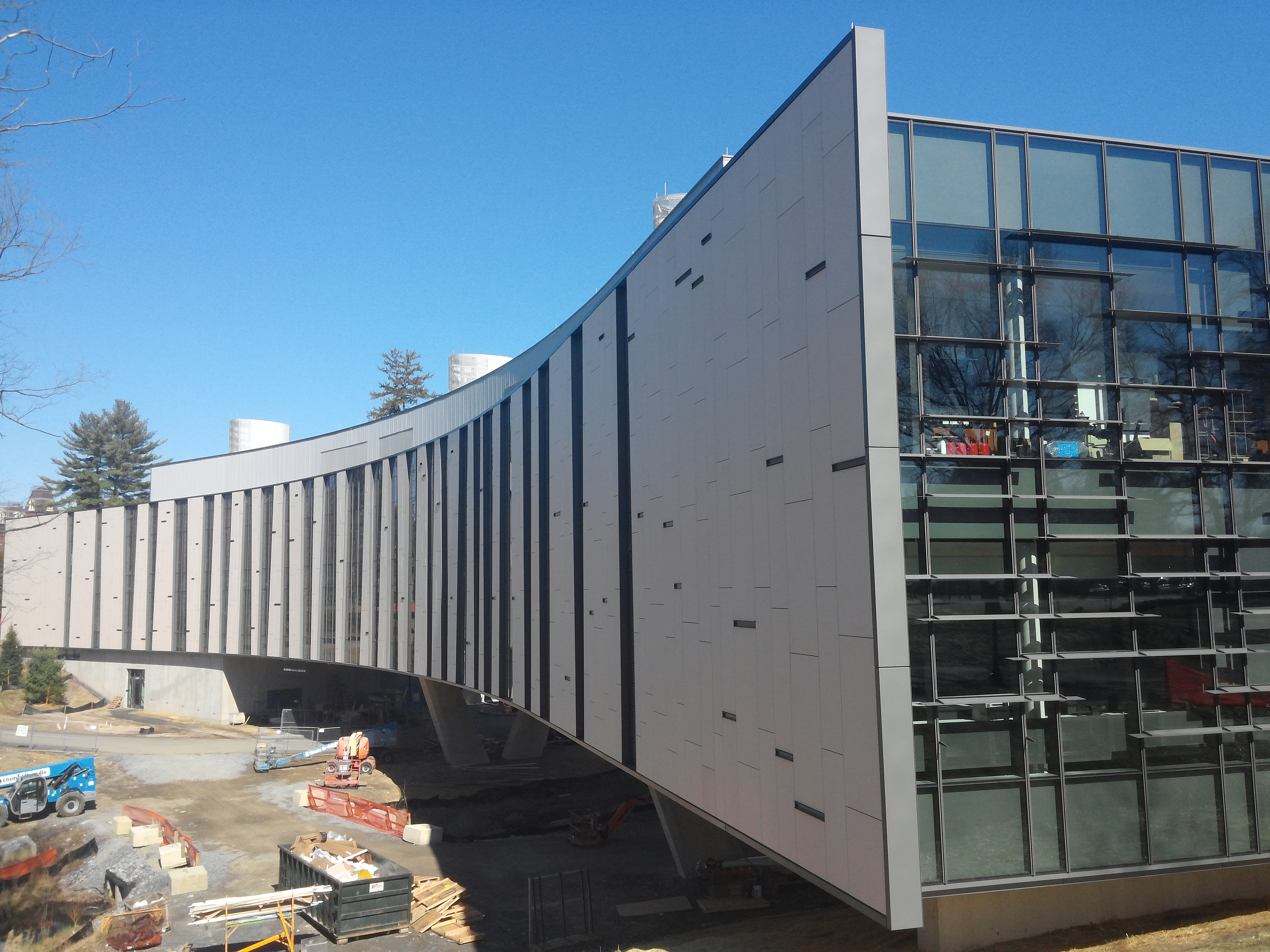
Bridge for Laboratory Sciences exterior west nearing completion, March 2016

In 2011, Vassar embarked on a $120 million project to improve science facilities at the college, centering on the construction of a new Bridge for Laboratory Sciences.

=== Housing ===
The majority of students in their first three years live on campus in the nine residence halls. Main House occupies the upper floors of Main Building, constructed at the college's founding. To accommodate a growing student body, Strong House was constructed in 1893. Strong was made all-women's housing after the college went coeducational in 1969; the house now also accepts nonbinary and other gender-nonconforming students. Similar Elizabethan-style houses—Raymond, Lathrop, and Davison—were built from 1897 to 1902 to form a residential quadrangle. A nine-story Tudor-style dormitory, Jewett House, was constructed in 1907 on the north end of the quadrangle. The second largest dormitory, Josselyn House, was built in 1912 to Jewett's west. Cushing House was constructed outside of the quadrangle in 1927. In a departure from the architecture of the other dormitories, Noyes House was built in 1958 in a distinct modernist style, curved around a large green.

Most fourth-year students live in groups of four or five in on-campus apartments. Vassar has three apartment complexes: the Terrace Apartments, the Town Houses, and the South Commons. A cooperative house, Ferry House, opened in 1951 and houses 20 students. Vassar guarantees housing to all full-time students.

As part of a master plan to renovate all the dormitories, Jewett, Davison, and Josselyn were renovated from 2002 to 2011. The college opted for minor improvements to the rest of the dorms due to cost.

Vassar maintains housing for faculty; the current complex opened in 2023. The previous faculty housing facility, Williams House, was to be demolished after 2020. School-age dependents living on the Vassar faculty complex, as well as other areas in the Vassar College CDP, are within the Arlington Central School District, which operates Arlington High School.

== Academics ==
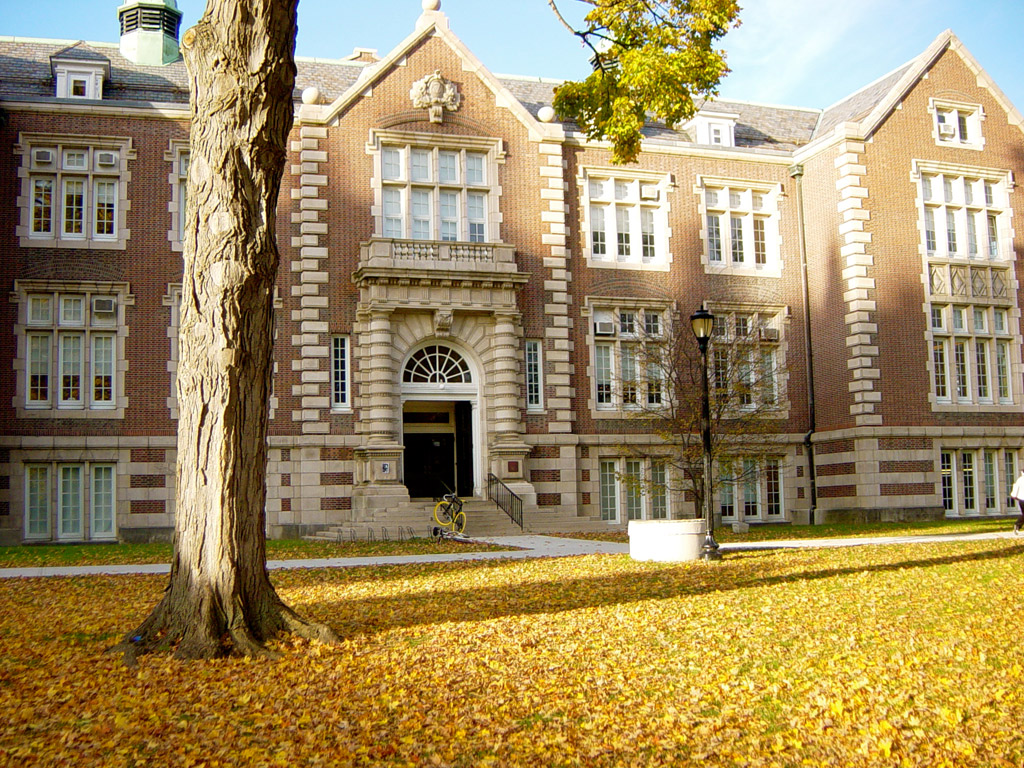
Rockefeller Hall, built in 1897, is home to the departments of Political Science, Philosophy, and Mathematics.

The most popular undergraduate majors, based on 2021 graduates, were:

- Biology/Biological Sciences (40)
- Economics (37)
- Political Science and Government (36)
- English Language and Literature (33)
- Biochemistry (25)
- Neuroscience (25)
- Computer and Information Sciences (23)

=== Admissions ===
Enrolled fall freshman statistics
	2023	2022	2021	2020	2019	2018	2017	2016	
Applicants	12,145	11,412	10,884	8,663	8,961	8,312	7,746	7,284	7,556
Admits	2,153	2,129	2,193	2,126	2,127	2,043	1,842	1,964	1,947
Admit rate	17.7%	18.7%	20.1%	24.5%	23.7 %	24.6%	23.8%	27.0%	25.8%
Enrolled	689	681	679	594	691	685	625	659	667
SAT mid-50% range*	1450–1530	1420–1540	1420–1540		1380–1500	1370–1510	1370–1510	1330–1500	1330–1490
ACT mid-50% range	33–35	32–34	32–34		31–34	31–33	31–33	30–33	30–33
* SAT out of 1600

For the class of 2027 (enrolling fall 2023), Vassar received 12,145 applications and accepted 17.7%. The combined average SAT scores of those who opted to submit their testing data was 1489 and the ACT composite average was 33. The middle 50% ranges for the SAT were 1450-1530 and 33-35 for the ACT. Of the matriculants whose high schools provided rankings, 79% were in the top ten percent of their class. For the class of 2026 (enrolling fall 2022), Vassar received 11,412 applications and accepted 18.7%. For the class of 2025 (enrolling fall 2021), Vassar received 10,884 applications, a 25% increase over the previous year, and accepted 2,068 (19%). For the class of 2023 (enrolling fall 2019), Vassar received 8,961 applications and accepted 2,127 (23.7%), with 691 enrolling. For the class of 2025 (enrolling fall 2021), the middle 50% range of SAT scores for enrolling freshmen was 710-760 for evidence-based reading and writing, 710-780 for math, and 1420-1540 for the composite. The middle 50% ACT score range was 28-33 for math, 32-34 for English, and 32-34 for the composite.

Students of color (including non-citizens) made up 45.5% of the incoming class; international students were 8.8% of enrolling freshmen.

=== Rankings ===
Academic rankings

Liberal arts
- U.S. News & World Report: 12
- Washington Monthly: 11

National
- Forbes: 102
- WSJ/College Pulse: 56

The 2027 edition of U.S. News & World Report's "Best Colleges" ranked Vassar as tied for the 12th best liberal arts college in the U.S. (a list that includes military service academies) out of 211 rated, and 6th for Top Performers On Social Mobility. In previous years the college was ranked in the same list by U.S. News & World Report as high as 10th. Also in the 2027 edition of U.S. News & World Report, Vassar was ranked 9th among private liberal arts colleges in a list that excluded military service academies. In 2024, U.S. News & World Report ranked Vassar second for "Best Colleges for Veterans", 29th for "Best Value", 15th for "Top Performers on Social Mobility", and tied for 20th in "Best Undergraduate Teaching". It also ranked Vassar tied for fourth among top liberal arts colleges for economic diversity as measured by low-income students receiving federal Pell Grants.

In its 2021 edition, Washington Monthly ranked Vassar 11th among 215 liberal arts colleges in the U.S. based on its contribution to the public good, as measured by social mobility, research, and promoting public service.

In its 2020 edition, The Princeton Review rated Vassar first for "Best Financial Aid" of all colleges and universities in the United States. In its 2018 edition, The Princeton Review rated Vassar second best for financial aid and 41st best for "best value". In 2025, Forbes rated Vassar 26th among liberal arts colleges and 102nd overall in its America's Top Colleges ranking, which includes 500 military academies, national universities, and liberal arts colleges. Kiplinger's Personal Finance places Vassar 11th in its 2019 ranking of the 149 best value liberal arts colleges in the United States. Money magazine ranked Vassar 145th in the country out of 739 schools evaluated for its 2020 "Best Colleges for Your Money" edition.

In an article in The Christian Science Monitor, Vassar president emeritus Catharine Bond Hill argued that rankings "will always be limited in what they can tell consumers. Part of higher education's role about the rankings should be to remind students and their families that these are only one piece of information that they should take into account in deciding where to go to college. Intangibles will and should play a role in these decisions, but that doesn't mean we shouldn't also look at the tangibles".

=== Post-graduation outcomes ===
Over half of Vassar graduates pursue advanced study within five years of graduation, including one-fifth immediately post-graduation. Of the seniors who applied to medical school in 2017, 76% were accepted; to law school, 96% were accepted.

== Student life ==
=== Traditions ===
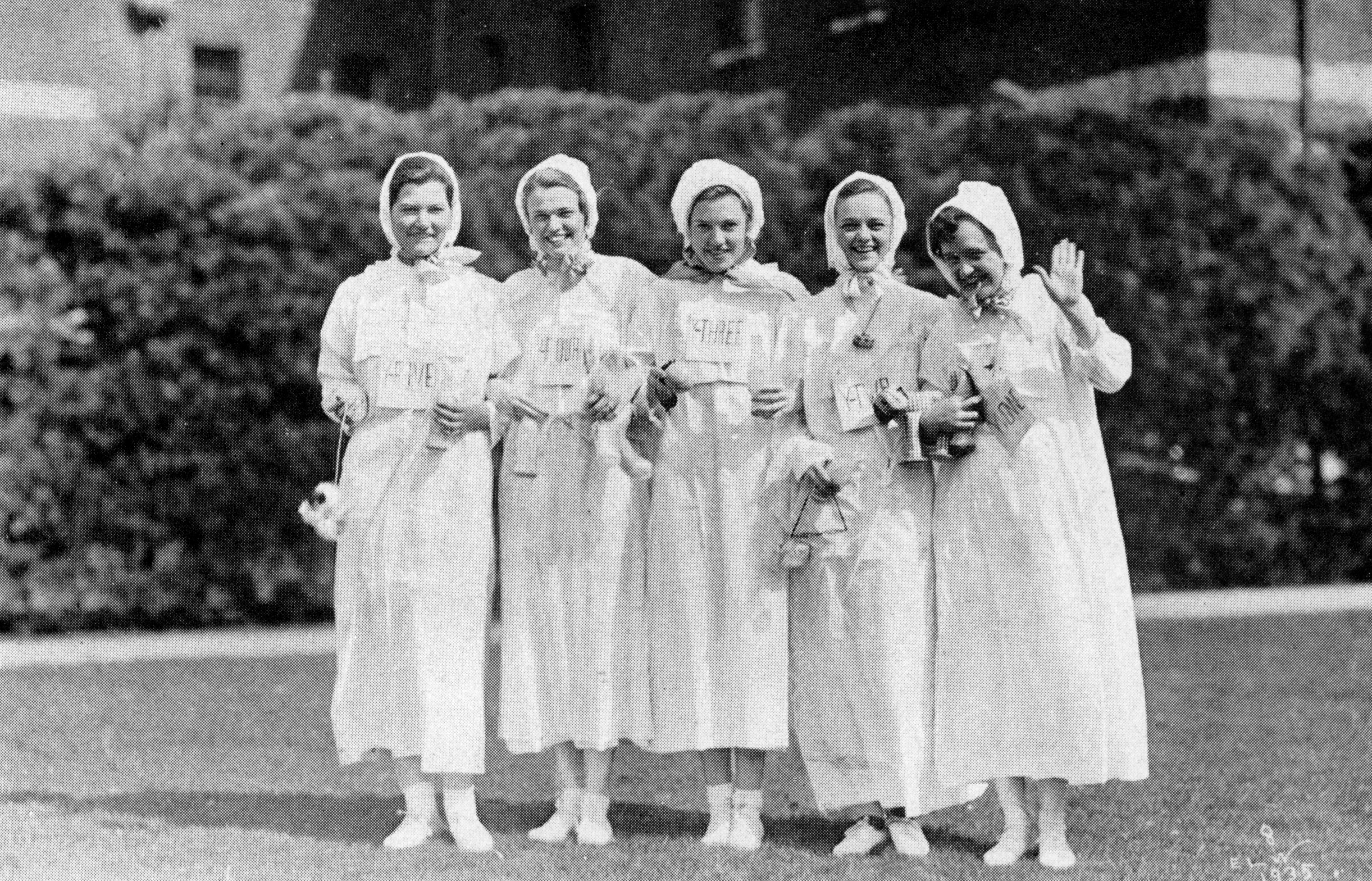
Vassar students celebrating Founder's Day in 1935

Founder's Day is an annual campus festival at Vassar College that usually takes place in late April or early May. It started as a surprise birthday party for college founder Matthew Vassar's seventy-fourth birthday and evolved into an annual celebration. Originally, Founder's Day was a spontaneous event consisting of lectures, but was soon replaced with plays, pageants, and more recreational activities. Circus and fair activities followed, with the eventual addition of the modern day music events over the course of two days. More recently themes have been added, including Alice in Wonderland, Dinosaurs, Vintage 1800s Vassar, Nickelodeon, Nintendo, and Candyland. Recent artists at Founder's Day have included The Walkmen, Edan, DJ /rupture, Odd Nosdam, Jel, Toro y Moi, and Odesza.

=== Extracurricular organizations ===
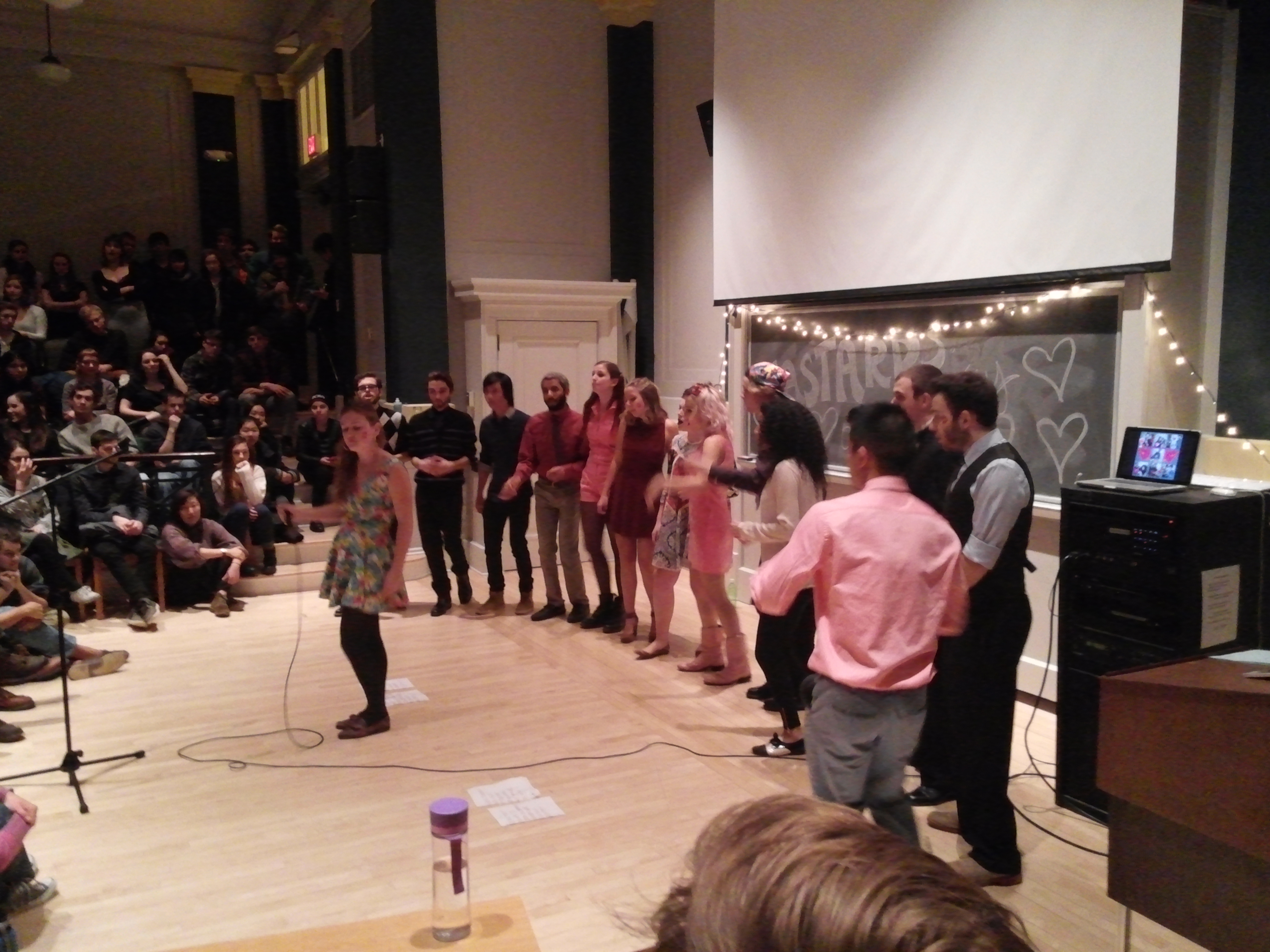
The Vastards performing in 2014

- The Night Owls, established in the 1940s, are, as of 2017, one of the oldest extant collegiate a cappella groups in the United States, and one of nine vocal music groups at Vassar. Other groups include the Vastards (specializing in the music of the 2000s), Broadway and More (BAM; showtunes), the Accidentals (the Axies; the sole all-lower voices a cappella group at Vassar), Beauty and the Beats (focusing on music from Disney movies), Home Brewed (formerly Matthew's Minstrels, the college's first mixed-gender a cappella group), the Vassar Devils, Measure 4 Measure (both themeless groups), and AirCappella (an all-whistling ensemble). Some a cappella groups tour and compete, including the Vassar Devils, who competed in the 2015 International Championship of Collegiate A Cappella.
- The Philaletheis Society, which was founded in 1865 as a literary society, is the oldest theater group on campus. It has now become a completely student run theater group. Others include Unbound (experimental theater), Woodshed (a troupe focused on devised theater), and Idlewild (an ensemble for people of marginalized genders). Britomartis, Vassar's only theater group exclusively creating devised theater, was founded in 2011. Further groups include the Future Waitstaff of America (for musical theater), Ebony Theatre Ensemble (focusing on Black theater), and two Shakespeare-specific troupes, Shakespeare Troupe and Merely Players. The college also hosts the Powerhouse Summer Theater workshop series.
- Happily Ever Laughter ("HEL") is the college's oldest continually active sketch comedy group, founded in 1993. Another comedy group, Big K!dz (formerly No Offense), which was started by two former members of an earlier group called Laughingstock (for which recognition by the student assembly was withdrawn in March 2000, as a result of a controversial sketch), was started in September 2000. Another sketch comedy group, The Limit, was started a few years later. Indecent Exposure, an all-women's troupe performing both sketch and stand-up comedy, was founded in 2004. Comedy Normative, which began in 2009, performs exclusively stand-up comedy. Vassar has a tradition of improv comedy groups, which continue today.
- The Vassar Greens are Vassar's environmental group.
- Vassar College Television (VCTV) is the college's first student-run video production company.

=== Campus publications ===
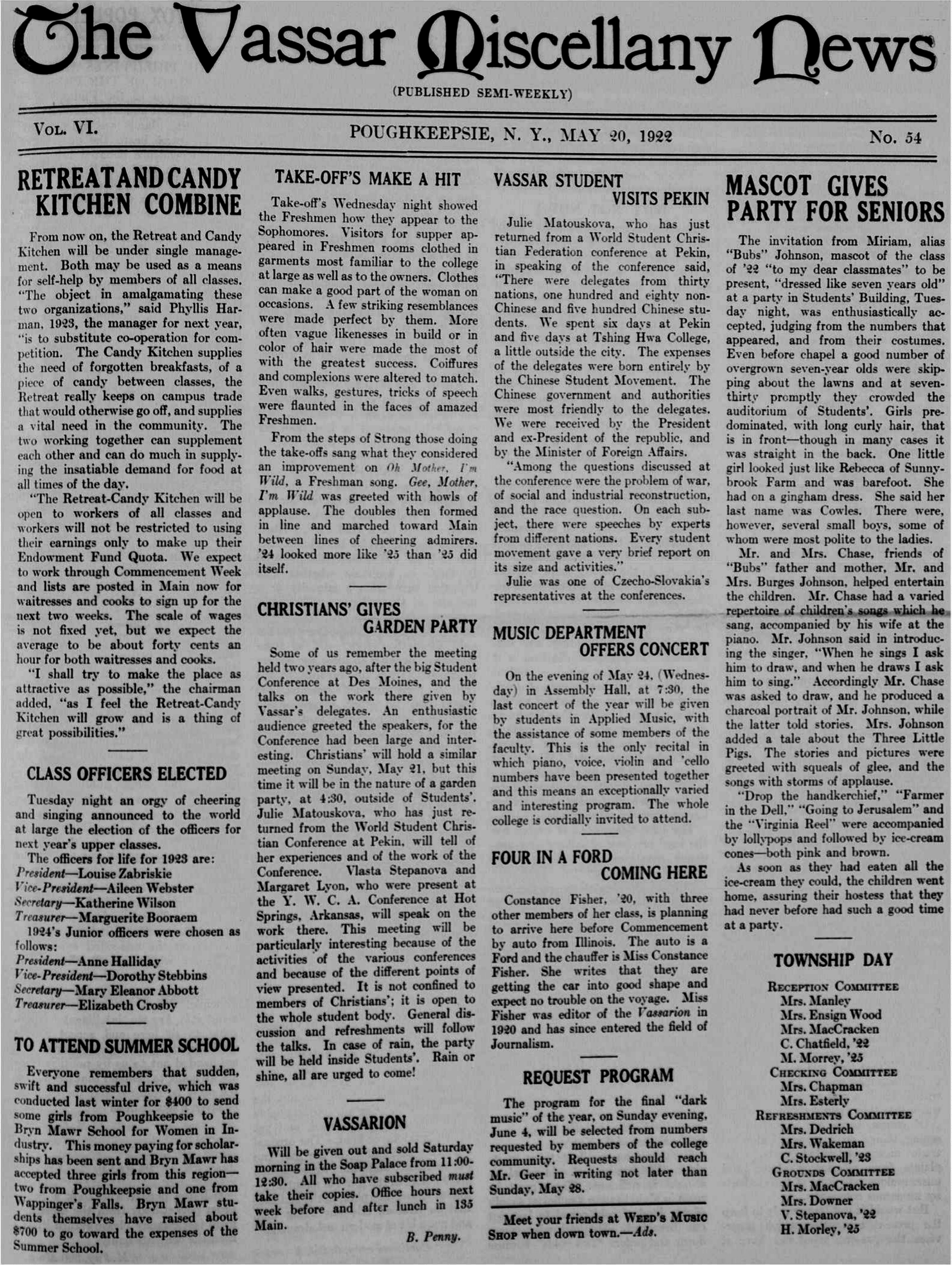
Front page of the May 20, 1922, Miscellany News

- The Miscellany News has been the weekly paper of the college since 1866, making it one of the oldest college weeklies in the United States. It is available for free most Thursdays when school is in session
- Squirm "is a submissions-based magazine about sex and sexuality. Squirm seeks to create a sex-positive forum on campus for the artistic, literary, and creative exploration of sex." The magazine, published annually since 1999, typically runs around 60 pages and is only distributed to the campus community.
- Boilerplate Magazine is a student-run publication that calls itself an "alternative news source... that aims to publish radical pieces and creative works which address issues through a socially conscious lens." Due to its independence from collegiate funds, Boilerplate Magazine is generally more critical of the college than other student-run outlets.
- Unscrewed (October 1, 1976 – April 1, 1989) was a student-run consumer report on campus residential and classroom safety, local food and drug price comparison, an annual local pizza delivery survey, and long-term topics such as the college's endowment and staffing.

=== Radio station ===
WVKR-FM, 91.3 FM, is the college's radio station, established in 1971.

=== Student government ===
In March 2016, in a 15–2 vote, the Vassar Student Association (VSA) passed a resolution calling for the support of the Boycott, Divestment and Sanctions movement and the boycott of Israel. In April 2016, the BDS resolution went to a school-wide referendum, where it was defeated 573–503.

=== Athletics ===
Vassar athletics logo

Vassar teams, known as the Brewers, compete in Division III of the NCAA, as a member of the Liberty League. The nickname originates from the college's founder and namesake Matthew Vassar, whose family ran a brewery in Poughkeepsie and would later amass a sizable fortune in the industry.

In 2008, the Vassar men's volleyball team made the school's first appearance in a national championship game, beating UC Santa Cruz 3–0 in the semifinal before falling to Springfield in the championship game.

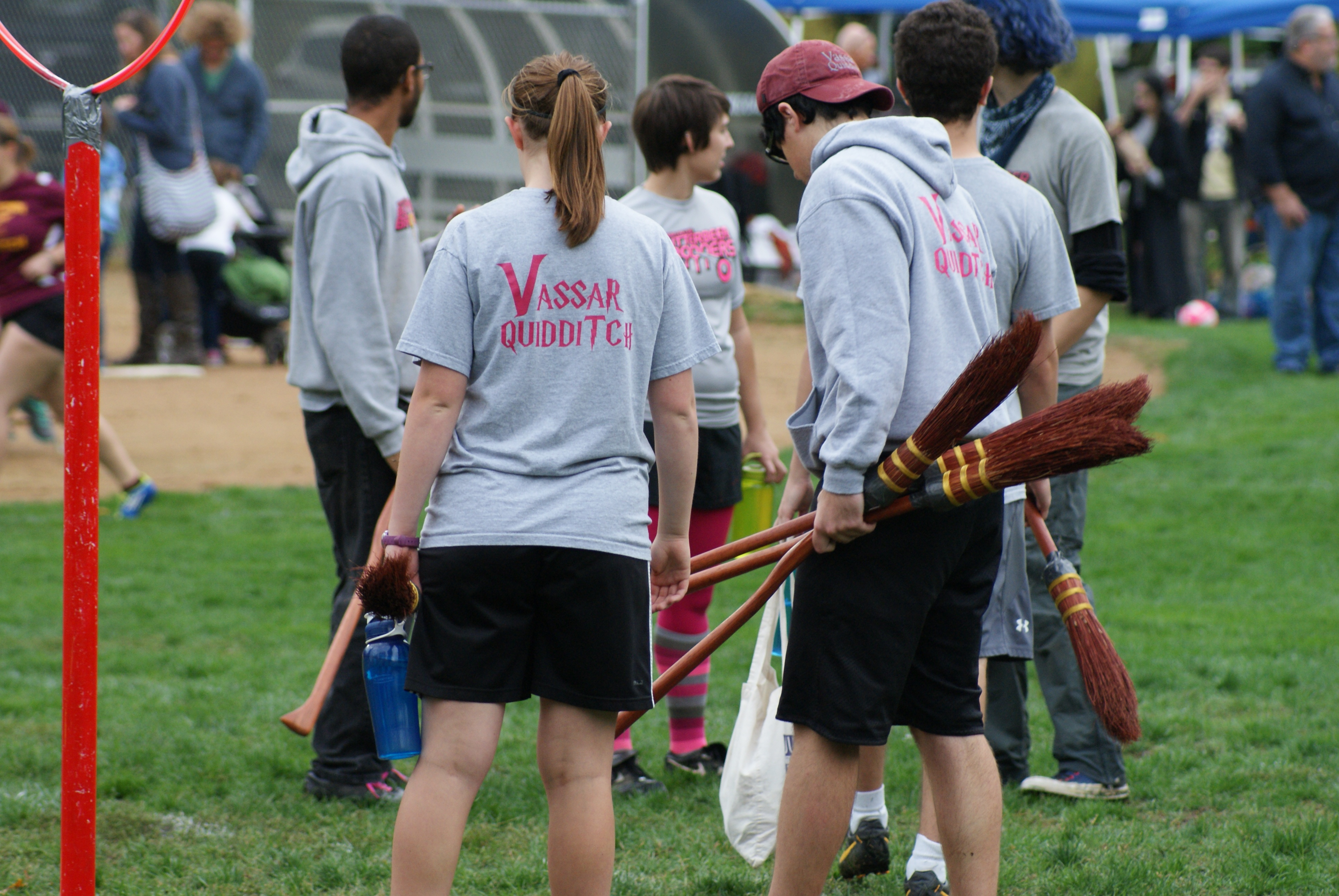
The Butterbeer Broooers, Vassar's Muggle Quidditch team

In 2007, the Vassar cycling team hosted the Eastern Collegiate Cycling Championship in Poughkeepsie and New Paltz, New York. The competition included a 100-mile (160 km) road race over the Shawangunk Mountains in New Paltz as well as a criterium in Poughkeepsie just blocks from the school's campus.

In a controversial move, on November 5, 2009, the athletics department leaders decided the men's and women's rowing team would transition over a two-year period from a varsity to a club sport as a cost-saving measure.

In 1940, 1941 and 1942, Vassar athletes won national intercollegiate women's tennis championships each year in both singles (Katharine Hubbell) and doubles (Hubbell, Carolyn "Lonny" Myers).

In 2018, the Vassar women's rugby team won the school's first team national championship, beating Winona State 50–13 in the final of the USA Rugby Women's Division 2.

== Notable people ==
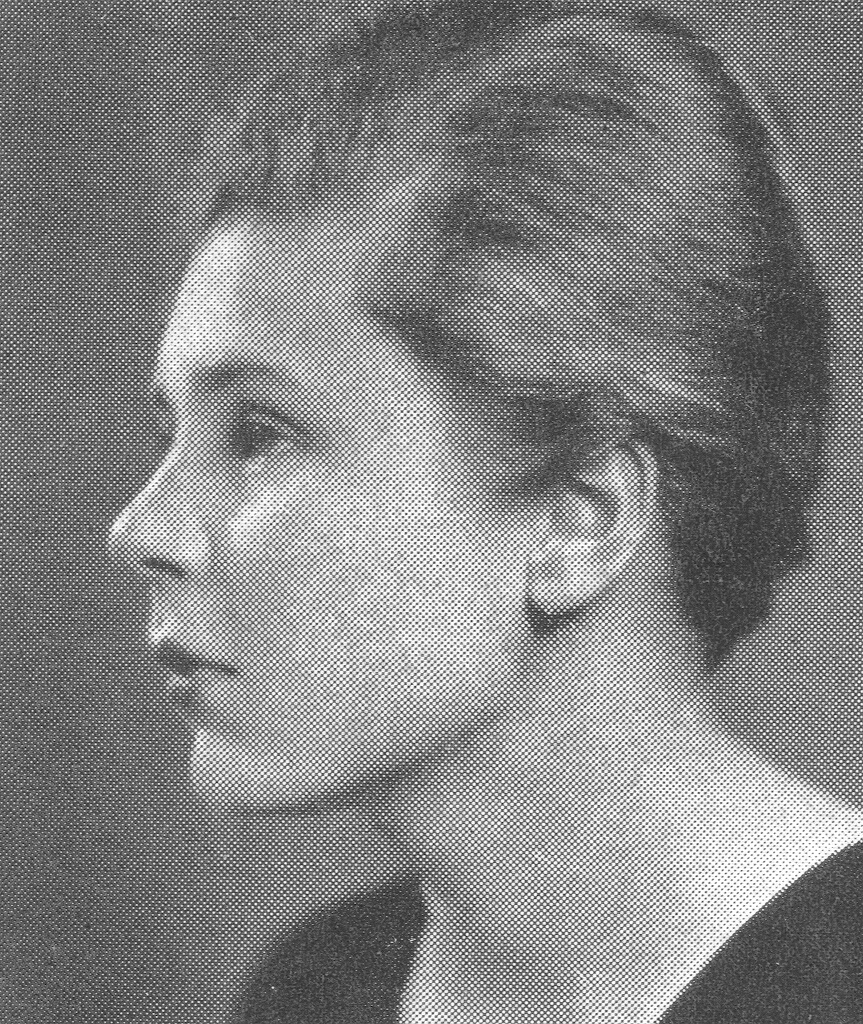
Elizabeth Bishop, Pulitzer Prize-winning poet

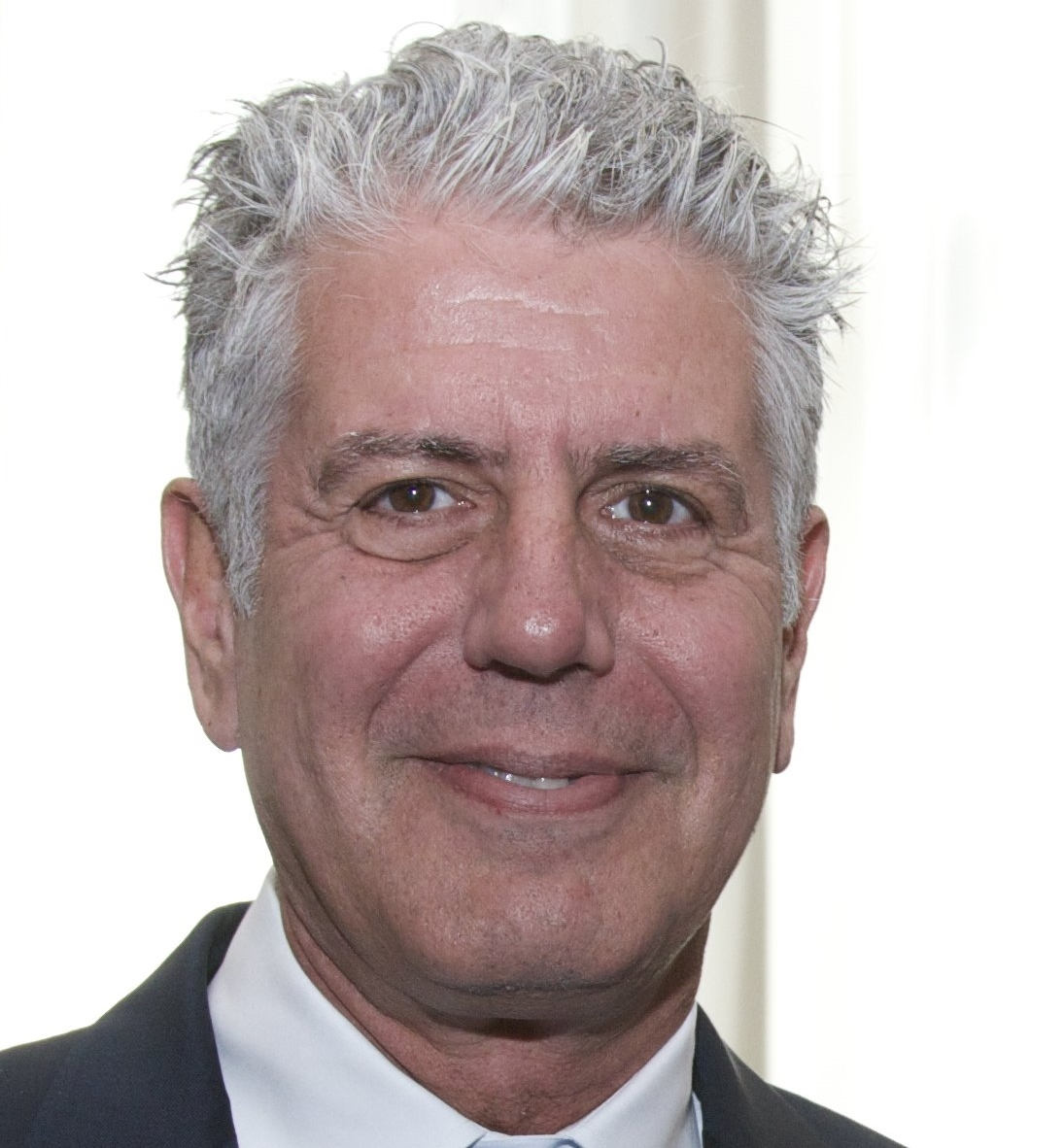
Anthony Bourdain, Emmy Award-winning author and celebrity chef

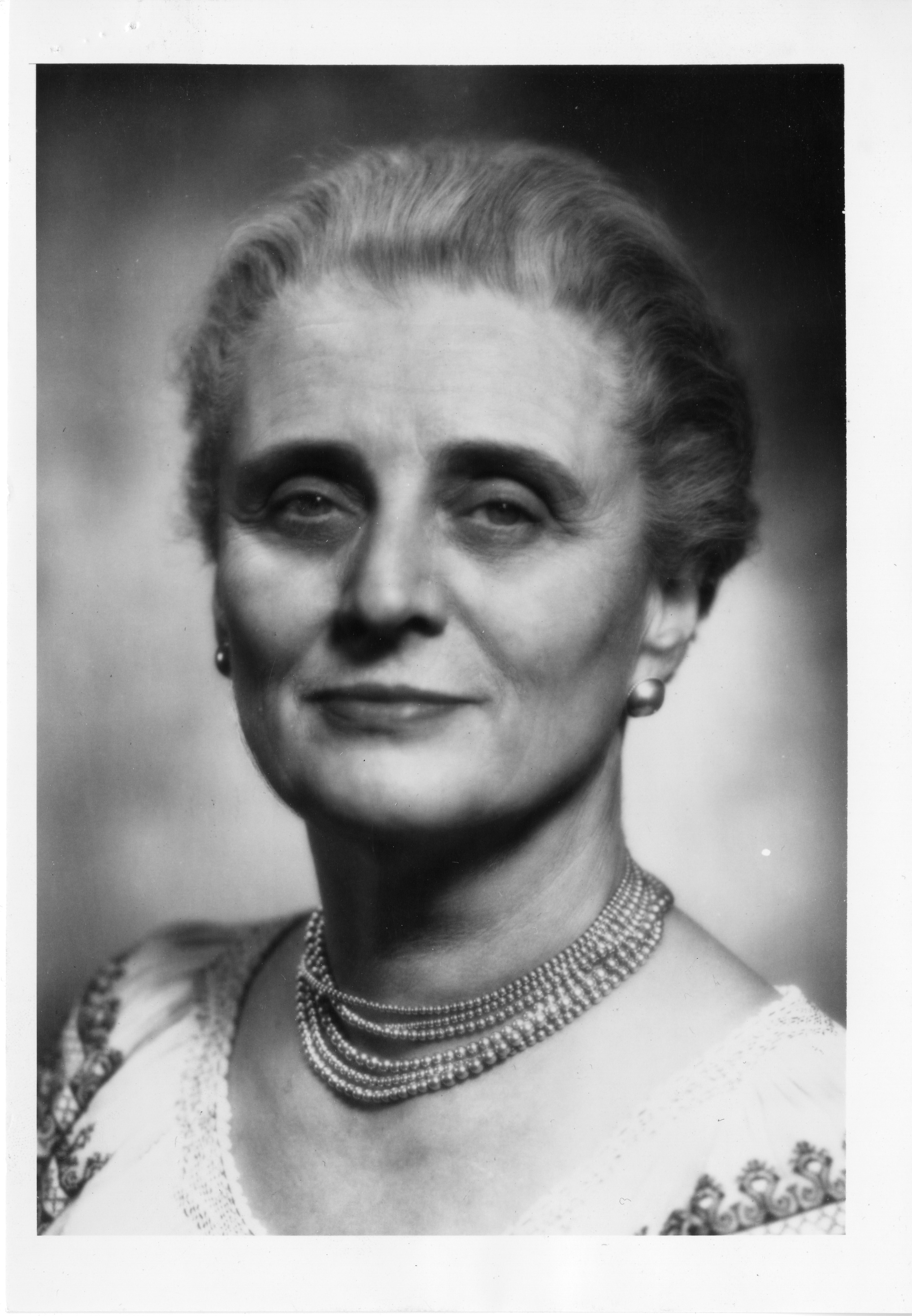
Mary Calderone, public health advocate and "mother of sex education"

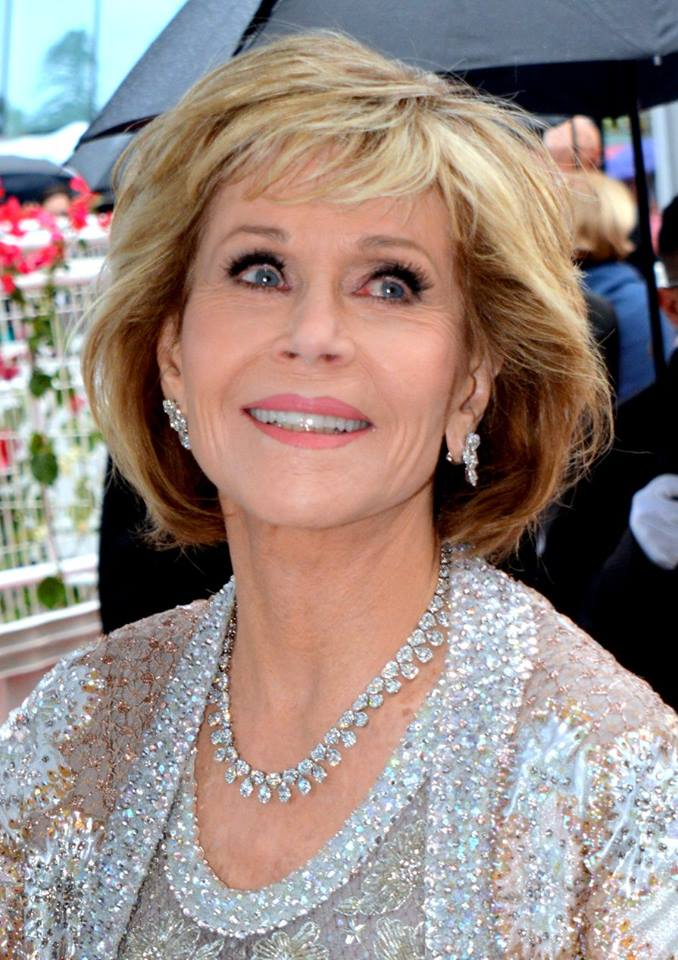
Jane Fonda, Academy Award-winning actress

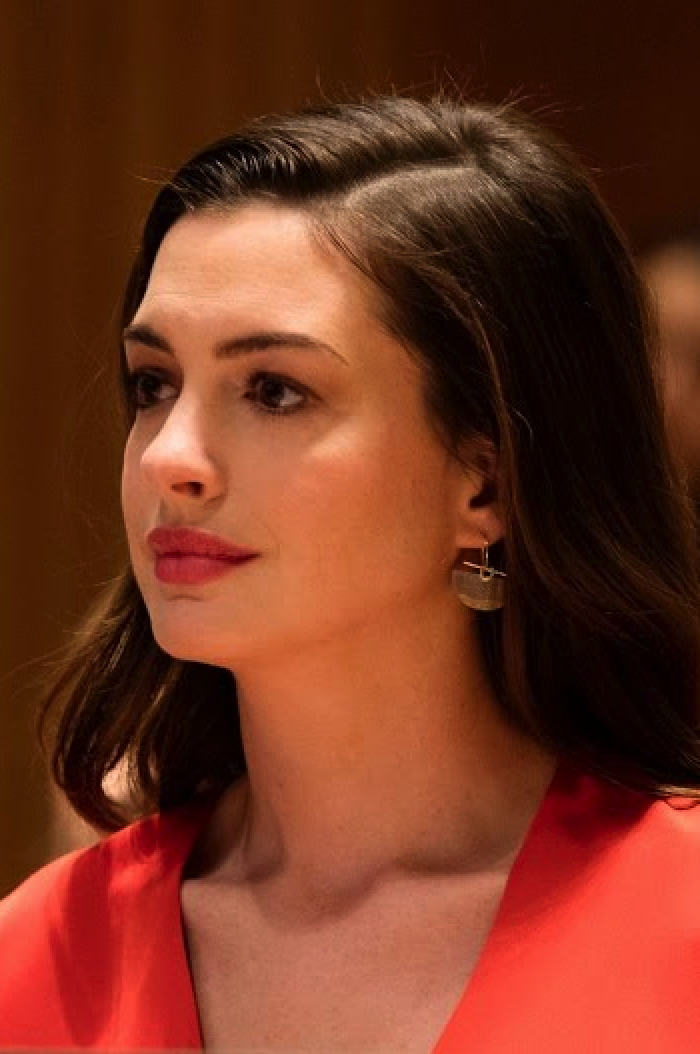
Anne Hathaway, Academy Award-winning actress

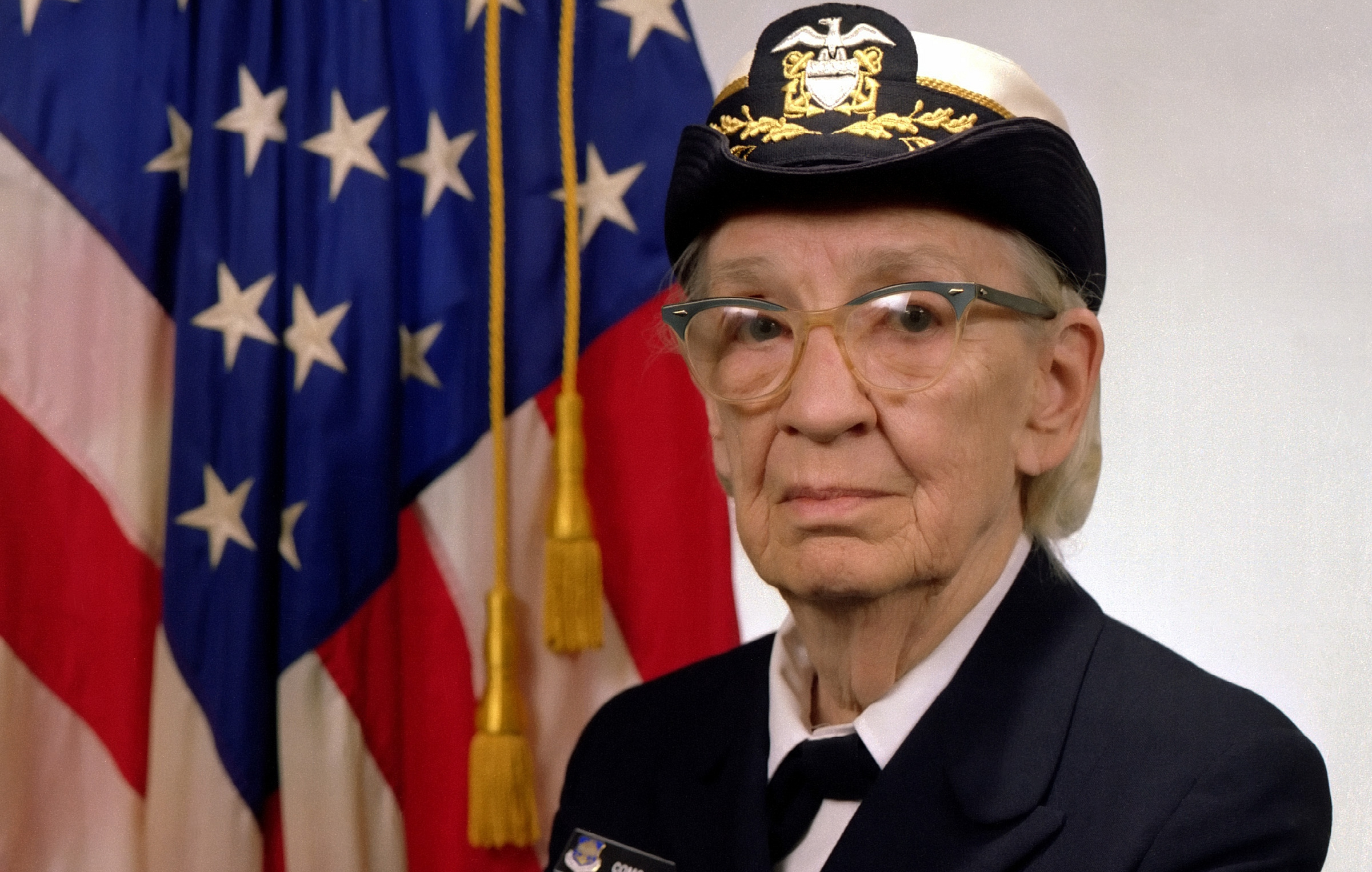
Grace Hopper, inventor of the first compiler for a computer programming language

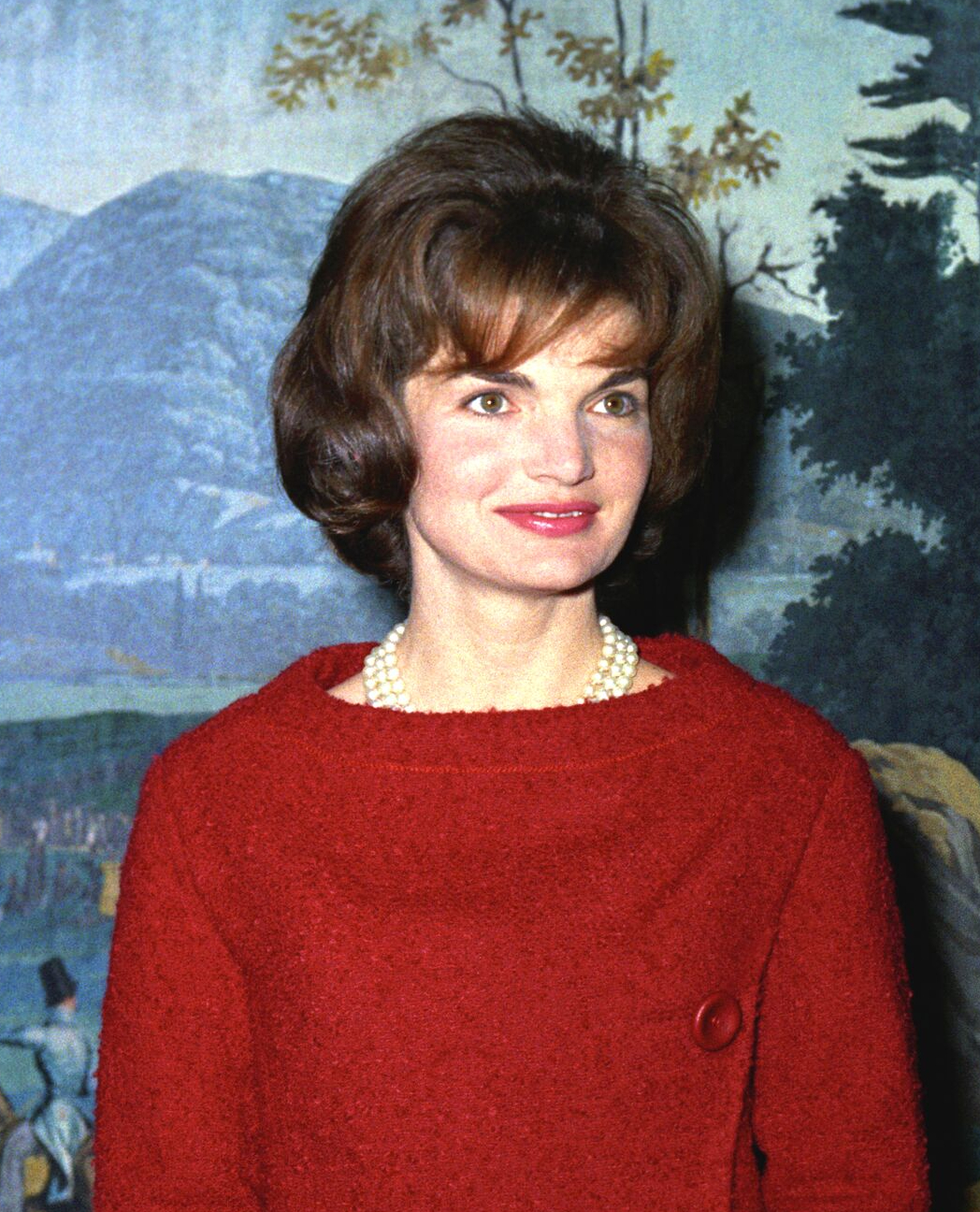
Jacqueline Kennedy Onassis, former First Lady of the United States (transferred to George Washington University)

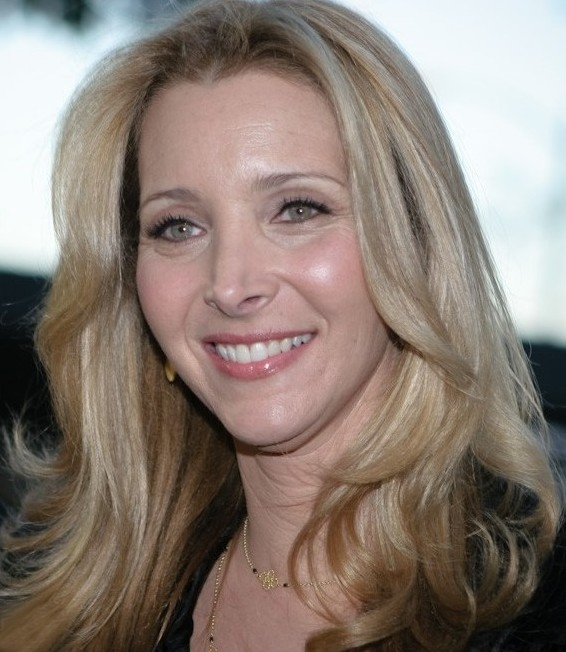
Lisa Kudrow, Emmy Award-winning actress

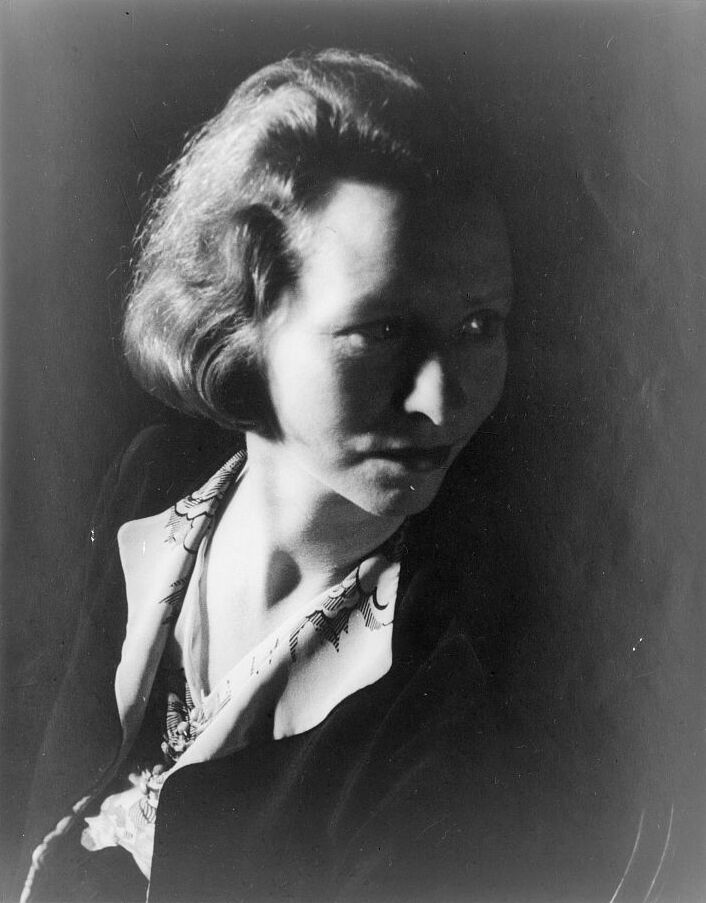
Edna St. Vincent Millay, Pulitzer Prize-winning lyrical poet

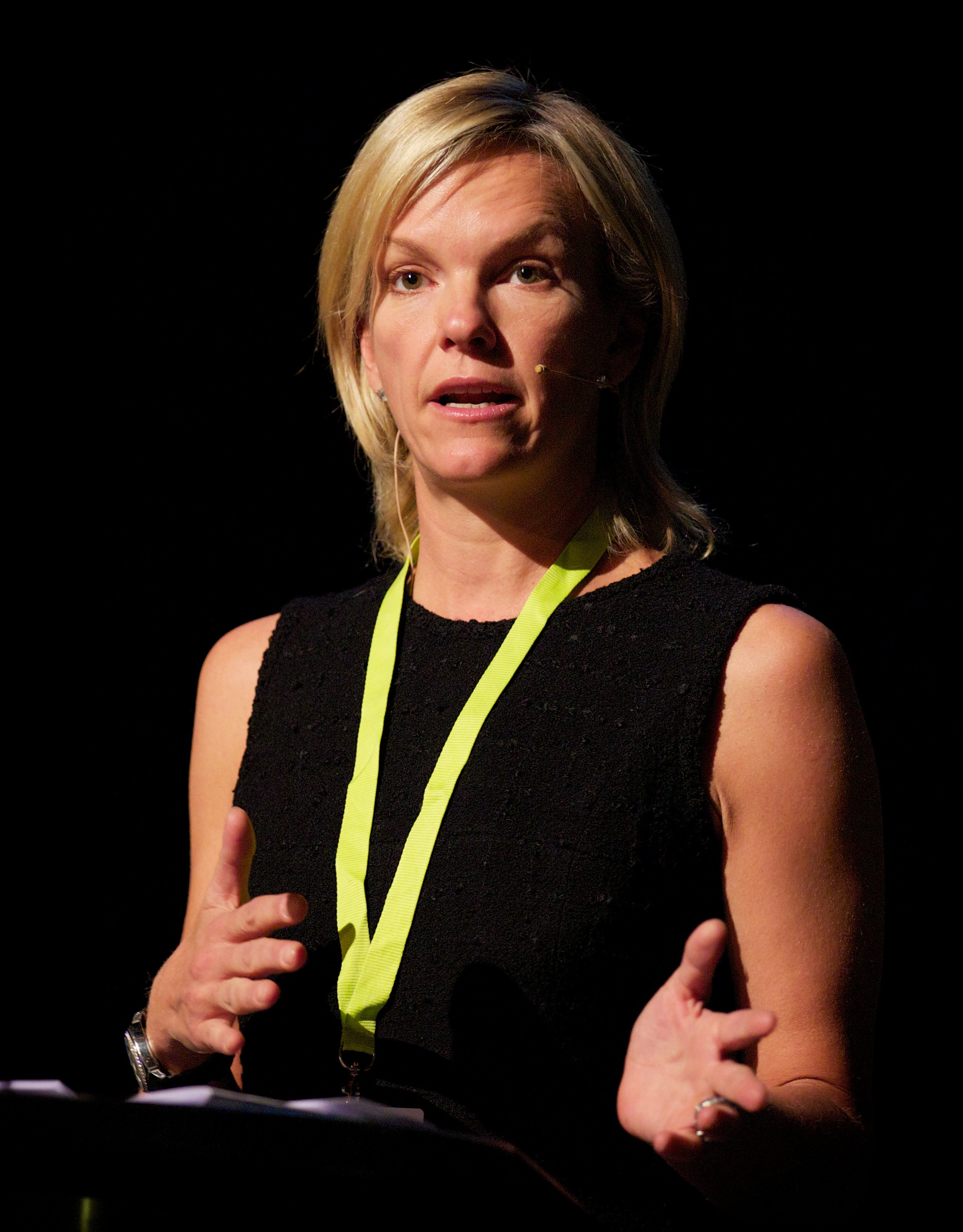
Elisabeth Murdoch, media executive

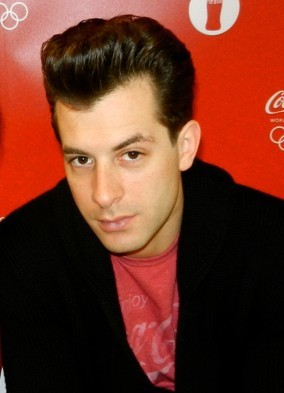
Mark Ronson, Grammy Award-winning musician and producer

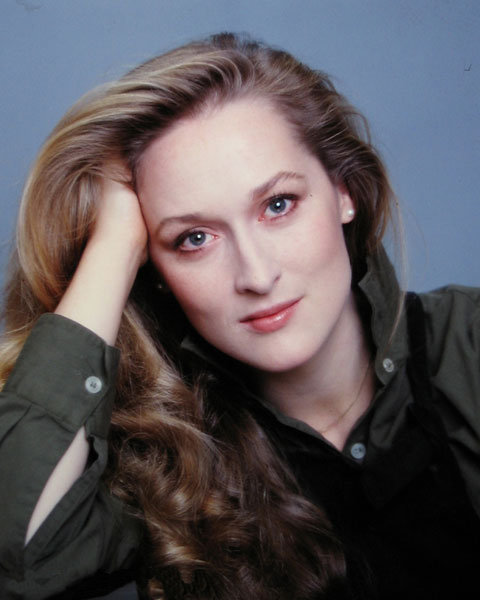
Meryl Streep, Academy Award-winning actress

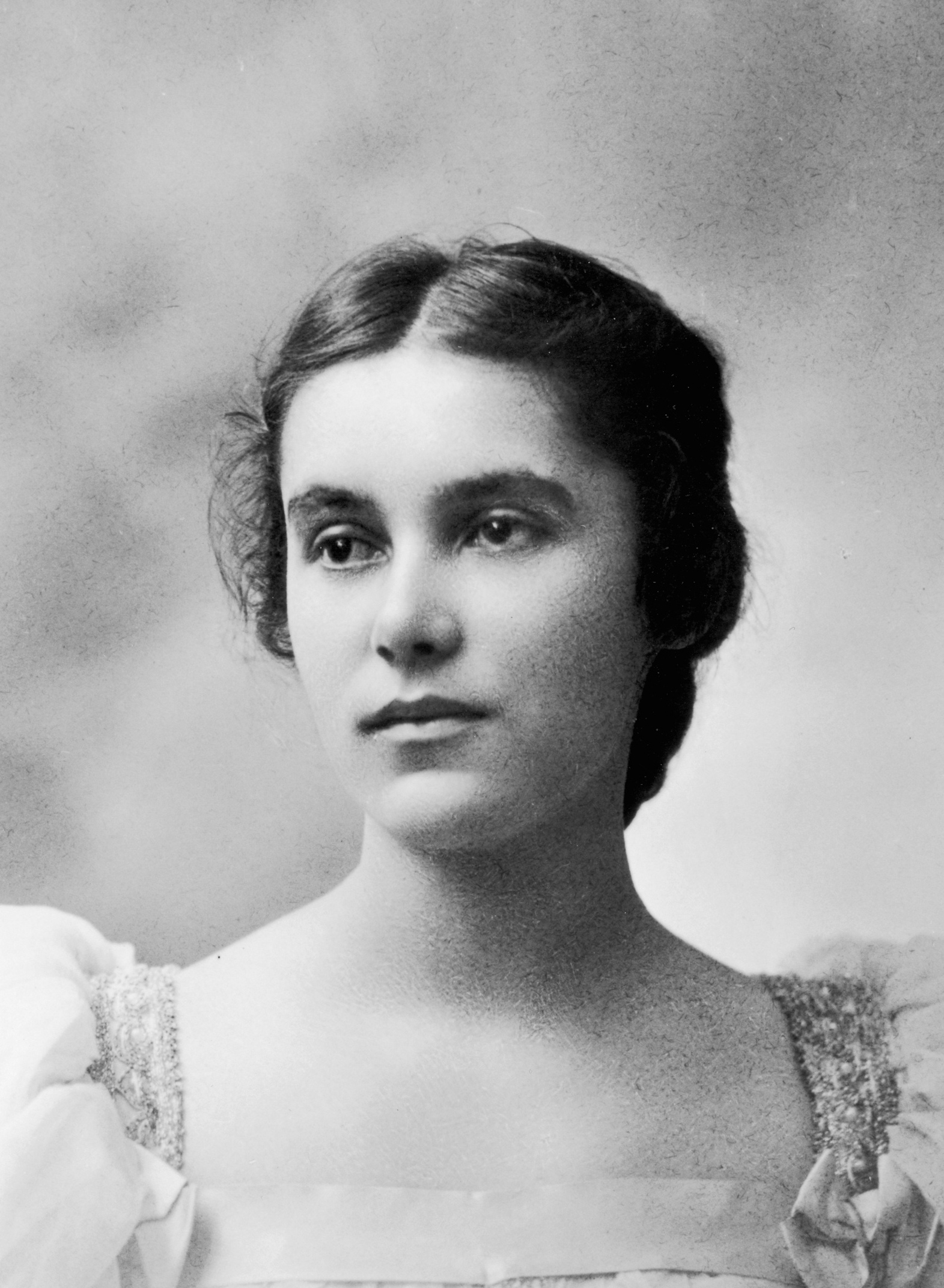
Anita Florence Hemmings, first graduate of Vassar with African ancestry

Notable Vassar alumni include:

- Harriot Stanton Blatch (1878), writer and suffragist
- Elizabeth Hazleton Haight (1894), feminist and Classics scholar
- Anita Florence Hemmings (1897), first graduate of African ancestry
- Frances Dorrance (1900), founded the Society for Pennsylvania Archaeology
- Lucy Burns (1902), suffragist and leader of the National Woman's Party
- Crystal Eastman (1903), lawyer, journalist, suffragist, member of the National Woman's Party, co-author of the Equal Rights Amendment (ERA), and founder of the American Civil Liberties Union (ACLU)
- Edith Clarke (1908), first female electrical engineer
- Inez Milholland (1909), labor attorney, suffragist, public speaker, and member of the National Woman's Party
- Ruth Starr Rose (1910), artist
- Edna St. Vincent Millay (1917), poet
- Mary Calderone (1925), physician, public health advocate and "mother of sex education"
- Grace Hopper (1928), computer pioneer
- Mary McCarthy (1933), critic and novelist
- Elizabeth Bishop (1934), poet
- Ann Cole Gannett (1937), politician
- Carol F. Jopling (1938), anthropologist, and chief librarian of the Smithsonian Tropical Research Institute
- Frances Scott Fitzgerald (1942), journalist
- Beatrix Hamburg (1944), physician
- Virginia Seay (1944), composer and musicologist
- Frances Farenthold (1946), politician and activist
- Vera Rubin (1948), astrophysicist
- Linda Nochlin (1951), art historian
- Lois Haibt (1955), member of FORTRAN development team
- Sandra McGrath, American-born Australian art writer, historian, collector, and critic
- Jane Reisman (1959), Broadway lighting designer
- Nina Zagat (1963), Zagat Survey co-founder
- Bernadine P. Healy (1965), physician and National Institutes of Health director
- Lucinda Cisler (1965), feminist and abortion-rights activist
- Geraldine Laybourne (1969), Nickelodeon president and Oxygen Media founder and CEO
- Linda Fairstein (1969), writer and prosecutor
- Rebecca Eaton (1969), Emmy Award-winning executive producer of Masterpiece on PBS
- Meryl Streep (1971), three-time Academy Award-winning actress
- Jane Smiley (1971), Pulitzer Prize-winning fiction writer
- Paula Williams Madison (1974), NBCUniversal executive and author
- Michael Wolff (1975), journalist
- Richard L. Huganir (1975), neuroscientist and director of the Johns Hopkins Medicine Brain Science Institute
- Chip Reid (1977), CBS News chief and White House correspondent
- Jeffrey Goldstein (1977), former World Bank CFO and undersecretary of the Treasury for Domestic Finance
- Michael Specter (1977), The New Yorker magazine science writer
- Jamshed Bharucha (1978), Cooper Union president
- Phil Griffin (1979), MSNBC president
- John Carlstrom (1981), astrophysicist and MacArthur Award fellow
- Pamela Mars-Wright (1982), former board chairman of Mars Inc.
- Cheryl Kagan (1983), politician
- Philip Jefferson (1983), economist and Federal Reserve Board vice chair
- Mark Burstein (1984), president of Lawrence University of Wisconsin
- Ada Ferrer (1984), Pulitzer Prize-winning historian
- Sherrilyn Ifill (1984), seventh president and director-counsel of the NAACP Legal Defense and Educational Fund
- Andrew Zimmern (1984), food writer, dining critic, radio talk show host, TV personality and chef
- Lisa Kudrow (1985), actress
- Hope Davis (1986), actress
- Evan Wright (1988), journalist
- Jonathan Karl (1990), ABC News chief White House correspondent
- Jeffrey Brenner (1990), physician and MacArthur Award fellow
- John Gatins (1990), Academy Award-nominated screenwriter
- Liz Cole (1990), NBC television producer and television executive
- Noah Baumbach (1991), writer and director
- Jason Blum (1991), Emmy Award-winning and Academy Award-nominated film and television producer
- Caterina Fake (1991), Flickr founder
- Elisabeth Murdoch (1992), Shine Limited CEO and chairman
- Jon Fisher (1994), writer
- Katherine Center (1994), novelist
- Joe Hill (1995), novelist
- Lecy Goranson (1995), actress
- Jessi Klein (1997), Emmy Award-winning comedy writer-producer
- Jesse Ball (2000), writer
- Alexandra Berzon (2001), Pulitzer Prize-winning journalist and The Wall Street Journal reporter
- Shaka King (2001), Academy Award-nominated film director, screenwriter, and producer
- Jason Blakely (2003), political philosopher
- Victoria Legrand (2003), musician and songwriter
- Greg Russo (2003), screenwriter of Mortal Kombat
- Jonás Cuarón (2005), screenwriter and director
- Sasha Velour (2009), winner of RuPaul's Drag Race Season 9
- Lilli Cooper (2012), Tony Award-nominated actress
- Natasha Bertrand (2014), journalist and correspondent for CNN
- Ethan Slater (2014), Tony Award-nominated actor
- Raph Korine (2017), runner-up of Big Brother 18 (UK)
- Olivia Newman, film director and screenwriter

Notable attendees who did not graduate from Vassar include:

- Susan Berresford, president of the Ford Foundation
- Anthony Bourdain, professional chef and television personality
- Mike D, member of the Beastie Boys
- Jane Fonda, actress
- Katharine Graham, The Washington Post publisher
- Anne Hathaway, actress
- Brooke Hayward, actress, author, art collector
- Jacqueline Kennedy Onassis, First Lady of the United States, book editor
- Justin Long, actor
- Mark Ronson, Academy Award-winning musician
- Curtis Sittenfeld, writer
- Julia Tutwiler, education and prison reform advocate
- Rachael Yamagata, musician

Notable Vassar faculty include:

- Frank Bergon, writer
- Grace Hopper, computer scientist
- Hua Hsu, writer
- Michael Joyce, writer and pioneer of hypertext fiction
- Grace Macurdy, classicist
- James Merrell, historian
- Mitchell Miller, philosopher
- Maria Mitchell, pioneering female astronomer
- Uma Narayan, philosopher
- Mabel Newcomer, economist
- Paul Russell, writer
- Peter Stillman, political scientist
- Bryan W. Van Norden, philosopher
- Nancy Willard, writer
- Richard Edward Wilson, composer
- Monique Wittig, philosopher

== See also ==
- List of coordinate colleges
