= Carol F. Jopling =

American anthropologist and librarian

- Born: November 3, 1916
- Died: October 13, 2000; Bethesda
- Education: Vassar College, Catholic University of America, University of Massachusetts
- Occupations: Anthropologist, librarian, historian
- Employers: Smithsonian Institution (1961–1962); Smithsonian Tropical Research Institute (1981–1984)

Carol Farrington Jopling (November 3, 1916 – October 14, 2000) was an anthropologist, librarian, and chief librarian of the Smithsonian Tropical Research Institute between 1981 and 1984.

== Personal life ==
Carol F. Jopling was born on November 3, 1916 in Louisville to Elizabeth Farrington and her husband. She had one brother, Robert K. Farrington. She married aeronautical engineer Peter White Jopling in 1940. They had three children: Morgan W. Jopling, John P. Jopling, and Hannah Jopling. Carol and Peter Jopling would later divorce. Carol F. Jopling died on 13 October 2000 in Bethesda.

== Education ==
Jopling graduated from Vassar College in 1938 with a bachelor's degree in Art history. She earned both of her master's degrees from Catholic University of America one in library science in 1960 and the second in anthropology in 1963.

Jopling conducted anthropological fieldwork among the Zapotec people in Yalalag, Oaxaca, Mexico, between 1969 and 1971 as a part of her doctorate from the University of Massachusetts in anthropology, which she received In 1973,. Her dissertation is titled "Women Weavers of Yalalag; Their Art and Its Process."

== Career ==
From 1960 to 1961, Jopling worked as a librarian at the University of Maryland. Jopling worked for several federal entities throughout the 1960s. She worked for the Library Congress (1961), Smithsonian Institution Bureau of American Ethnology (1961–1962), the United States Information Agency (1962–1963), and the Central Intelligence Agency (1963–1967). She was a social science bibliographer at University of Massachusetts Amherst.

From 1973 to 1976, Jopling worked at the Smithsonian Institution as librarian of the National Museum of Natural History and was later affiliated with the National Anthropological Archives. Her work contributed to the cataloguing and preservation of visual anthropological records, including photographs and field documentation.

She edited the anthology Art and Aesthetics in Primitive Societies (1971), which brought together foundational texts on cross-cultural aesthetic theory and visual analysis. Later, her book Puerto Rican Houses in Sociohistorical Perspective (1988) examined vernacular architecture through a sociohistorical lens and received the Allen Noble Book Award from the Pioneer America Society in 1989.

She also taught art and anthropology from 1967 to 1975 at American University, Catholic University of America, North Adams State College, Harvard University, University of Massachusetts Amherst, and Tufts University. From 1975 to 1979, Jopling was a research associate at Peabody Museum of Archaeology and Ethnology.

In 1981, Jopling became the chief librarian of the Smithsonian's Tropical Research Institute located in Panama. She retired in 1984.

Then in 2003, Jopling also co-edited and annotated the historical travel journal Journal of a Voyage Around the World: A Year on the Ship Helena (1842–1842), originally written by her great-grandfather, contributing to maritime history and archival documentation.

Her research materials, photographs, and field notes are preserved in the Smithsonian Institution's National Anthropological Archives.

== Awards and honors ==
Carol F. Jopling's book Puerto Rican Houses in Sociohistorical Perspective (1988) won the 1989 Allen Noble Book award for best edited book from the International Society for Landscape, Place, & Material Culture.
