= Elizabeth H. Bradley =

President of Vassar College since 2017

Elizabeth Bradley

11th President of Vassar College
- Incumbent
- Assumed office July 1, 2017
- Preceded by: Catharine Hill

Personal details
- Born: Elizabeth Howe Bradley; 1962 (age 63–64)
- Education: Harvard University (BA); University of Chicago (MBA); Yale University (PhD)

Academic background
- Thesis: The Impact of Improved Consumer Information on Health Care Decision-Making: A Study of the Patient Self-Determination Act (1996)
- Doctoral advisor: John Rizzo

Academic work
- Discipline: Public health
- Institutions: Yale University; Vassar College

Elizabeth Howe Bradley (born 1962) is the eleventh president of Vassar College, a role she assumed on July 1, 2017. Bradley also holds a joint appointment as professor of political science and professor of science, technology, and society.

Previously Bradley was Brady-Johnson Professor of Grand Strategy and founder and faculty director of the Yale Global Health Leadership Institute at Yale University. She was also the head of Branford College at Yale University. In 2018, she was named a member of the Council of Foreign Affairs and elected to the National Academy of Medicine.

Bradley has published more than 300 peer-reviewed papers and has co-authored three books including The American Healthcare Paradox: Why Spending More Is Getting Us Less.

== Education and early career ==
Bradley graduated magna cum laude from Harvard University in 1984 with a Bachelor of Arts in economics. She received an MBA from the University of Chicago in 1986 specializing in health administration and organizational behavior. She earned her Ph.D. in 1996 from Yale University with a concentration in health policy and health economics.

Bradley was a hospital administrator at Massachusetts General Hospital before leading the Health Management Program at the Yale School of Public Health, Health Policy and Administration. She coordinated health management teaching efforts in joint programs for business and medical students at Yale University.

== Research and publications ==
Bradley's research focused on strengthening health care systems around the globe, including within the US, UK, China and several countries in Africa. Domestically, she has contributed to several projects including improving quality of cardiovascular care within hospital settings, understanding the relationship between state level social service spending and health outcomes, and improving the transition from acute to hospice and palliative care.

=== Articles and chapters ===
Bradley has published more than 335 peer-reviewed papers, some of which include:

- Leveraging the Social Determinants of Health: What Works?
- The Impact of Reported Hospice Preferred Practices on Hospital Utilization at the End of Life
- Variation In Health Outcomes: The Role Of Spending On Social Services, Public Health, And Health Care, 2000–09
- Patterns of collaboration among health care and social service providers in communities with lower health care utilization and costs
- Association between community social capital and hospital readmission rates
- Management Matters: A Leverage Point for Health Systems Strengthening in Global Health
- District-level health management and health system performance

=== Books ===
- Shortell and Kaluzny's Healthcare Management: Organization, Design and Behavior, 7th edition (Clifton Park, NY: Delmar, 2019).
- The American Health Care Paradox: Why Spending More Is Getting Us Less (New York, NY: Perseus Book Group, 2013).
- Public and Private Responsibilities in Long Term Care (Baltimore, MD: The Johns Hopkins University Press, 1998).

== International work ==
Bradley has led health system strengthening projects in international settings including China, Ethiopia, India, Liberia, Rwanda, South Africa and the United Kingdom and with Vassar is implementing a liberal arts curriculum in collaboration with the University of Global Health Equity and Partners in Health in Rwanda.

Bradley first arrived in Ethiopia in 2006 as part of an international coalition that included the Yale Global Health Leadership Institute (GHLI), the Clinton Health Access Initiative (CHAI), Harvard University, and others. Dr. Tedros Adhanom, then the Minister of Health, asked Bradley to advise 90 hospital CEOs and senior managers as part of the Ethiopian Hospital Management Initiative. Later, Bradley served as the principal investigator for the Ethiopian Hospital Management Initiative, a program run by the Centers for Disease Control and Prevention and the President's Emergency Plan for AIDS Relief to improve the functionality and quality of government hospitals in Ethiopia. She also served as the principal investigator for a project funded by the Bill and Melinda Gates Foundation, Developing the Long-Term Capability of Ethiopia's Health Extension Program Platform. Bradley's efforts focused on healthcare leadership capacity and management systems to advance Ethiopia's healthcare reform.

Bradley also assisted in establishing the Rwanda Human Resources for Health Program, which was recognized by the Clinton Global Initiative for its innovativeness. She was also the recipient of Bill & Melinda Gates Foundation grant that developed a framework of diffusion, dissemination, and widespread take up of health innovations.

== Brady-Johnson Program in Grand Strategy ==
Bradley was appointed as the director of the Brady-Johnson Program in Grand Strategy in January 2016. The Brady-Johnson Program in Grand Strategy prepares students to develop strategic thinking and leadership capacity across multiple sectors.

=== Publications ===
- "Grand Strategy and Global Health: The Case of Ethiopia"
- "Achieving Large Ends with Limited Means: Grand Strategy in Global Health"

=== Grand Strategy in the World ===
The concept of grand strategy, which is the interdisciplinary study of achieving large ends with limited means, has expanded to include practitioners in the field. The Brady-Johnson Program in Grand Strategy sponsors symposia at Yale University focused on leadership and strategic problem solving.

One such forum, The Leadership Forum for Strategic Impact, aims to increase the knowledge and skills of African women in senior positions within their nations' governments, and amplify women's effectiveness and influence by building a leadership network across Africa.

== Honors and recognition ==
- Wilbur Cross Medal
- Invited Speaker, MacLean Lecture for Clinical Medical Ethics, University of Chicago Medical School, 2019
- Invited Distinguished Speaker Colloquium, Indiana University School of Public Health, 2019
- Invited Speaker, Cosmopolitan Club, 2018
- Invited Speaker, Herman Biggs Society, 2018 Keynote Speaker
- Longer, Healthier Lives, and International Conference on Global Mental Health, Fountain House, NY 2018
- 2018 Champion for Justice, Legal Services of Hudson Valley
- 2018 William B. Graham Prize in Health Services Research from the Association of University Programs in Health Administration
- Member, World Economic Forum Global Agenda for Healthcare Systems
- John D. Thompson Prize for Young Investigators in health services research
- Teacher of the Year award from the Yale School of Public Health
- Investigator Award from the Donaghue Medical Research Foundation
- Connecticut Women's Hall of Fame: Global Impact Honoree, November, 2015
- Board of Governors, SRM University, Amaravatii, India
- Member, Council of Foreign Relations, 2018–present
- Panelist, Council of Foreign Relations: Free Speech on Campuses, 2018

== In the media ==
Bradley has been quoted in, or served as a contributor for, numerous publications on issues facing the liberal arts and higher education. She has been featured in:

- The New York Times
- Insider Higher Ed
- Forbes.com
- The Chronicle of Higher Education

== See also ==
- American health care reform
- Engaged Pluralism Initiative
- Health systems strengthening
- Health administration
- Yale School of Public Health
- Grand Strategy
- Hospice Care in the United States
- Branford College
- Health policy
- Health economics
- Liberal arts education
- Liberal arts college
- Van Jones Commencement Address, Vassar 2019

Academic offices
Preceded by Catharine Hill	President of Vassar College; 2017–present	Incumbent
