= Inauguration of Bill Clinton =

Inauguration of Bill Clinton may refer to:

- First inauguration of Bill Clinton, 1993
- Second inauguration of Bill Clinton, 1997

== See also ==
- The full text of Bill Clinton's First Inaugural Address at Wikisource
- The full text of Bill Clinton's Second Inaugural Address at Wikisource
