= Peter Stillman (academic) =

Peter Stillman is Professor of Political Science at Vassar College. He has taught there since 1970. He has an extensive range of publications and his interests cover modern political philosophy, especially that related to ecological thought, utopian political theory, and Hegel and Marx's political philosophy.

Stillman has all his academic degrees from Yale University.

Stillman notes that while Marx is often represented as an "economic determinist" (that is he believed economic structures basically determine almost every aspect of human life) and used simple models such as "base"/"superstructure" to support this, and that holding the view that individuals have the scope for meaningful thought and action "determined" by their social context it does not follow from this that there is a "direct causal relationship between "economic" circumstances and spheres such as religion, politics or culture".

== Publications ==
Stillman most noted works include: a book on Hegel's Philosophy of Spirit (1987), a co-edited translation of Rousseau's Confessions (1995), a collection of essays on The New Utopian Politics of Ursula K. Le Guin's The Dispossessed (2005), and a special issue of the journal Utopian Studies on Henry Neville's The Isle of Pines (2006). More recent work includes a co-authored book chapter with Adelaide Villmoare entitled "Social Justice after Katrina: The Need for a Revitalized Public Sphere" and a chapter in Andrew Davison and Himadeep Muppidi, eds., Europe and Its Boundaries: Words and Worlds, Within and Beyond. entitled "Hegel as a Colonial, Anti-Colonial, and Post-Colonial Thinker".
