= Catharine Bond Hill =

American college president and economics professor

Catharine "Cappy" Bond Hill
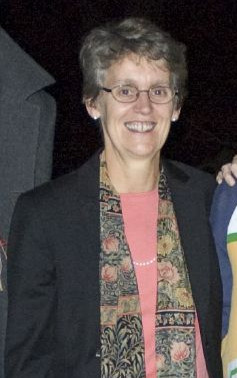
- Hill at the President's House in 2007

10th President of Vassar College
- In office 2006–2016
- Preceded by: Frances D. Fergusson
- Succeeded by: Elizabeth H. Bradley

Personal details
- Spouse: Kent J. Kildahl
- Children: 3
- Education: Williams College (BA); Brasenose College, Oxford (MA); Yale University (PhD)
- Profession: Economist

Catharine "Cappy" Bond Hill is the former president of Vassar College in Poughkeepsie, NY. She began in 2006, after former president Frances D. Fergusson retired. Before coming to Vassar, Hill was provost at Williams College. In September 2016 she became managing director of Ithaka S+R.

== Biography ==
After graduating with a BA degree summa cum laude from Williams College in 1976, Hill went to Brasenose College, Oxford, where she received an BA with first class honours and an Oxford MA in philosophy, politics and economics (PPE). She subsequently obtained a PhD degree in economics at Yale University in 1985.

In her early career Hill worked for The World Bank (1982–1987) and the Congressional Budget Office (1981–1982). In 1985, however, Hill returned to her alma mater to teach economics, and she began her role as Williams provost in July 1999, holding major financial and academic responsibilities. As chief financial officer of the college, she was responsible for the annual college budget and long-range financial planning, as well as the Controller's office. Hill was also responsible for the Williams College Museum of Art, the Williams College Libraries and the offices of Admissions, Financial Aid and Information Technology. In addition, she was a member of the Committee on Appointments and Promotions, which makes all reappointment and tenure decisions and allocates faculty positions. Hill chaired the Williams economics department from 1997 to 1999, as well as the college's Center for Development Economics from 1992 to 1994.

In what Hill has called one of the most transformative experiences of her life, she and her family lived from 1994 to 1997 in the Republic of Zambia, where she was the fiscal/trade advisor and then chief-of-party for the Harvard Institute for International Development's Project on Macroeconomic Reform. She has written widely from her experiences in Africa, including co-editing the books Promoting and Sustaining Economic Reform in Zambia (2004) and the widely reviewed Public Expenditure in Africa (1996).

== Vassar under Hill ==
Shortly after President Fergusson announced her retirement in 2005, Vassar began an extensive national search for her successor that yielded more than 200 candidates. Of those contenders, the Board of Trustees unanimously selected Hill as the tenth President of Vassar College. Hill succeeded Fergusson on July 1, 2006, and was officially inaugurated in a five-day celebration from October 25–29 that included events for students such as "Cappy and the Chocolate Factory", a party in the Students' Building featuring live entertainment and desserts such as "Cappy candy bars", a cotton candy wall and a chocolate fondue fountain. Hill highlighted her primary goal as improving affordability and access, and also, as she said at one of her first gatherings with students, to "articulate and build a consensus around a vision of an institution."

In one of the most notable events in Vassar's history, Hill returned the school to a need-blind admission policy, which ensures that the financial need of an applicant will not be a criterion considered in the admissions process. When she first became president, Hill made clear that of her priorities for Vassar's future, a robust financial aid program would be paramount. Hill announced the decision to go need-blind during her remarks at Vassar's 2007 Commencement ceremony. Under Hill's leadership, Vassar has also replaced loans with grants in financial aid for low-income families, in further efforts to increase access to higher education.

Hill announced in late March 2016 that she intended to step down from the presidency after the 2016–2017 academic year. Near the start of what was to be her final academic year as Vassar's president, Hill announced on July 20, 2016, that she would not be serving as president through the summer of 2017, but would instead be leaving Vassar three weeks later on August 15, 2016.

Academic offices
Preceded by Frances D. Fergusson	President of Vassar College; 2006–2016	Succeeded by Elizabeth H. Bradley
