= National Register of Historic Places listings in Manhattan above 110th Street =

The following properties and districts on Manhattan Island north of 110th Street, a significant portion of the New York City borough of Manhattan, are listed on the National Register of Historic Places. This includes listings on Manhattan Island as well as the neighborhood of Marble Hill, which is on the North American mainland and across the Harlem River from Manhattan Island. For properties and districts in other parts of Manhattan and the other islands of New York County, see National Register of Historic Places listings in Manhattan. The locations of National Register properties and districts (at least for all showing latitude and longitude coordinates below) may be seen in an online map by clicking on "Map of all coordinates".

This National Park Service list is complete through NPS recent listings posted November 13, 2026.

Contents: Counties in New York
Albany (Albany) – Allegany – Bronx – Broome – Cattaraugus – Cayuga – Chautauqua – Chemung – Chenango – Clinton – Columbia – Cortland – Delaware – Dutchess (Poughkeepsie, Rhinebeck) – Erie (Buffalo) – Essex – Franklin – Fulton – Genesee – Greene – Hamilton – Herkimer – Jefferson – Kings – Lewis – Livingston – Madison – Monroe (Rochester) – Montgomery – Nassau – New York (Below 14th Street, 14th to 59th Streets, 59th to 110th Streets, Above 110th Street, Islands) – Niagara (Niagara Falls) – Oneida – Onondaga (Syracuse) – Ontario – Orange – Orleans – Oswego – Otsego – Putnam – Queens – Rensselaer – Richmond – Rockland – St. Lawrence – Saratoga – Schenectady – Schoharie – Schuyler – Seneca – Steuben – Suffolk – Sullivan – Tioga – Tompkins – Ulster – Warren – Washington – Wayne – Westchester (Northern, Southern, New Rochelle, Peekskill, Yonkers) – Wyoming – Yates

== Listings above 110th Street ==
	Name on the Register	Image	Date listed	Location	City or town	Description
1	32nd Police Precinct Station House Complex	32nd Police Precinct Station House Complex	August 8, 2019 (#100004243)	1850–1854 Amsterdam Avenue; 40°49′47″N 73°56′41″W	Harlem	1870s Second Empire police station complex, now offices for community groups, reflects changing role of police at time of construction; was in use for almost a century
2	116th Street-Columbia University Subway Station (IRT)	116th Street-Columbia University Subway Station (IRT)	September 17, 2004 (#04001020)	Junction of Broadway and West 116th St. 40°48′28″N 73°57′52″W	Morningside Heights	Subway station (1 train)
3	145th Street Subway Station (IRT)	145th Street Subway Station (IRT)	March 30, 2005 (#05000231)	Under Lenox Avenue at the jct. with 145th St. 40°49′13″N 73°56′12″W	Harlem	Subway station (3 train)
4	168th Street Subway Station (IRT)	168th Street Subway Station (IRT)	March 30, 2005 (#05000232)	Under Broadway at the jct. of W. 168th St. 40°50′26″N 73°56′26″W	Washington Heights	Subway station (1 train). Lower set of tracks (1 train) is only station along Fort George Tunnel where its semicircular vaulted ceiling is visible.
5	181st Street Subway Station (IND)	181st Street Subway Station (IND)	March 30, 2005 (#05000233)	Fort Washington Ave., Vet. W. 185th and 181st Sts. 40°51′06″N 73°56′18″W	Washington Heights	Subway station (A train)
6	181st Street Subway Station (IRT)	181st Street Subway Station (IRT)	March 30, 2005 (#05000224)	Under St. Nicholas Ave. bet. W. 181st and W. 180th St.s; 40°50′58″N 73°56′03″W	Washington Heights	Subway station (1 train)
7	190th Street Subway Station (IND)	190th Street Subway Station (IND)	March 30, 2005 (#05000225)	Under Fort Washington Ave. bet. Fort Tryon Park (Cabrini Blvd.) and W. 190th St/ 40°51′32″N 73°56′05″W	Washington Heights	Subway station (A train)
8	207th Street Yard – Signal Service Building and Tower B	207th Street Yard – Signal Service Building and Tower B	February 9, 2006 (#06000018)	W. 215th St. bet. Tenth Ave. and the Harlem R 40°52′06″N 73°54′49″W	Inwood	
9	369th Regiment Armory	369th Regiment Armory	January 28, 1994 (#93001537)	2366 Fifth Ave. 40°49′03″N 73°56′04″W	Harlem	Home of the 369th Regiment, Harlem Hellfighters
10	Ansche Chesed Synagogue	Ansche Chesed Synagogue	June 9, 2014 (#14000289)	1883 Adam Clayton Powell Jr. Blvd. 40°48′07″N 73°57′11″W	Harlem	Built for Ansche Chesed, congregation founded in late 1820s and the largest synagogue in the country by mid-19th century. Now Mount Neboh Baptist Church.
11	Apollo Theater	Apollo Theater	November 17, 1983 (#83004059)	253 W. 125th St. 40°48′36″N 73°57′01″W	Harlem	Venue for African-American mid-20th century popular musicians
12	Audubon Park Historic District	Audubon Park Historic District	August 9, 2024 (#100010615)	Generally, Broadway, Riverside Drive, Riverside Drive West, West 155th, 156th, 157th, and West 158th Street, and Edward M. Morgan Place; 40°50′06″N 73°56′49″W	Washington Heights	
13	Audubon Terrace Historic District	Audubon Terrace Historic District	May 30, 1980 (#80002667)	Bounded by Broadway, W. 155th and W. 156th Sts. 40°50′00″N 73°56′49″W	Washington Heights	
14	John James Audubon Houses	John James Audubon Houses	July 5, 2022 (#100007881)	1909 Amsterdam Ave. 40°49′52″N 73°56′35″W	Hamilton Heights	
15	James Bailey House	James Bailey House	April 23, 1980 (#80002668)	10 St. Nicholas Pl. (at 150th St.); 40°49′38″N 73°56′33″W	Harlem	Former residence of circus impresario James Anthony Bailey
16	Mary McLeod Bethune Gardens	Mary McLeod Bethune Gardens	February 14, 2022 (#100007411)	1945 Amsterdam Ave. 40°49′57″N 73°56′32″W	Washington Heights	
17	Broadway Synagogue, Old	Broadway Synagogue, Old	January 11, 2002 (#01001440)	15 Old Broadway (nr 125th St & Bway); 40°48′55″N 73°57′27″W	Harlem	
18	Brooks and Hewitt Halls	Brooks and Hewitt Halls	November 15, 2003 (#03001151)	Jct. W. 116th St. and Claremont Ave. 40°48′30″N 73°57′54″W	Morningside Heights	
19	Calvary Methodist Episcopal Church	Calvary Methodist Episcopal Church	May 16, 2016 (#16000255)	211 W. 129th St., 2190 Adam Clayton Powell, Jr. Blvd. 40°48′43″N 73°56′48″W	Harlem	Elaborate Romanesque John Rochester Thomas-designed church was largest in city upon 1887 construction; later expanded and sold to black congregation which renamed it Salem United Methodist Church.
20	Casa Italiana	Casa Italiana	October 29, 1982 (#82001188)	1151–1161 Amsterdam Ave. (@ 116th); 40°48′26″N 73°57′39″W	Morningside Heights	
21	Central Harlem North Historic District	Central Harlem North Historic District	February 20, 2024 (#100009934)	Generally West 135th Street-West 144th Street, Adam Clayton Powell Jr. Boulevard, Lenox Avenue; 40°48′57″N 73°56′36″W	Harlem	
22	Chapel of the Intercession Complex and Trinity Cemetery	Chapel of the Intercession Complex and Trinity Cemetery	July 24, 1980 (#80002677)	550 W. 155th St. 40°49′56″N 73°56′50″W	Washington Heights	
23	Church of Notre Dame and Rectory	Church of Notre Dame and Rectory	May 6, 1980 (#80002678)	405 W. 114th St. and 40 Morningside Dr. 40°48′18″N 73°57′38″W	Morningside Heights	
24	College of the City of New York	College of the City of New York	September 7, 1984 (#84002763)	Bounded by Amsterdam Ave., St. Nicholas Terr., W. 138th, and W. 140th Sts. 40°49′15″N 73°56′58″W	Upper Manhattan	
25	Congregation Shaare Zedek of Harlem	Congregation Shaare Zedek of Harlem	February 23, 2015 (#15000031)	23 W. 118th St. 40°48′10″N 73°56′48″W	Harlem	1901 Moorish Revival synagogue built for one of city's oldest Jewish congregations has primarily been a Protestant church since 1930s serving local African-American community.
26	Will Marion Cook House	Will Marion Cook House	May 11, 1976 (#76001238)	221 W. 138th St. 40°49′04″N 73°56′37″W	Harlem	Musician Will Marion Cook lived here
27	Corsi Houses		May 28, 2025 (#100011889)	306 East 117th Street; 40°47′50″N 73°56′12″W	Harlem	
28	Croton Aqueduct (Old)	Croton Aqueduct (Old)	April 27, 1992 (#74001324)	Croton River, Westchester, to Highbridge Park, Manhattan; 41°13′35″N 73°51′19″W	Westchester County; The Bronx; Washington Heights in Manhattan	Large and complex water supply system for New York City; constructed between 1837 and 1842
29	Croton Aqueduct Gate House	Croton Aqueduct Gate House	September 22, 1983 (#83001721)	135th St. and Convent Ave. 40°49′06″N 73°57′06″W	Upper Manhattan	
30	Delta Psi, Alpha Chapter	Delta Psi, Alpha Chapter	April 26, 1996 (#96000484)	434 Riverside Dr. (@ 115th); 40°48′30″N 73°57′59″W	Morningside Heights	
31	Dominican Historic District	Dominican Historic District	January 24, 2025 (#100011048)	Roughly W 155th St., Broadway, Dyckman St., Harlem River Drive; 40°51′12″N 73°55′52″W	Washington Heights	A district covering much of Washington Heights, listed for the area's significance in Dominican American history.
32	Dorrance Brooks Square Historic District	Dorrance Brooks Square Historic District	August 8, 2019 (#100004239)	Edgecombe Avenue, West 136th–140th Streets; 40°49′08″N 73°56′45″W	Harlem	Neighborhood that takes its name from black serviceman killed during World War I was closely associated with many Harlem Renaissance figures; also contains many of the rowhouses that characterized Harlem's early development
33	Dunbar Apartments	Dunbar Apartments	March 29, 1979 (#79001601)	Bounded by 7th and 8th Aves. and W. 149th and 150th Sts. 40°49′30″N 73°56′20″W	Harlem	
34	Dyckman Street Subway Station (IRT)	Dyckman Street Subway Station (IRT)	September 17, 2004 (#04001021)	Bet. Hillside and St. Nicholas Aves., jct. of Dyckman St. and Nagle Ave. 40°51′39″N 73°55′34″W	Inwood	Subway station (1 train)
35	William Dyckman House	William Dyckman House	December 24, 1967 (#67000014)	4881 Broadway; 40°52′03″N 73°55′24″W	Inwood	Last remaining farmhouse in Manhattan, dating to late 18th century. Now a museum run by the Parks Department.
36	Earl Hall	Earl Hall	March 12, 2018 (#100002189)	2980 Broadway; 40°48′31″N 73°57′46″W	Morningside Heights	1902 McKim, Mead and White building was one of first on Columbia's Morningside Heights campus; later housed offices of Student Homophile League, first U.S. student LGBT organization
37	East Harlem Historic District	East Harlem Historic District	July 10, 2019 (#100004218)	Generally E. 111th–120th Sts., Park, Lexington, Pleasant, 1st–3rd Aves. 40°47′54″N 73°56′19″W	East Harlem	Neighborhood mostly developed between Civil War and World War I, reflecting occupancy by several different ethnic groups
38	Edward Kennedy "Duke" Ellington House	Edward Kennedy "Duke" Ellington House	May 11, 1976 (#76001239)	935 St. Nicholas Ave., Apt. 4A; 40°49′56″N 73°56′29″W	Harlem	Home of jazz legend Duke Ellington for much of his adult life
39	Elmendorf Reformed Church	Elmendorf Reformed Church	April 27, 2010 (#10000225)	171 E. 121st St. 40°48′05″N 73°56′18″W	Harlem	
40	Fire Hook and Ladder Company No. 14	Fire Hook and Ladder Company No. 14	May 22, 2013 (#13000309)	120 E. 125th St. 40°48′16″N 73°56′17″W	Harlem	currently accommodates the Caribbean Cultural Center African Diaspora Institute
41	First African Methodist Episcopal Church, Bethel	First African Methodist Episcopal Church, Bethel	November 9, 2018 (#100003116)	60 W. 132nd St. 40°48′41″N 73°56′28″W	Harlem	Neo-Gothic church houses one of Harlem's most important black churches, key to neighborhood development throughout 20th century; Marcus Garvey gave his first Harlem speech here.
42	Fort Tryon Park and the Cloisters	Fort Tryon Park and the Cloisters	December 19, 1978 (#78001870)	Broadway and Dyckman St. 40°51′39″N 73°55′57″W	Hudson Heights within Washington Heights	
43	Fort Washington Avenue Armory	Fort Washington Avenue Armory	March 2, 1995 (#95000085)	216 Fort Washington Ave. (jct. with 168th St.); 40°50′31″N 73°56′31″W	Washington Heights	1911 neoclassical armory was one of first in city in that style. Now home to National Track and Field Hall of Fame.
44	Fort Washington Presbyterian Church	Fort Washington Presbyterian Church	January 7, 2010 (#09001209)	21 Wadsworth Ave. 40°50′43″N 73°56′16″W	Washington Heights	
45	The Fourth Church of Christ, Scientist	The Fourth Church of Christ, Scientist	August 31, 2011 (#11000620)	551 Fort Washington Ave. 40°51′13″N 73°56′16″W	Washington Heights	
46	Fort Washington Site	Fort Washington Site	December 6, 1978 (#78001871)	Bennett Park, Ft. Washington Ave. at 183rd St. "Address Restricted"	Washington Heights	
47	Marcus Garvey Park	Marcus Garvey Park	April 28, 2025 (#100011764)	Mount Morris Park West, 120th St, Madison Ave, 124th Street; 40°48′16″N 73°56′37″W	Harlem, East Harlem	
48	General Grant National Memorial	General Grant National Memorial	October 15, 1966 (#66000055)	Riverside Dr. and W. 122nd St. 40°48′48″N 73°57′49″W	Morningside Heights	
49	Hamilton Grange National Memorial	Hamilton Grange National Memorial	October 15, 1966 (#66000097)	414 W. 141st Street; 40°49′17″N 73°56′50″W	Hamilton Heights	Home of Alexander Hamilton; relocated to St. Nicholas Park in 2008
50	Hamilton Heights Historic District	Hamilton Heights Historic District	September 30, 1983 (#83001727)	Roughly bounded by St. Nicholas and Amsterdam Aves, W. 145 and W. 140th Sts. 40°49′21″N 73°56′54″W	Hamilton Heights	
51	Harlem African Burial Ground	Harlem African Burial Ground	January 29, 2018 (#100002055)	2460 2nd Ave. 40°48′10″N 73°55′52″W	Harlem	Burial ground of enslaved Africans from 1660s to 1858 rediscovered by 21st-century archaeologists; currently under 126th Street bus garage but will be preserved in redevelopment
52	Harlem Courthouse	Harlem Courthouse	April 16, 1980 (#80002692)	170 E. 121st St. 40°48′04″N 73°56′21″W	Harlem	
53	Harlem Fire Watchtower	Harlem Fire Watchtower	June 21, 1976 (#76001240)	Marcus Garvey Park at E. 122nd St. 40°48′14″N 73°56′38″W	Harlem	Only survivor of 11 fire watchtowers once covering Manhattan and/or the city
54	Harlem River Houses	Harlem River Houses	December 18, 1979 (#79001605)	151st to 153rd St., Macombs Pl. and Harlem River Dr. 40°49′33″N 73°56′12″W	Harlem	
55	Harlem Savings Bank	Harlem Savings Bank	August 28, 2003 (#03000849)	124 E. 125th St. 40°48′13″N 73°56′20″W	Harlem	Demolished as of 2025
56	Matthew Henson Residence	Matthew Henson Residence	May 15, 1975 (#75001207)	246 W. 150th St., Apt. 3F; 40°49′32″N 73°56′19″W	Harlem	
57	High Bridge Aqueduct and Water Tower	High Bridge Aqueduct and Water Tower	December 4, 1972 (#72001560)	Harlem River at W. 170th St. and High Bridge Park; 40°50′34″N 73°55′57″W	Washington Heights	Bridge carrying the old Croton Aqueduct; part of the Croton Aqueduct National Historic Landmark designation
58	Hispanic Society of America Complex	Hispanic Society of America Complex	October 16, 2012 (#12001009)	613 W. 155th St. 40°50′01″N 73°56′47″W	Washington Heights	
59	Holy Cross African Orthodox Pro-Cathedral	Holy Cross African Orthodox Pro-Cathedral	November 9, 2017 (#100001803)	122 W. 129th St. 40°48′38″N 73°56′41″W	Harlem	First and only African Orthodox Church cathedral
60	Holyrood Protestant Episcopal Church	Holyrood Protestant Episcopal Church	October 29, 2020 (#100005702)	715 West 179th St. 40°50′58″N 73°56′20″W	Washington Heights	
61	Hotel Theresa	Hotel Theresa	June 16, 2005 (#05000618)	2082–2096 Adam Clayton Powell, Jr. Blvd. 40°48′31″N 73°56′58″W	Harlem	
62	Hudson View Gardens	Hudson View Gardens	February 16, 2016 (#16000020)	116 Pinehurst Ave. 40°51′12″N 73°56′20″W	Hudson Heights	Largest housing cooperative in the U.S. when built in early 1920s
63	Langston Hughes House	Langston Hughes House	October 29, 1982 (#82001198)	20 E. 127th St. 40°48′26″N 73°56′27″W	Harlem	Home of Langston Hughes, important African-American poet
64	International House	International House	September 10, 1999 (#99001129)	500 Riverside Dr. 40°48′49″N 73°57′43″W	Morningside Heights	
65	IRT Broadway Line Viaduct	IRT Broadway Line Viaduct	September 15, 1983 (#83001749)	W. 122nd St. to W. 135th St., Broadway; 40°49′12″N 73°57′20″W	Harlem	Viaduct station on the 1 train.
66	Ivey Delph Apartments	Ivey Delph Apartments	January 20, 2005 (#04001531)	17–19 Hamilton Terrace (at 141st St.); 40°49′20″N 73°56′50″W	Hamilton Heights	
67	Jeffrey's Hook Lighthouse	Jeffrey's Hook Lighthouse	May 29, 1979 (#79003130)	Fort Washington Park; 40°51′00″N 73°56′52″W	Washington Heights	Famous as Little Red Lighthouse underneath the giant G W bridge
68	James Weldon Johnson House	James Weldon Johnson House	May 11, 1976 (#76001241)	187 W. 135th St. 40°48′54″N 73°56′36″W	Harlem	Home of James Weldon Johnson
69	Jumel Terrace Historic District	Jumel Terrace Historic District	April 3, 1973 (#73001220)	W. 160th and 162nd Sts. between St. Nicholas and Edgecombe Aves. 40°50′05″N 73°56′21″W	Washington Heights	
70	Low Memorial Library, Columbia University	Low Memorial Library, Columbia University	December 23, 1987 (#87002599)	W. 116th St. between Broadway and Amsterdam Ave. 40°48′29″N 73°57′45″W	Morningside Heights	Largest granite domed building in U.S. Now used as Columbia's main administration building
71	Manhattan Avenue-West 120th–123rd Streets Historic District	Manhattan Avenue-West 120th–123rd Streets Historic District	January 17, 1992 (#91001920)	242–262 W. 120th St., 341–362 W. 121st St., 341–362 W. 122nd St., 344–373 123rd St., 481–553 Manhattan Ave. W side 40°48′32″N 73°57′19″W	Harlem	
72	Manhattanville Houses	Manhattanville Houses	June 17, 2024 (#100010432)	3224-3250 Broadway, 545-555 West 126th Street. 1414-1470 Amsterdam Avenue, 556-578 West 131st Street. 500-520 West 133rd Street; 40°48′58″N 73°57′26″W	Harlem	
73	Claude McKay Residence	Claude McKay Residence	December 8, 1976 (#76002143)	180 W. 135th St. 40°48′54″N 73°56′34″W	Harlem	Also known as Harlem YMCA
74	Milbank, Brinckerhoff, and Fiske Halls	Milbank, Brinckerhoff, and Fiske Halls	November 15, 2003 (#03001152)	Roughly bounded by W. 119th and W. 120th Sts., and Broadway and Claremont Aves. 40°48′38″N 73°57′48″W	Morningside Heights	
75	Minton's Playhouse	Minton's Playhouse	September 18, 1985 (#85002423)	206–210 W. 118th St. 40°48′17″N 73°57′12″W	Harlem	
76	Morris Park Senior Citizens Home		May 28, 2025 (#100011890)	17 E. 124th Street; 40°48′19″N 73°56′30″W	Harlem	
77	Morris-Jumel Mansion	Morris-Jumel Mansion	October 15, 1966 (#66000545)	160th St. and Edgecombe Ave. 40°50′04″N 73°56′19″W	Washington Heights	
78	Mount Morris Bank	Mount Morris Bank	December 7, 1989 (#89002087)	E. 125th St. and Park Ave. 40°48′19″N 73°56′22″W	Harlem	
79	Mount Morris Park Historic District	Mount Morris Park Historic District	February 6, 1973 (#73001221)	Bounded roughly by Lenox Ave., Mount Morris Park West, and W. 124th and W. 119th Sts. 40°48′17″N 73°56′49″W	Harlem	
80	New York Amsterdam News Building	New York Amsterdam News Building	May 11, 1976 (#76001247)	2293 7th Ave. 40°48′54″N 73°56′41″W	Harlem	Once offices of major early 20th-century African-American newspaper, New York Amsterdam News.
81	New York Presbyterian Church	New York Presbyterian Church	June 3, 1982 (#82003385)	151 W. 128th St & 7th Ave. 40°48′39″N 73°56′49″W	Harlem	Sign on church says it is Baptist
82	National Headquarters, March on Washington for Jobs and Freedom	National Headquarters, March on Washington for Jobs and Freedom	February 3, 2020 (#100004933)	170 W. 130th St. 40°48′42″N 73°56′44″W	Harlem	Townhouse where 1963 civil rights march where Martin Luther King Jr. gave his "I Have a Dream" speech was organized and planned
83	New York Public Library, 115th Street Branch	New York Public Library, 115th Street Branch	May 6, 1980 (#80002704)	203 W. 115th St. 40°48′10″N 73°57′14″W	Harlem	
84	New York Public Library, Fort Washington Branch	New York Public Library, Fort Washington Branch	August 27, 2020 (#100005470)	535 West 179th St. 40°50′52″N 73°56′02″W	Washington Heights	
85	New York Public Library, Hamilton Grange Branch	New York Public Library, Hamilton Grange Branch	July 23, 1981 (#81000410)	503 and 505 W. 145th St. 40°49′32″N 73°56′54″W	Washington Heights	
86	North Presbyterian Church	North Presbyterian Church	February 5, 2014 (#13001153)	525 W. 155th St. 40°49′57″N 73°56′39″W	Washington Heights	
87	Park and Tilford Building	Park and Tilford Building	May 1, 2009 (#09000258)	310 Lenox Ave. 40°48′29″N 73°56′41″W	Harlem	
88	Philosophy Hall	Philosophy Hall	July 31, 2003 (#03001046)	1150 Amsterdam Avenue; 40°48′26″N 73°57′41″W	Morningside Heights	Edwin Howard Armstrong invented FM radio in a basement lab
89	Public School 157	Public School 157	December 10, 1982 (#82003387)	327 St. Nicholas Ave. 40°48′42″N 73°57′09″W	Harlem	
90	Public School 186	Public School 186	May 15, 2017 (#100000997)	521 West 145th Street; 40°49′34″N 73°56′55″W	Hamilton Heights	
91	Pupin Physics Laboratories, Columbia University	Pupin Physics Laboratories, Columbia University	October 15, 1966 (#66000550)	Broadway and 120th St. 40°48′36″N 73°57′42″W	Morningside Heights	First successful atom splitting on U.S. soil performed in basement lab
92	Ralph J. Rangel Houses	Ralph J. Rangel Houses	June 10, 2026 (#100013100)	159-16 Harlem River Drive, et al. 40°50′00″N 73°56′12″W	Harlem	
93	Riverside Church	Riverside Church	December 12, 2012 (#12001036)	478, 490 Riverside Dr. & 81 Claremont Ave. 40°48′43″N 73°57′48″W	Morningside Heights	John D. Rockefeller and Harry Emerson Fosdick established this interdenominational church in 1930, known for its role in social and political activism. Its 392-foot (119 m) tower makes it the tallest church in the U.S.
94	Riverside Park and Drive	Riverside Park and Drive	September 2, 1983 (#83001743)	From 72nd St. to 129th St. 40°47′53″N 73°58′31″W	Upper West Side to Inwood	First major Robert Moses project in Manhattan sped travel to Bronx and made riverfront accessible as park
95	Paul Robeson Home	Paul Robeson Home	December 8, 1976 (#76001248)	555 Edgecombe Ave. 40°50′04″N 73°56′20″W	Washington Heights	
96	Jackie Robinson Houses		November 3, 2025 (#100012402)	110 E 129th Street and 111 E 128th Street; 40°48′26″N 73°56′10″W	East Harlem	
97	St. Andrew's Episcopal Church	St. Andrew's Episcopal Church	March 18, 1980 (#80002717)	2067 5th Ave. 40°48′28″N 73°56′33″W	Harlem	
98	St. Luke's Hospital	St. Luke's Hospital	May 20, 2019 (#100003934)	30 Morningside Drive; 40°48′19″N 73°57′39″W	Morningside Heights	Complex of 11 pavilions built mostly between 1896 and 1928 that epitomizes changing role of large urban hospital.
99	St. Nicholas Historic District	St. Nicholas Historic District	October 29, 1975 (#75001209)	W. 138th and W. 139th Sts. (both sides) between 7th and 8th Aves. 40°49′05″N 73°56′37″W	Harlem	
100	St. Philip's Church	St. Philip's Church	September 25, 2008 (#08000933)	210–216 West 134th St. 40°48′53″N 73°56′43″W	Harlem	
101	St. Walburga's Academy	St. Walburga's Academy	July 28, 2004 (#04000755)	630 Riverside Dr. (@ 140th); 40°49′27″N 73°57′18″W	Hamilton Heights	
102	Schomburg Center for Research in Black Culture	Schomburg Center for Research in Black Culture	September 21, 1978 (#78001881)	103 W. 135th St. 40°48′52″N 73°56′29″W	Harlem	
103	Sheffield Farms Stable	Sheffield Farms Stable	November 9, 2005 (#05001285)	3229 Broadway (@ 130th); 40°49′00″N 73°57′30″W	Manhattanville	
104	Students' Hall	Students' Hall	November 15, 2003 (#03001150)	Barnard College, 3005 Broadway; 40°48′32″N 73°57′52″W	Morningside Heights	built in 1916, now known as Barnard Hall
105	Substation 17	Substation 17	February 9, 2006 (#06000025)	127–129 Hillside Ave. (nr Ft Tryon); 40°51′36″N 73°55′37″W	Washington Heights	
106	Substation 219	Substation 219	February 9, 2006 (#06000023)	309 W. 133rd St. 40°48′56″N 73°56′55″W	Harlem	
107	Sugar Hill Historic District	Sugar Hill Historic District	April 11, 2002 (#02000360)	Roughly bounded by W. 155th St., 145th St., Bradhurst Ave. and Convent Ave. 40°49′38″N 73°56′36″W	Harlem	
108	Union Theological Seminary	Union Theological Seminary	April 23, 1980 (#80002725)	W. 120th St. and Broadway; 40°48′41″N 73°57′51″W	Morningside Heights	
109	US Post Office-Inwood Station	US Post Office-Inwood Station	May 11, 1989 (#88002361)	90 Vermilyea Ave. 40°51′58″N 73°55′26″W	Inwood	
110	Washington Bridge	Washington Bridge	September 22, 1983 (#83001645)	Between Amsterdam and Undercliff Aves. 40°50′42″N 73°55′29″W	Washington Heights	
111	West 114th Street Historic District	West 114th Street Historic District	July 16, 2014 (#14000399)	204–277 W. 114th St. 40°48′09″N 73°57′18″W	Harlem	Consists of the Randolph Houses, brick rowhouses erected in the last years of the 19th century, along with the Wadleigh High School for Girls. It eventually became one of Harlem's most desirable blocks when African-Americans started moving in during Great Migration.
112	West 147th–149th Streets Historic District	West 147th–149th Streets Historic District	May 18, 2003 (#03000407)	Roughly bounded by Eighth Ave., W. 149th St., Seventh Ave., and W. 147th Ave. 40°49′26″N 73°56′22″W	Harlem	
113	West Harlem Historic District	West Harlem Historic District	November 10, 2022 (#100008341)	West 135th to West 153rd Sts. between Amsterdam Ave. and Riverside Dr. 40°49′35″N 73°57′02″W	Harlem	

== Former listing ==
	Name on the Register	Image	Date listed	Date removed	Location	City or town	Description
1	Florence Mills House	Florence Mills House	December 8, 1976 (#76001244)	January 9, 2009	220 W. 135th St. 40°49′31″N 73°56′09″W	Harlem	Mistakenly designated National Historic Landmark of building that is blocks away from building where Florence Mills actually lived, which was since torn down. In 2009, the house was delisted from the NRHP and de-designated as NHL.

== See also ==
- County: National Register of Historic Places listings in New York County, New York
- State: National Register of Historic Places listings in New York
- Municipal: List of New York City Designated Landmarks in Manhattan above 110th Street
