= Los Pleneros de la 21 =

New York City-based drum and dance ensemble

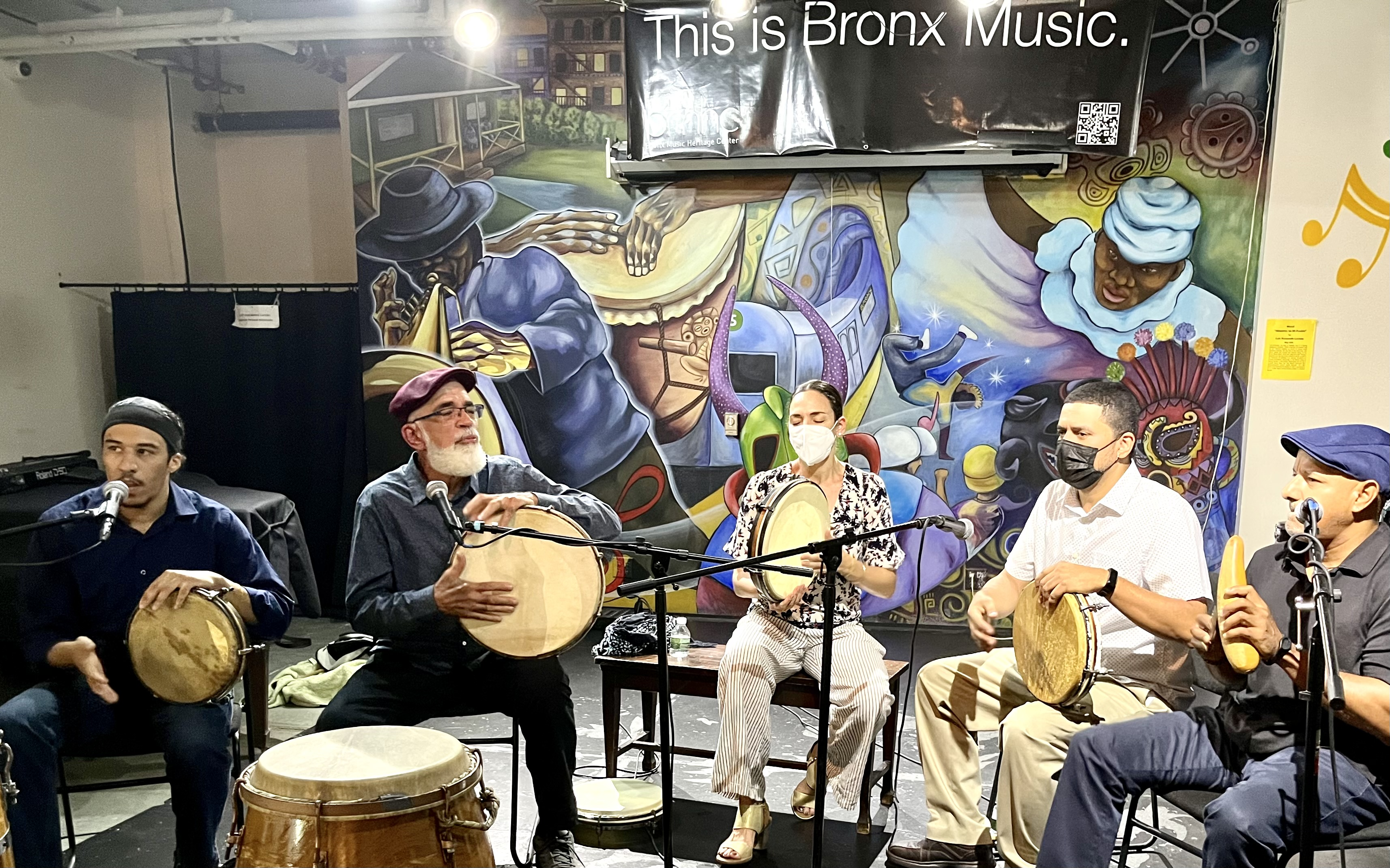

Background information
- Origin: New York City: Bronx and East Harlem
- Genres: Afro Puerto Rican Bomba and Plena Music and Dance
- Years active: 1983-present
- Labels: Smithsonian Folkways Recordings, Shanachie Records, Henry Street Records
- Website: https://www.losplenerosdela21.org/

Los Pleneros de la 21 is a New York City-based drum and dance ensemble that has been active since 1983. They specialize in Afro-Puerto Rican bomba and plena music and related dance forms. In addition to performing, they run a community-based, not-for-profit educational company dedicated to preserving and celebrating Puerto Rican traditional culture and "fostering the legacy and history of Puerto Rican artistic traditions of African and Creole descent."

== Group formation and early years ==
Los Pleneros 21 was founded by percussionist and educator Juan Gutiérrez, a native of Santurce, Puerto Rico. When Gutiérrez (b 1951) arrived in New York in 1976 to study percussion at the Manhattan School of Music, salsa was the dominant form of popular Latin Music. But he soon encountered a rich, community-based circuit of musicians in Harlem and the South Bronx who played older traditional styles of Cuban rumba and Puerto Rican jibaro, bomba, and plena music. In the early 1980s he met master plenero practitioner Marcial Reyes Arvelo, and together they formed a group in the summer of 1983. The name Los Pleneros de la Veintiuno came from a neighborhood in Santurce where many of the members were originally from. In addition to Gutiérrez and Arvelo, early members included singer/percussionists Pablo “Gallito” Ortiz, Sammy Tanco, Nelly Tanco, Francisco “Paquito” Rivera, José Rivera, Alberto “Tito” Cepeda, and Benjamin Flores; dancer Eugenia Ramos; and cuatro player Edgardo Miranda and keyboardist Carlos Suárez.

Los Pleneros 21's early performances were in New York’s Puerto Rican community, at social clubs, casitas (little houses) and celebrations such as the annual Las Fiestas de Cruz (Feast of the Holy Cross) and Fiesta Navideña (Christmas party). With the help of cultural workers René López and Marta Moreno Vega, and folklorists from the Caribbean Cultural Center African Diaspora Institute, City Lore, and the Ethnic Folk Arts Center (Center for Traditional Music and Dance), the group began playing for larger audiences at venues including Aaron Davis Hall (City College), Lincoln Center, Carnegie Hall, Central Park, the 92nd Street Y, and the Smithsonian Folklife Festival. They eventually toured internationally as cultural ambassadors to Russia, Puerto Rico, Cuba, Mexico, and Australia.

== Style and Repertoire ==
Los Pleneros de la 21 specialize in Afro-Puerto Rican styles of music that originated in coastal towns like Ponce and Mayagüez where large communities of enslaved Africans and their descendants worked in the sugarcane mills. Bomba is played on a set of skin-headed barrel drum and features competitive interaction between the dancer and lead subidor drummer. Plena fuses Spanish melodies and verse/chorus structures with African rhythms played on hand-held frame drums knows as panderetas. Although bomba and plena were originally community street music played solely on percussion instruments, commercial recordings by such figures as Manuel A. Jimenez ("El Canario)" (in the 1930s) and Rafael Antonio Cortijo (in the 1950s) brought piano, horns, and string bass into plena arrangements. By the time Los Pleneros recorded their first album in 1989, they were using the cuatro (a ten-stringed guitar) and melodica for chordal accompaniment and melodic breaks. Subsequently they would add piano, string bass, and occasionally horns. Smithsonian Folkways scholar Raquel Rivera has noted that while traditional street bomba and plena have remained at the core of their musical style, Los Pleneros del la 21 draws on more contemporary influences from jazz, salsa, and rap.

In terms of repertoire, Los Pleneros 21 performs traditional bombas and plenas as well as songs composed by Marcial Reyes Arvelo, Angel Louis Torruellas, Raphael Cepeda, Juan Gutiérrez, and other group members. Some songs chronicle the ups and downs of everyday life and community happenings. Others offer social commentary, such as Juan Gutierrez’s “Don Pedro,” a tribute to the legendary Puerto Rican nationalist leader. Gutiérrez's “Somos Boricuas” proclaims that Puerto Rican migrants to New York City still maintain pride in their Puerto Rican (“Boricuas”) identity and heritage.

== Cultural and Educational Mission ==
Soon after they came together as a performing group, Los Pleneros 21 began to receive grant support from the National Endowment for the Arts and the New York State Council on the Arts, and sponsorship from Young Audiences and Arts Connection, to organize music apprenticeships, conduct concerts and workshops in public schools and colleges, and offer youth and adult music classes. In 1996 Juan Gutierrez received a National Endowment for the Arts National Heritage Fellowship award for his outstanding contributions as an artist, teacher, mentor, and advocate for traditional Puerto Rican music and dance. According to their website, Los Pleneros 21’s cultural mission is to “promote cultural preservation, community connection, and accessible arts education, through the knowledge and appreciation of Puerto Rican Bomba and Plena.”

In the 1990s, Los Pleneros performed at events co-sponsored by The Institute of Puerto Rican Culture and New York City Lore assisting Puerto Ricans in their struggle against mining in Puerto Rico.

Los Pleneros were invited to Hawaii to be a part of the centennial celebration of Puerto Ricans in Hawaii. Their music is studied by Ted Solis, a musicologist interested in the Jíbaros of Puerto Rico who migrated to Hawaii.

A new generation of Nuyoricans now performs and teaches for Los Pleneros 21, including percussionist/dancer Nelson "Mateo" Gonzalez and vocalist/dancer Julia Gutiérrez-Rivera.

== Critical reception ==
The New York Times music critic Jon Pareles described Los Pleneros 21 as an “irresistible dance band,” whose “music is precise. All its intertwining parts—cuatro lines, call-and-response singing, drums, scrapers, tambourine and, for nontraditionalist spice, jazzy piano chords—add up to rhythms and melodies that sound light and transparent but never let up."

Another Times critic, Peter Watrous, dubbed Los Pleneros 21 “archivists of older Puerto Rican Musical forms.” After attending a live performance at New York’s Dance Theater Workshop, he observed that the group “made, intense, driving dance music…. the drumming, incendiary, complex, and precise, made the room rock.” Watrous gave a favorable review to the group’s 1996 Somos Boricuas album, commenting: “The melodies are gorgeous and the tunes perfectly arranged, precise rhythms making way for singing or a drum section.”

The group’s 2005 release, Para Todos Ustedes (Smithsonian Folkways Records), received a Grammy nomination for Best Traditional World Music Album. In his review of the album, The Guardian critic John Walters wrote that Los Pleneros “had been on a mission to preserve and revitalize the music of Puerto Rico .… The instrumental sound is highly rhythmic but the beats are warm and caressing, making for a music that is always energetic but rarely aggressive.” Julian Gerstin, writing for the journal Latin American Music Review, commented on the group’s “layers and layers of creative musicianship,” noting the jazz influenced accompaniments of cuatro player Edgardo Miranda and keyboardist Jose Lantigua.”

Several critics have noted that Los Pleneros 21 helped usher in a renaissance of bomba and plena music in New York City. Writing in 2000, culture critic Juan Flores called Los Pleneros 21 “the most celebrated plena group in New York.” In 2010 the Jazz Times described Los Pleneros as “an exceptional intergenerational mix of Puerto Rican Folk Masters and professional musicians” who had “pioneered the road for Bomba and Plena, paving the way many of the emerging Bomba and Plena groups in NY and beyond.”

== Discography ==
- Los Pleneros de la 21 &Conjunto Melodia: Puerto Rico, Puerto Rico Mi Tierra Natal (Shanachie Records, 1989)
- Somos Boricuas: We are Puerto Rican (Henry Street Records, 1996)
- Los Pleneros de la 21 & El Quinteto Criollo – Puerto Rico Tropical (Latitudes 1997)
- Para Todos Ustedes (Smithsonian Folkways Recordings, 2005)
- Los Pleneros de la 21 Live at Pregones: 35 Years of Bomba and Plena (TruthRevolution Recording Collective, 2018)

== Select video performances ==
- Los Pleneros de la 21 performs "Somos Boricuas" for Congahead - https://www.youtube.com/watch?v=9HANCoVDn7k&list=RDEMMTkvl2KhLlMdSAsruWIlFQ&start_radio=1
- Los Pleneros de la 21 performs "El Testigo" live at Smithsonian Folklife Festival 2005 - https://www.youtube.com/watch?v=5Sz2JvQYaT8
