= Yelaine Rodriguez =

Yelaine Rodriguez (born 1990) is an Afro-Dominican multidisciplinary artist, scholar, and curator. Her work explores themes of identity and Afro-Caribbean culture, specifically spirituality and its cultural blending over time. Her multimedia pieces often consist of handmade art worn by performers in research-based scripted projects examining race, religion and gender roles. Rodriguez is the founder of La Lucha: Dominican Republic & Haiti: One Island, an artist collective centered on the theme of the relationship between the Dominican Republic and Haiti.

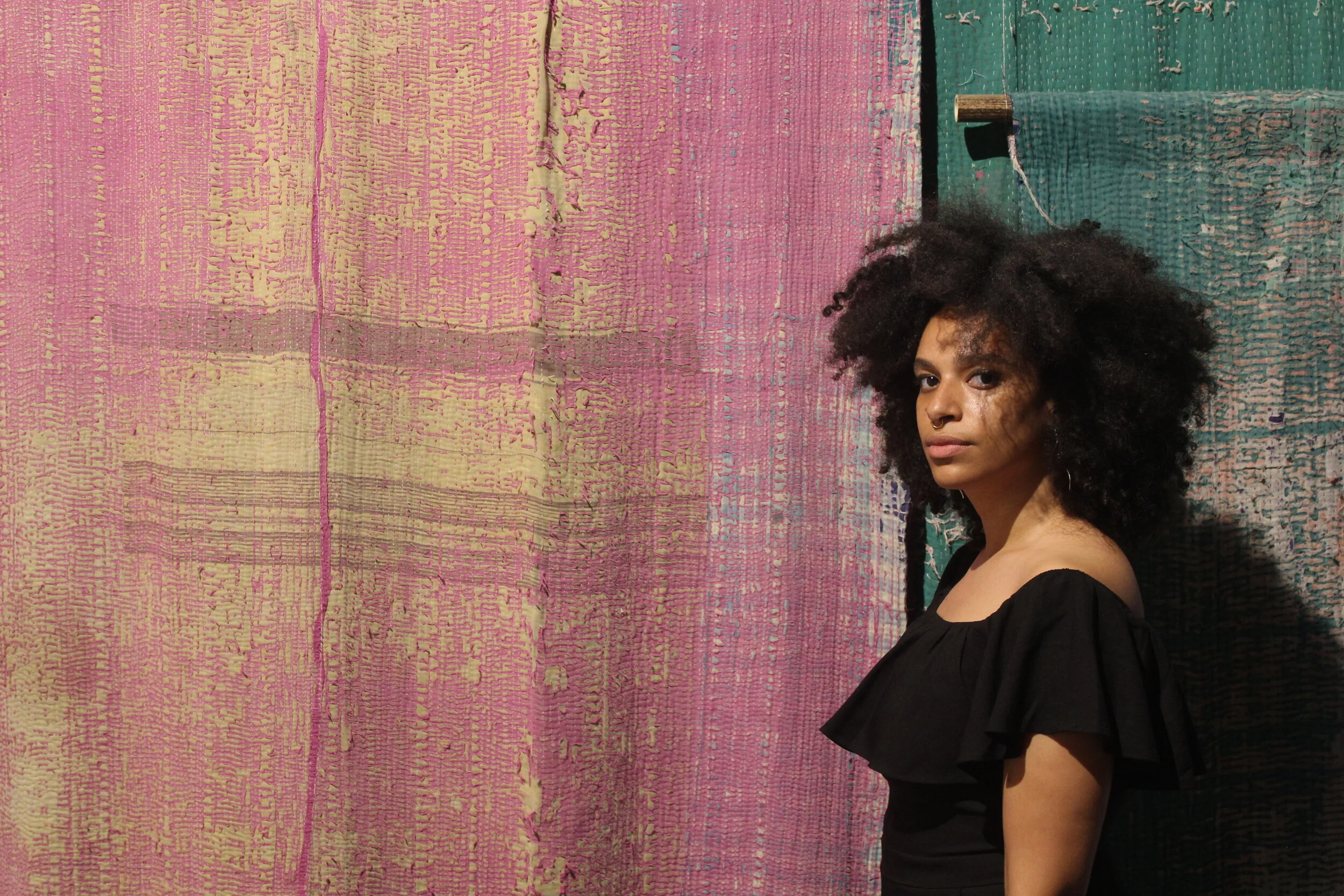
Yelaine Rodriguez Headshot

== Background and education ==
Yelaine Rodriguez was born in the Bronx, New York in 1990.

Rodriguez attended the Parsons School of Design at The New School and graduated with a BFA in fashion design in 2013. During her undergraduate time, Rodriguez received a scholarship to study fashion design at Central St. Martin's, London. She later graduated from NYU in 2021 with a master's degree in Latin American and Caribbean Studies and is currently pursuing a doctorate through Northwestern University.

Prior to her graduation from NYU and starting her doctoral studies, Yelaine Rodriguez received fellowships from both Van Lier at Wave Hill and the Caribbean Cultural Center African Diaspora Institute.

== Exhibitions and curations ==
In addition to creating her own art, Yelaine Rodriguez is a curator. She has put together various exhibitions for institutions such as The New School and the Latinx Project at NYU. Additionally, her work has been featured on Vogue and Elle magazines.

Rodriguez is the founder of La Lucha: Dominican Republic & Haiti: One Island, an artist collective centered on the theme of the relationship between the Dominican Republic and Haiti. This collective provides artists with opportunities for exhibitions, panels, and a space to discuss matters of nationalism, identity and race under the context of Haiti and the Dominican Republic.

== Artistic themes ==
A recurring theme in Yelaine Rodriguez's work is identity and she often incorporates her Afro-Caribbean background into the research and execution of her pieces.

As part of her studies at NYU, Rodriguez participated in a project inspired by the one hundred year anniversary of the 19th Amendment in the United States. The exhibited work includes the creation of wearable art, particularly inspired by Afro-Caribbean deities such as Oshun, the goddess of fertility, in an effort to explore gender roles, namely contributions of Afro-Caribbean religious sects and black women to the movement for suffrage.

In Yelaine Rodriguez's multimedia project Ebbó, she uses wearable art in a scripted dance performance piece to address assumptions about syncretic religions. Through her depiction of various Yoruba deities, the project highlights the blending of Yoruba and Catholic traditions in the Caribbean, and addresses potential cultural misconceptions.
