= Congregation Shaare Zedek Cemetery =

Former Jewish cemetery in Manhattan, New York City

Shaare Zedek Cemetery
- Interactive map of Shaare Zedek Cemetery

Details
- Established: about 1847
- Location: South side of East 88th Street between Park and Madison Avenues, New York City
- Country: US
- Coordinates: 40.781721°N 73.957039°W
- Type: Jewish
- Owned by: Congregation Shaare Zedek
- Size: 0.12 acres (490 m^{2})
- No. of graves: about 120
- Website: www.sznyc.org/frequently-asked-questions-bayside-cemetery

Congregation Shaare Zedek Cemetery was a small Jewish cemetery located on the south side of East 88th Street between Fourth (now Park) and Madison Avenues on the Upper East Side in Manhattan, and owned by Congregation Shaare Zedek on the Lower East Side. It opened in about 1847 on a lot that was just over 50 feet wide by 100 feet deep, and was filled to capacity by 1859.

In 1881, the New York City Board of Health granted permission for the congregation to disinter the bodies and move them to Bayside Cemetery in Queens, which Congregation Shaare Zedek also owned. However, the bodies were not moved at that time, and several years afterward, during construction of a building on one of the adjacent lots, the cemetery wall was damaged. The congregation then sought to move the bodies, but this was opposed by some former members of the congregation whose relatives were buried there. The congregation asked for a halakhic (religious) opinion from Rabbi Jacob Joseph, the chief rabbi of New York City. He replied that while the removal of bodies that might have been disturbed by the damaged wall was permitted, it was against Jewish law to disturb the other bodies.

At some time afterward, the bodies were moved, and the land was deeded to a woman named Mary Ehrman in 1899.
