= Harry Wolff =

Harry Wolff may refer to:

- Harry Wolff (boxer) (1905–1987), Swedish boxer
- Harry Wolff (booking agent) (1890–1934), American booking agent
- Harry Woolf, Baron Woolf (born 1933), British lawyer and life peer
- Harry Woolf (historian) (1923–2003), American educator and historian of science
