= Harry Lorraine =

Harry Lorraine may refer to:

- Harry Lorraine (American actor) (1873–1935), American actor
- Harry Lorraine (English actor) (1886–1934), English actor
- Harry Wolff (booking agent) (1890–1934), known as Harry Lorraine, American booking agent

== See also ==
- Harry Lorayne (born 1926), American magician and mnemonist
