= Chapel of the Intercession Complex and Trinity Cemetery =

Historic church in New York, United States

- U.S. National Register of Historic Places
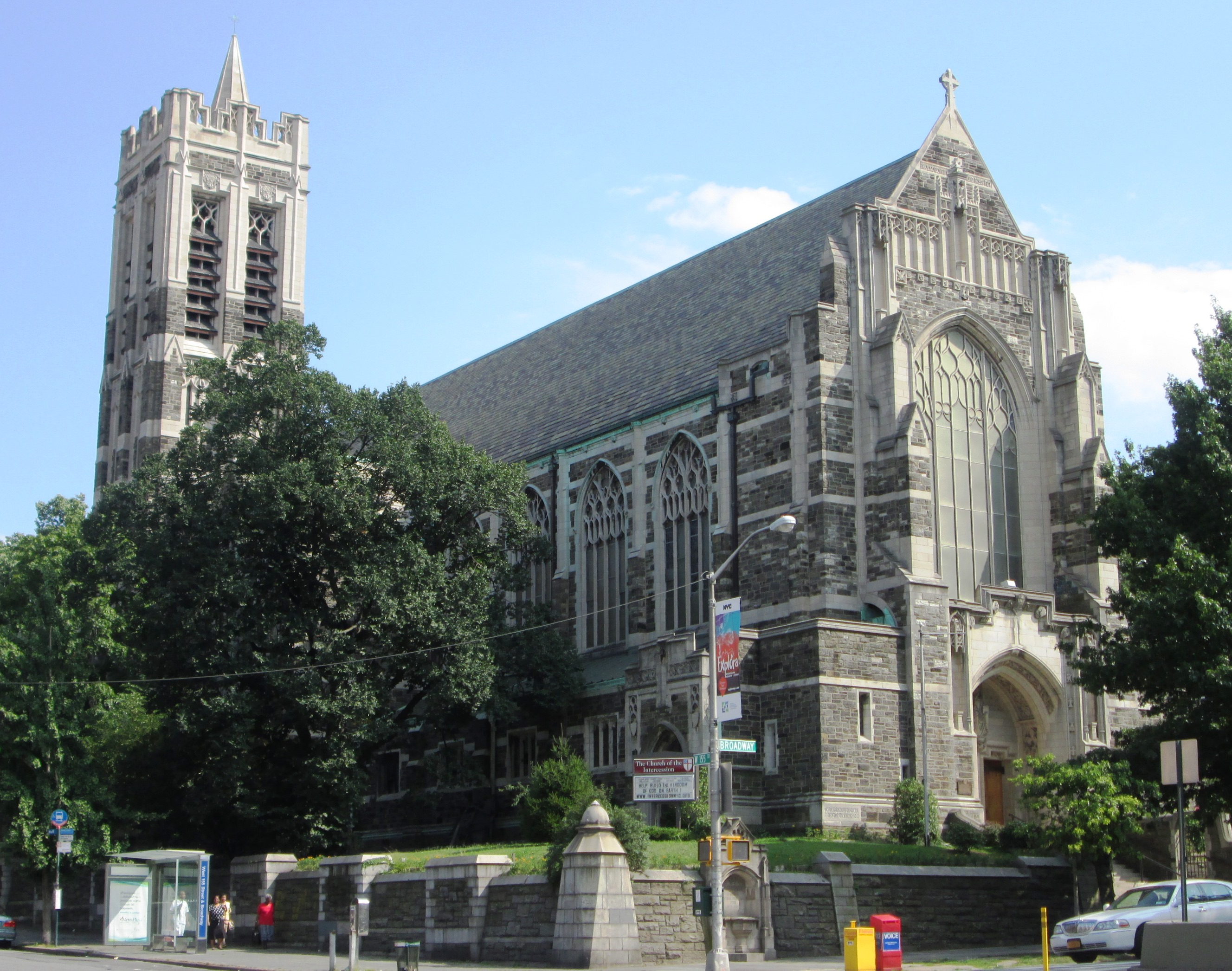
- Church of the Intercession in 2013
- Location: 550 West 155th Street; Manhattan, New York City
- Coordinates: 40°49′56″N 73°56′47″W
- Built: Cemetery: 1842, landscape elaborated 1871–1883; Church: 1911–1914
- Architect: Cemetery: Calvert Vaux; Church: Bertram Grosvenor Goodhue
- Architectural style: Church: Gothic Revival; Vicarage: Tudor Revival
- NRHP reference No.: 80002677
- Added to NRHP: July 24, 1980

The Chapel of the Intercession Complex and Trinity Cemetery is the joint name given in the National Register of Historic Places for two adjacent and closely related, but separate, historic properties in Upper Manhattan, New York City:

- Church of the Intercession
- Trinity Church Cemetery and Mausoleum, one of three components of the Trinity Church Cemetery

The joint listing was inscribed on the National Register in 1980.

== See also ==
- National Register of Historic Places listings in Manhattan above 110th Street
