= Patricia A. Singletary =

American pastor, educator and author (born 1948)

- Born: March 3, 1948 (age 78); New York, New York
- Education: Bachelor of Theology (1984; 1986 Masters of Religious Education (1986); Associate of Science & Bachelor of Science from SUNY Empire State (1991; Associate of Arts (1995); Investment banking - New York University (1996)

Patricia Ann Singletary is an American pastor, educator, author, and community organizer. She is the founder of Adoni Economic Enterprises, Inc. In 2002, she became the first female minister of Elmendorf Reformed Church in Harlem, the oldest religious congregation in Harlem dating back to 1660. Singletary is the author of “The African-American Guide to Buying Stock Without a Broker.” She is the co-founder of the Harlem African Burial Ground Task Force.

== Education ==
In 1984, Patricia A. Singletary received a Bachelor of Theology from the New World Bible Institute.

In 1986, Singletary received a Masters from the New World from the New World Bible Institute and Seminary.

In 1991, Singletary received an Associate of Science and Bachelor of Science SUNY Empire State College.

In 1995, Singletary received an Associate of Arts from Virginia University of Lynchburg, and completed training in investment banking at New York University in 1996. Also, in 1995, she received a Master of Divinity from New Brunswick Theological Seminary.

In 2010, she received a Doctor of Ministry degree from New Brunswick Theological Seminary.

== Career ==
In 1968, Singletary started working for Depository Trust Company as a senior underwriter. In 1990, she became account coordinator. In 1998 she became security specialist. She retired from Depository Trust Company in 2003.

On September 22, 2002, the Elmendorf Reformed Church extended a call for Singletary became the first female Minister. She accepted the call.

Singletary is a co-founder of the Harlem African Burial Ground Task Force, which was formed in 2009. The burial ground was a cemetery for enslaved Africans, and a part of the Reformed Low Dutch Church of Harlem.

The Elmendorf Reformed Church was later moved to its current location on East 121st Street in Harlem, New York City, New York.

In 1996, Singletary authored "The African-American Guide to Buying Stock Without a Broker".

== Awards ==
In 2019 Singletary received an alumni award from New Brunswick Theological Seminary.
