= Bethune Gardens =

Public housing development in Manhattan, New York

- NYCHA Property
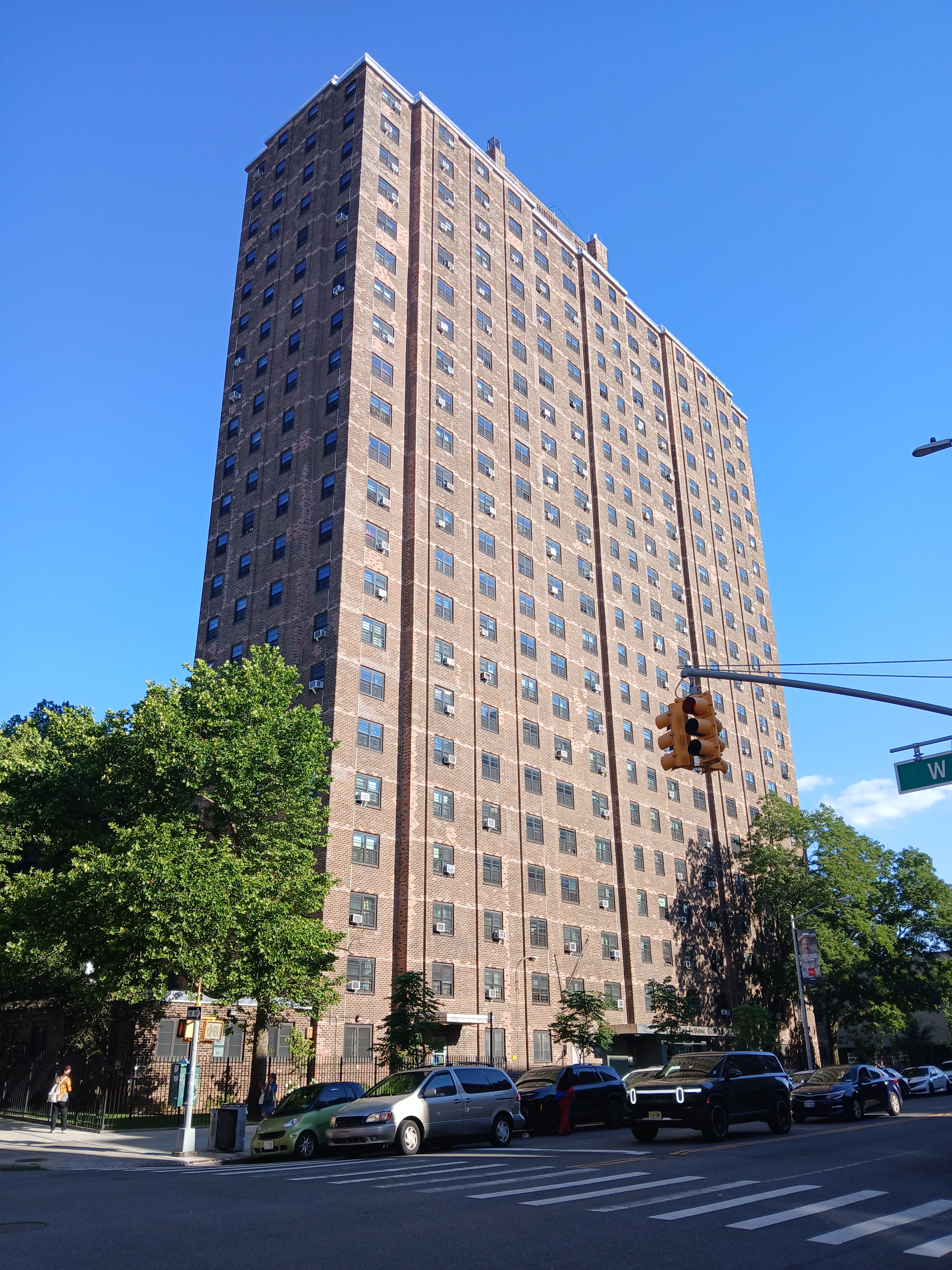
- Interactive map of Bethune Gardens
- Country: United States
- State: New York
- City: New York City
- Borough: Manhattan

Area
  - Total: 1.49 acres (0.60 ha)

Population
  - Total: 238
- Zip Code: 10032
- Mary McLeod Bethune Gardens
- U.S. National Register of Historic Places
- U.S. Historic district – Contributing property
- New York State Register of Historic Places
- Location within Manhattan Location within New York City Location within New York
- Location: 1945 Amsterdam Ave., Manhattan, New York
- Area: 1.49 acres (0.60 ha)
- Part of: Dominican Historic District (ID100011048)
- NRHP reference No.: 100007411
- NYSRHP No.: 06101.021424

Significant dates
- Added to NRHP: February 14, 2022
- Designated CP: January 24, 2025
- Designated NYSRHP: December 9, 2021

The Bethune Gardens is a NYCHA housing project building with 22 stories. It is located between Amsterdam and St. Nicholas Avenues and also between West 155th and 157th Streets in Washington Heights, Manhattan.

== History ==
Plans for the development were filed in 1964 by the architectural firm of Pomerance & Breines. This building was completed on March 31, 1967. The development is named after Mary McLeod Bethune. It was the first federally-funded senior housing vest-pocket development. Compared to NYCHA's superblock projects, such as those that line the west side of the FDR Drive south of 14th Street (the Riis Houses, Lillian Wald Houses and Baruch Houses), vest-pocket projects were smaller in design and only contained one to four buildings.

=== 21st century ===
The building was listed on the National Register of Historic Places (NRHP) on February 14, 2022. Residents of the local community had speculated that the nomination of the property for listing on the NRHP might have been driven by the investment tax credits available for the rehabilitation of the historic structures, which would make privatization under the Permanent Affordability Commitment Together (PACT) program more attractive to developers.

In January 2023, NYCHA closed on the financing of the PACT conversion of Bethune Gardens, along with Audubon Houses and Marshall Plaza. These complexes will be included in Rental Assistance Demonstration (RAD) part of section 8 to modernize the buildings through extensive renovations and replacements, invest in community spaces, and preserve affordability and residents' rights.

== See also ==
- New York City Housing Authority
- National Register of Historic Places listings in Manhattan above 110th Street
