= David Roitman =

American singer

Background information
- Born: November 1, 1884; Jusefpol, Podolia Governorate, Russian Empire
- Died: April 4, 1943 (aged 58) New York City, United States
- Occupation: Hazzan
- Instrument: vocals
- Years active: 1904–1943

David Roitman (November 1, 1884 – April 4, 1943) was a Russian-American hazzan and composer. Early in his career he worked as cantor in villages and cities in Russia such as Vilna and Odessa. In 1921 he immigrated to the United States and eventually joined the Congregation Shaare Zedek. Renowned for his lyric tenor compositional recordings and cantorial recitatives, Roitman became known as "the poet of the pulpit".

== Biography ==
Roitman was born to Mordecai and Mariom Roitman on November 1, 1884 at the Jusefpol village in the Russian province of Podolia. At the age of 12, he became the choral assistant to a cantor at the nearby town Lidvinke. He was then apprenticed to a series of cantors starting with Yankel Sorover and including Zeidel Rovner. Roitman would remain with Rovner throughout his teenage years. He studied music at Yeshiva College and continued his studies as a post-graduate at the Leningrad Conservatory.

Roitman worked as a cantor for five years at the Jewish Temple of Elisavetgrad, starting in 1904. From 1909 to 1912, he worked as cantor at Vilna. He became the chief cantor at the Ginsbourgh Synagogue in Leningrad starting in 1912, until the October Revolution of 1917 destroyed that congregation. During a 1918 pogrom, Roitman fled from Elisavetgrad to Odessa and there organized the Hebrew Music School, which the government would soon dissolve. Roitman lived in Kishinev, Moldova around the year 1920, making concert tours throughout Romania.

Roitman emigrated to the United States in 1921 and spent two years with the Congregation Ohev Shalom in Brooklyn. In 1924 he joined the Congregation Shaare Zedek in Manhattan, with which he would officiate until his death. During this time, he made concert tours in Europe and South America. After a long illness, Roitman died in New York City on April 4, 1943.

== Musical career ==
"Ashamnu Mikol Am," composed by David Roitman.

Roitman's voice was a lyric tenor, mellow in quality. He used mezza voce with a highly developed coloratura and falsetto. Roitman's renditions are noted for their clarity and improvisational simplicity. His style used a canonized system of practice and refinement known as nusaḥ hat'filla.

Roitman's earlier compositions reflected the sad fate of his people, while his later work emphasized a more dramatic and prophetic idiom. He made records while at Leningrad and Vilna, most of which remained unknown to the United States until archival releases in the 1970s. His only published composition during his lifetime was "Rachel Mevakkah Al Baneha" [Rachel Weeping for Her Children], which he wrote in Odessa. An unattributed recording by Yossele Rosenblatt made the composition popular in the United States even before Roitman immigrated there. Roitman's compositions "Ashamnu Mikol Am" and "Cantorial Anthology 2" also achieved widespread popularity during his lifetime.
