= P.S. 157 =

Historic school in Manhattan, New York

- U.S. National Register of Historic Places
- New York State Register of Historic Places
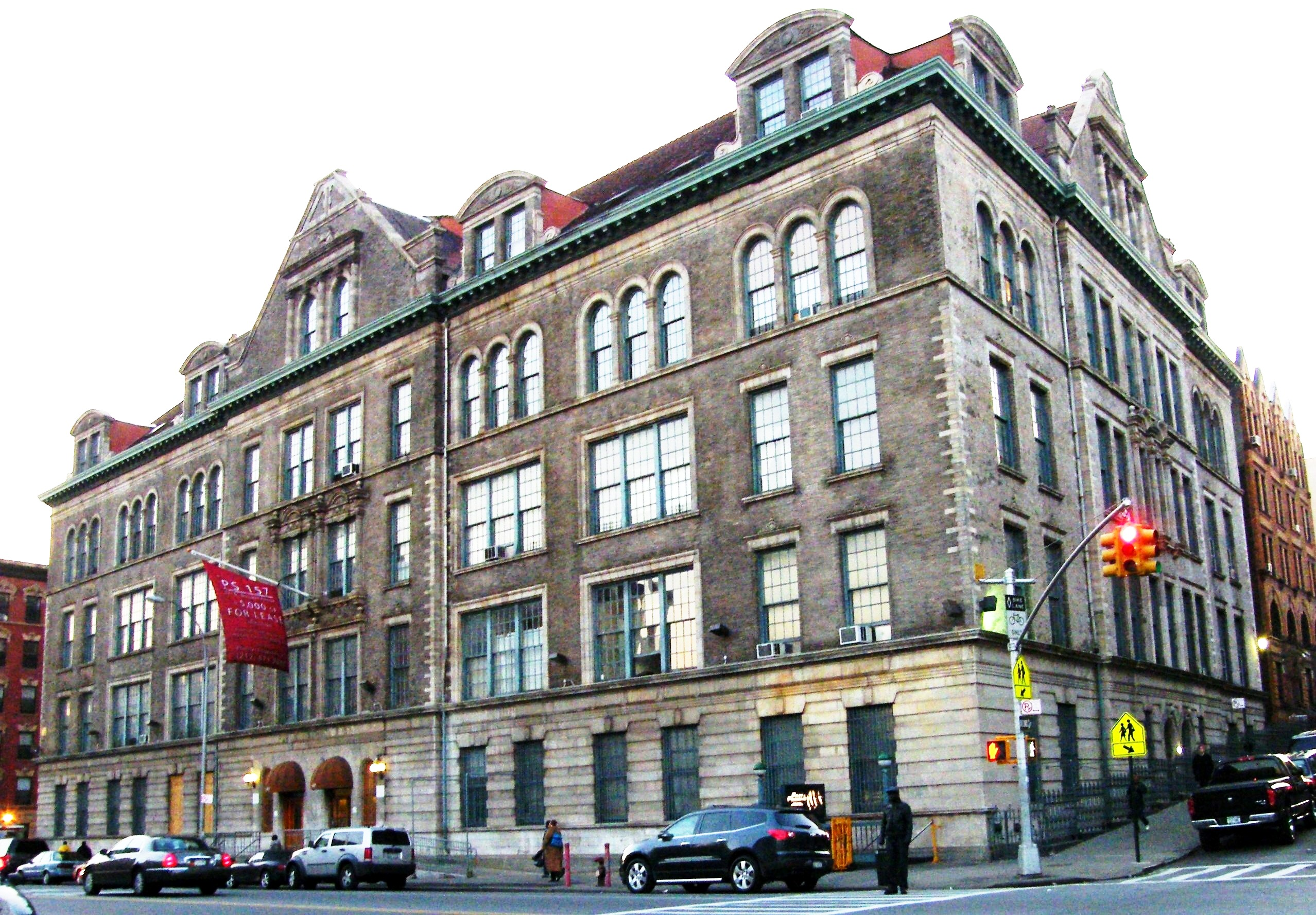
- (2009)

- Location within New York City Location within New York Location within the United States
- Location: 327 St. Nicholas Avenue; Harlem, Manhattan, New York City
- Coordinates: 40°48′42″N 73°57′9″W
- Built: 1896-99
- Architect: C. B. J. Snyder
- Architectural style: Renaissance Revival
- NRHP reference No.: 82003387
- NYSRHP No.: 06101.001415

Significant dates
- Added to NRHP: December 10, 1982
- Designated NYSRHP: November 5, 1981

P.S. 157 is a historic school building located at 327 St. Nicholas Avenue between West 126th and 127th Streets in the Harlem neighborhood of Manhattan, New York City. It was built from 1896 to 1899 and was designed by C. B. J. Snyder in the Renaissance Revival style. It ceased being a school in 1975, and was converted to rental apartments in 1993.

== History ==
Public School 157 signified a philosophical change in school design from what the Real Estate Record and Guide described as a tradition of "the school life of a child as a grinding, manufacturing process to which the factory style of building is eminently suitable." In 1891 Snyder took over as chief architect for the city's schools from George Debevois, whose buildings the Guide called "warehouses" that were a "civic disgrace." Work on the school began in 1896, and it opened in 1899 to 1,974 students in 45 classrooms.

Unlike Debevois' "factories", P.S. 157's design is derived from French and Flemish civic architecture. The limestone, brick and terra cotta building features dormers and a red tile roof, and could pass for a group of row houses if it was smaller in scale.

The building functioned as a school until 1975, when it became vacant, and was subject to vandalism. The drive to rehabilitate the building and covert it into apartments for low- and middle-income families began in the late 1970s, led by New York state's Harlem Urban Development Corporation and the city's Department of Housing, Preservation and Development. Work began on the project c.1989 and was completed in 1993. The building now consists of 73 rental apartments, some of them rent stabilized, on five floors.

P.S. 157 was added to the National Register of Historic Places on December 10, 1982.

== See also ==
- National Register of Historic Places listings in Manhattan above 110th Street
