= Firehouse, Hook & Ladder Company 14 =

Fire station in Manhattan, New York

- Fire Hook and Ladder Company No. 14
- U.S. National Register of Historic Places
- New York State Register of Historic Places
- New York City Landmark
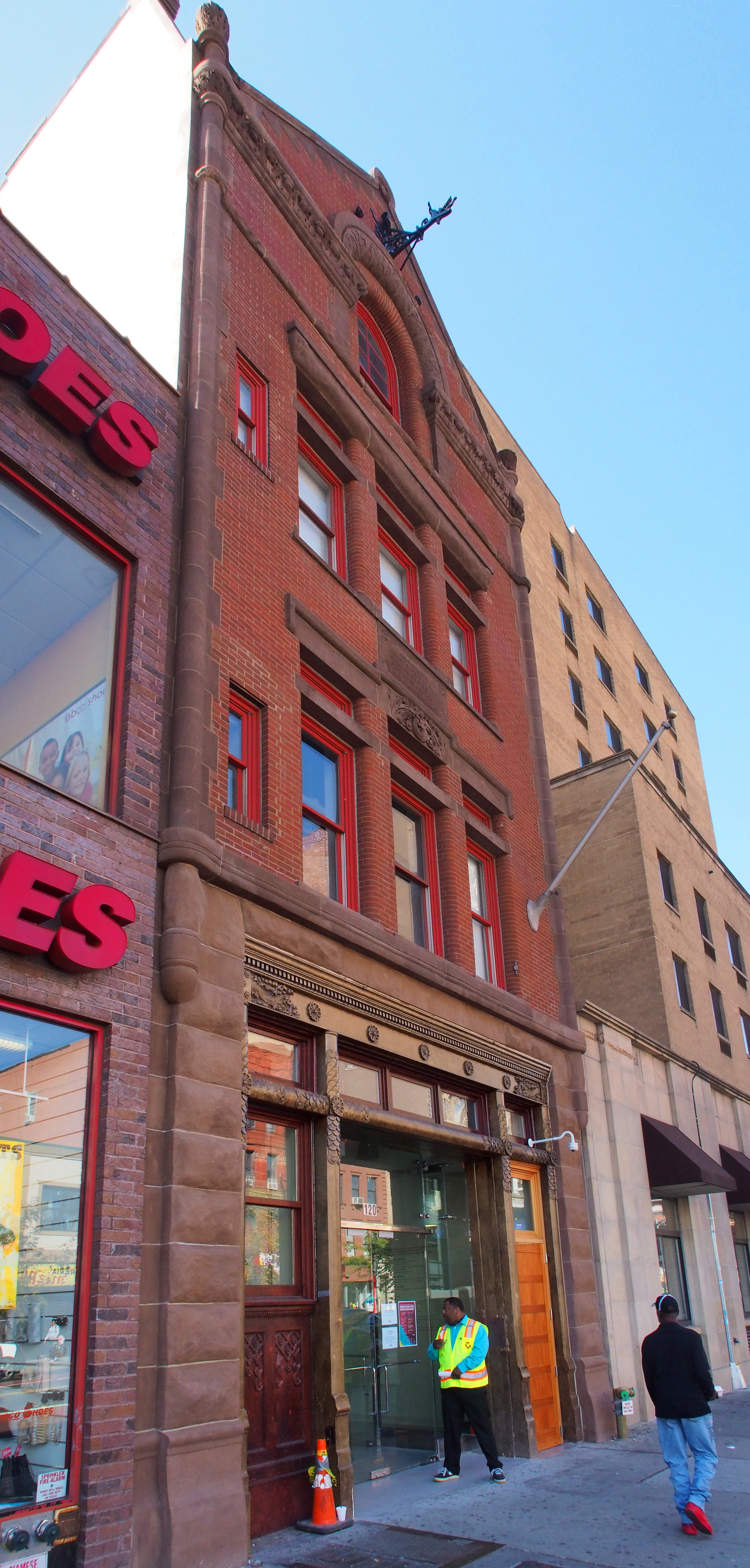

- Location within Manhattan Location within New York City Location within New York Location within the United States
- Location: 120 E. 125th St., New York, New York
- Coordinates: 40.8044°N 73.9382°W
- Area: less than one acre
- Built: 1888
- Architect: Napoleon LeBrun & Sons
- Architectural style: Romanesque
- NRHP reference No.: 13000309
- NYSRHP No.: 06101.000597
- NYCL No.: 1838

Significant dates
- Added to NRHP: 2013-05-22
- Designated NYSRHP: 2013-03-29
- Designated NYCL: 1997-06-17

Firehouse, Hook & Ladder Company 14, is a former New York City Fire Department firehouse at 120 East 125th Street in the East Harlem neighborhood of Manhattan, New York City, United States. The building, a Romanesque structure designed by Napoleon LeBrun & Sons, was originally built for Fire Hook and Ladder Company No. 14. It is clad in brick and stone and is generally four stories high, with a one-story rear annex. The building is listed on the National Register of Historic Places and is preserved by the New York City Landmarks Preservation Commission as an individual city landmark.

The site was originally occupied by Mechanics Company No. 7, replaced with Metropolitan Suburban Company 14 (later Hook and Ladder Company 14) in 1865. The current firehouse was constructed in 1888–1889 and used by Hook and Ladder Company 14 until 1975. Afterward, Engine Company 36 moved in, using the firehouse until 2003. The building was then unused until 2016 when the Caribbean Cultural Center African Diaspora Institute (CCCADI) moved in.

== Description ==
Fire Hook and Ladder Company No. 14 is located at 120 East 125th Street in the East Harlem neighborhood of Manhattan, New York City, United States. The firehouse was designed by Napoleon LeBrun & Sons, who designed 42 firehouses for the New York City Fire Department (FDNY) from 1880 to 1895. The building is one of several New York City firehouses that the firm designed at the middle of a city block. The firehouse's site has a frontage of 25 feet (7.6 m) on the street and extends 101 feet (31 m) into the interior of the block.

The building is built in the Romanesque Revival style and is clad in brick and stone. It is generally four stories high, with a one-story rear annex. It is identical to the firehouse of Engine Company No. 56 on the Upper West Side, which, like the Hook & Ladder Company No. 14 firehouse, also dates from the late 1880s. The historian Barbaralee Diamonstein-Spielvogel wrote in 2011 that the design showed "the firm's attention to setting, materials, and stylistic details". Christopher Gray of The New York Times in 2005 called the building "a pleasing mix of red brick and brownstone".

At street level, the first story has a central vehicular entrance surrounded by rusticated pieces of brownstone. The vehicular opening has a cast-iron frame, decorated with fish-scale and flame motifs. It is flanked symmetrically by two additional openings: a window to the east (left) and a wooden doorway to the west (right). The doors and frame are painted. The second and third stories are faced in brick, with vertical arrays of quoin-like brownstone blocks at either end of the street frontage. The center of the facade has large tripartite windows, while the eastern (left) edge has two small windows overlooking bathrooms. The sash windows have aluminum frames, which replaced the original wood frames. A spandrel panel between these stories contains a stone tablet naming the architects and fire commissioners at the time of the building's construction. The fourth story, housed within a slate mansard roof, contains a brownstone-trimmed gable, which has an arched window with an ovolo molding. A jib for the building's hay loft, shaped like a dragon, is mounted from the gable.

The ground floor has an open plan layout, which housed apparatus and vehicles; when horse-drawn vehicles were used, the firehouse's horses also lived on the ground floor. There were a captain's office, dormitories, and kitchen on the second and third stories and a hay loft above. Design details include a circular iron staircase, a pressed-tin ceiling, a hose-drying tower, and holes in the floor for a firefighter pole, although the pole itself has since been removed.

== History ==
The Metropolitan Fire Department (the FDNY's predecessor) was formed in March 1865 through the merger of several private fire companies. The New York City Common Council attempted to take control of existing firehouses from the ruling Tammany Hall political machine by banning firehouse construction. As part of the Metropolitan Fire Department's creation, Metropolitan Suburban Ladder Company No. 14 was organized in October 1865. It replaced Mechanics Company No. 7, a volunteer fire squad. Suburban Ladder Company 14 was classified as a suburban fire squad because of Upper Manhattan's low population at the time, with lower wages and less technologically advanced apparatus compared with the urban fire squads. In 1868, the suburban squad became Hook and Ladder Company 14.

By the late 1870s, the area around Harlem was rapidly developing because of population increases in New York City, as well as new elevated rail lines serving the area; this prompted the development of new civic infrastructure, including schools, courthouses, libraries, and firehouses. To accommodate the need for additional firehouses in the neighborhood, the current firehouse was constructed in 1888–1889. To alert people to fires, members of the company originally rang the bell in the nearby Harlem Fire Watchtower twice a day.

The firehouse was used by Hook and Ladder Company 14 until 1975, when it moved to Third Avenue; the firehouse was then used by Engine Company 36. The New York City Landmarks Preservation Commission considered designating the building as a landmark in the early 1990s and granted the designation in 1997. Due to the city government's fiscal shortfalls, Engine Company 36 was disbanded in 2003, despite significant community opposition to the closure. The building was then abandoned for several years. The building was also added to the National Register of Historic Places in 2013.

In 2013, the city government decided to decommission five firehouses, including the firehouse for Engine Company 36, and turn them into cultural centers. The city government agreed to let the Caribbean Cultural Center African Diaspora Institute (CCCADI) occupy the building, and the CCCADI bought it for $1. A renovation began in September 2014 after city officials allocated $9.3 million for the renovation. The CCCADI moved into the firehouse of Hook and Ladder Company 14 in 2016, opening an art gallery there. Although the institute expanded to a nearby building in 2022, it continued to use the firehouse.

== See also ==
- List of New York City Designated Landmarks in Manhattan above 110th Street
- National Register of Historic Places listings in Manhattan above 110th Street

== Sources ==
- Fire Hook & Ladder Company No. 14 (now Fire Engine Company No. 36) (PDF) (Report). New York City Landmarks Preservation Commission. June 17, 1997.
- Fire Hook & Ladder Company No. 14 (now Fire Engine Company No. 36) (Report). National Register of Historic Places, National Park Service. March 29, 2013. Report hosted on cris.parks.ny.gov (On "Search" tab: Criteria → Lookup → National Register number: 13NR06420 → NR Nomination Form).
