= St. Walburga's Academy =

- U.S. National Register of Historic Places
- U.S. Historic district – Contributing property
- New York State Register of Historic Places
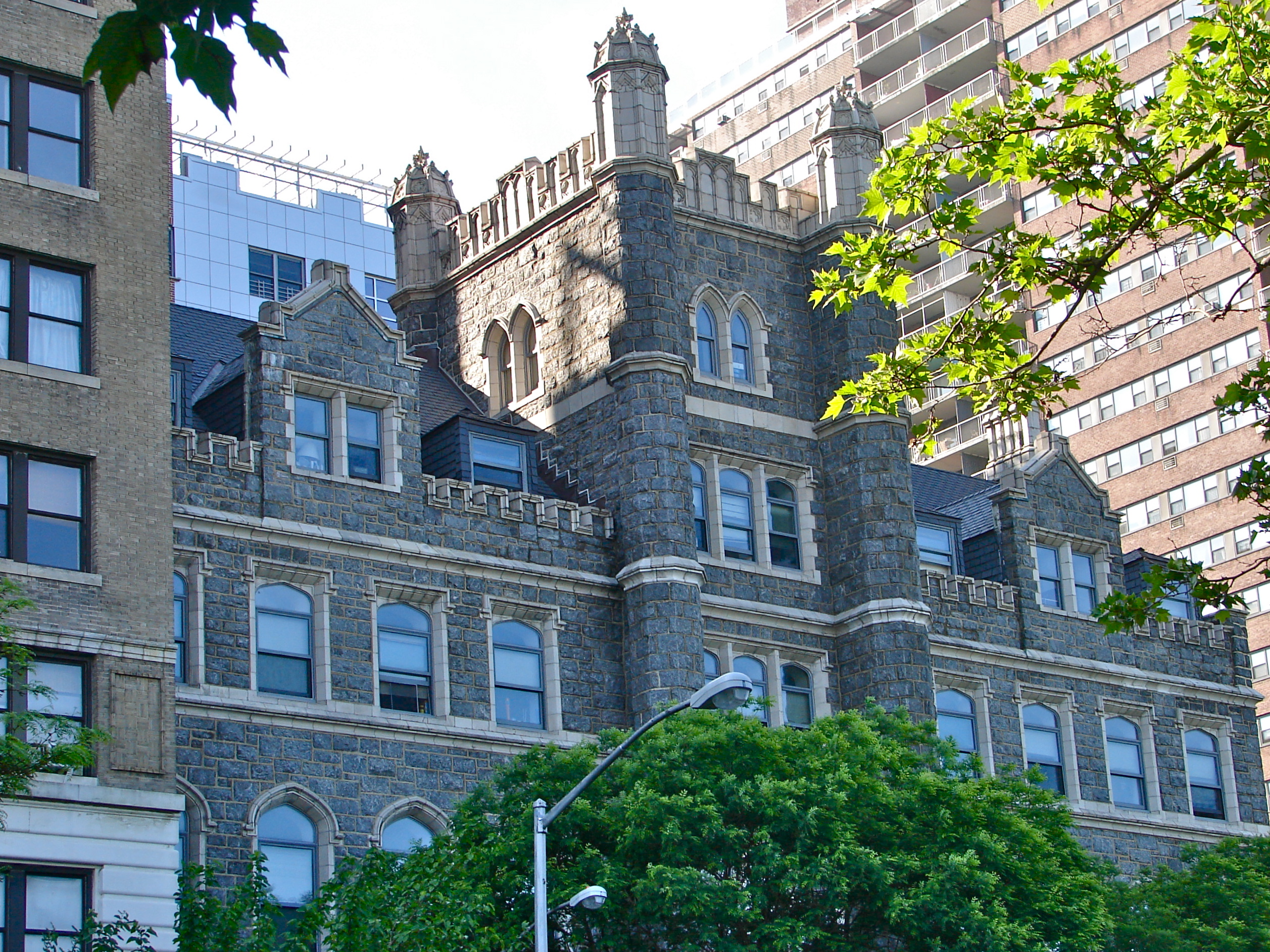

- Location within New York City Location within New York Location within the United States
- Location: 630 Riverside Dr., New York, New York
- Coordinates: 40°49′27″N 73°57′18″W
- Area: less than one acre
- Built: 1911
- Architect: Kearney, John W.
- Architectural style: Late Gothic Revival
- Part of: West Harlem Historic District (ID100008341)
- NRHP reference No.: 04000755
- NYSRHP No.: 06101.011546

Significant dates
- Added to NRHP: July 28, 2004
- Designated NYSRHP: April 6, 2004

St. Walburga's Academy of the Society of the Holy Child Jesus is an historic academy located at 630 Riverside Drive and 140th Street in Manhattan, New York City.

Construction on the Gothic Revival structure designed by architect John W. Kearney began in 1911, and in 1913 the school opened, serving as both a boarding and day school for girls. In 1957, the school relocated to Rye, New York and changed its name to the School of the Holy Child. In 1980, school was the filming location for the film, Inferno. The Fortune Society, a non-profit organization dedicated to assisting persons released from prison in reintegrating into society, bought the property in 1998 and refurbished it. In April 2002, the newly named Fortune Academy opened and can house up to 90 homeless previously incarcerated individuals. On July 28, 2004, St. Walburga's Academy was added to the National Register of Historic Places.

== See also ==
- National Register of Historic Places listings in Manhattan above 110th Street
