= Congregation Shaare Zedek (Manhattan) =

Synagogue in Manhattan, New York

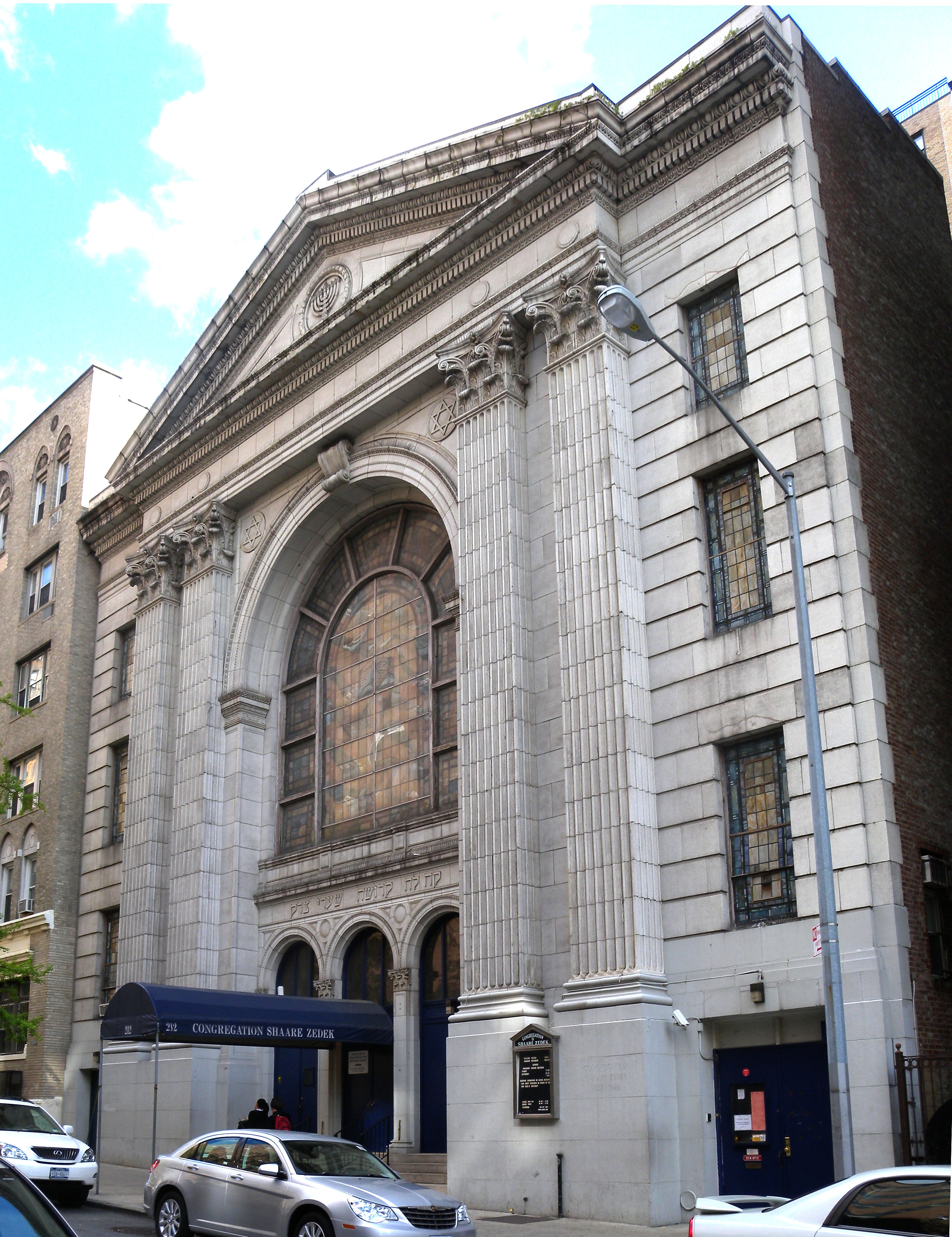
- Building as seen in 2010. Congregation has since been demolished and is now located within the new structure at the same location.

- Location in Upper West Side, Manhattan

Religion
- Affiliation: Judaism
- Ecclesiastical or organisational status: Synagogue
- Leadership: Rabbi Aaron Starr; Rabbi Yonatan Dahlen
- Status: Active

Location
- Location: 212 West 93rd Street, Manhattan, New York City, New York
- Country: United States
- Coordinates: 40°47′27.2″N 73°58′23.6″W

Architecture
- Architects: Somerfeld and Steckler (1923); Eran Chen/ODA Architecture (2022)
- Type: Synagogue
- Style: Classical Revival (1923); Modernist (2022)
- Established: 1837 (as a congregation)
- Groundbreaking: 1922 (212 West 93rd Street)
- Completed: 1850 (38 Henry Street; #1); 1891 (38 Henry Street; #2); 1900 (25 West 118th Street); 1923 (212 West 93rd Street: #1); 2022 (212 West 93rd Street; #2)
- Materials: Granite (1923); Concrete (2022)

Website
- sznyc.org

Congregation Shaare Zedek (Gates of Righteousness) is a non-denominational synagogue located on West 93rd Street in Manhattan, New York City, New York, United States. In 2017, despite the efforts of preservationists to save it, a New York State Supreme Court judge approved the sale of the building to a developer who planned to tear it down and build a 14-story condominium.

== History ==
Founded in 1837, by Polish Jews, Shaare Zedek is the third oldest Jewish congregation in New York City. The congregation originally met at 38 Henry Street on Manhattan's Lower East Side. In 1850, it purchased a building at 38 Henry Street (still on the Lower East Side) that was originally built by a Quaker congregation in 1828 that had been converted for use as a synagogue by congregation Ansche Chesed in 1840. The congregation replaced this building with a new building on the same property in 1891, and in 1900 opened a Moorish style branch synagogue at 25 West 118th Street in the newly fashionable neighborhood of Harlem, in time for the Jewish New Year. The Henry Street building was sold to Congregation Mishkan Israel Anshei Suwalk in 1911, and the two branches consolidated uptown. In 1922, the Harlem building was sold to Chevra Talmud Torah Augustow as their current Neoclassical building was being designed and built by the architecture firm of Sommerfeld and Steckler.

Over the years, Shaare Zedek has been home to rabbis that include Philip R. Alstat, Israel Goldfarb, and Isaac Kurtzlow along with such cantors as David Roitman, Frank Birnbaum and Martin Kozlowsky.

=== Recent years ===
From 2009 to 2014, the congregation was led by Rabbi William Plevan. Although Shaare Zedek was the last Conservative synagogue in the area to allow fully egalitarian worship, women now participate in every aspect of the service and the congregation was recently served by a female rabbi. While preserving the traditional liturgy quite closely and committing to a fairly strict observance of Jewish law, the community is generally politically and socially progressive.

In October 2016, citing financial problems connected with the upkeep of the building as well as the Bayside Cemetery in Queens, the synagogue announced that it had signed a contract with a developer to sell the building, which would be replaced with a 14-story condominium, of which Shaare Zedek would own and occupy three floors. The sale price was $34.3 million, which would enable the synagogue to "get out of the cemetery business," according to its president. In response, resident of the area, concerned not only about the loss of an historic building, but about the loss of air and light from the planned condominium, filed a Request for Evaluation with the New York City Landmarks Preservation Commission in an attempt to have the building landmarked. They wanted the commission to hold an emergency hearing before the building was torn down. In July 2017 the appeals of the West Nineties Neighborhood Coalition to the NYCLPC and Community Board 7 and city officials were dismissed, and a State Supreme Court judge approved the synagogue's petition to sell the building to the developer, leaving the preservation effort out of options. In October 2017, the congregation moved from 212 West 93rd Street to a temporary location at the Franciscan Center on West 97th Street. The redevelopment of the site across 14 floors with a 61,000-square-foot (5,700 m^{2}) gross floor area, in partnership with Landsea Holdings incorporated a new synagogue, twenty apartments, and a commercial unit. The redevelopment was completed in 2022. In July 2023 the apartments were sold to Landsea for $24.5 million; and the following month it was announced that the yeshiva Hadar Institute will move into the complex as a tenant of the congregation.

== Kehilat Hadar Shaare Zedek ==
In 2018, Congregation Shaare Zedek and the lay-led, traditional egalitarian minyan Kehilat Hadar opened discussions of a possible merger of the two communities. In October 2019, the two congregations commenced joint operations, holding weekly Shabbat morning services together as a single minyan at the Solomon Schechter School of Manhattan on W. 100th Street. In July 2024, the two communities moved together into the reconstructed synagogue building at 210 W. 93rd Street. In 2025, the two congregations voted to begin merging the communities.

The synagogue building at 210 W. 93rd Street, built on the site of the 1920s synagogue building at 212 W. 93rd Street, features stained glass from the earlier building in its sanctuary. The ark, by Judaica designer Amy Reichert, accentuates the colors of the original stained glass.

The Hadar Institute also resides at 210 W. 93rd Street, as a long-term tenant.

== See also ==
- Congregation Shaare Zedek Cemetery
- Bayside Cemetery
