= Harlem African Burial Ground =

Former cemetery in New York City

- U.S. National Register of Historic Places
- Location within New York City
- Location: 2460 2nd Ave. East Harlem, Manhattan, New York
- Coordinates: 40.8028°N 73.9312°W
- Built: 1668
- NRHP reference No.: 100002055
- Added to NRHP: January 29, 2018

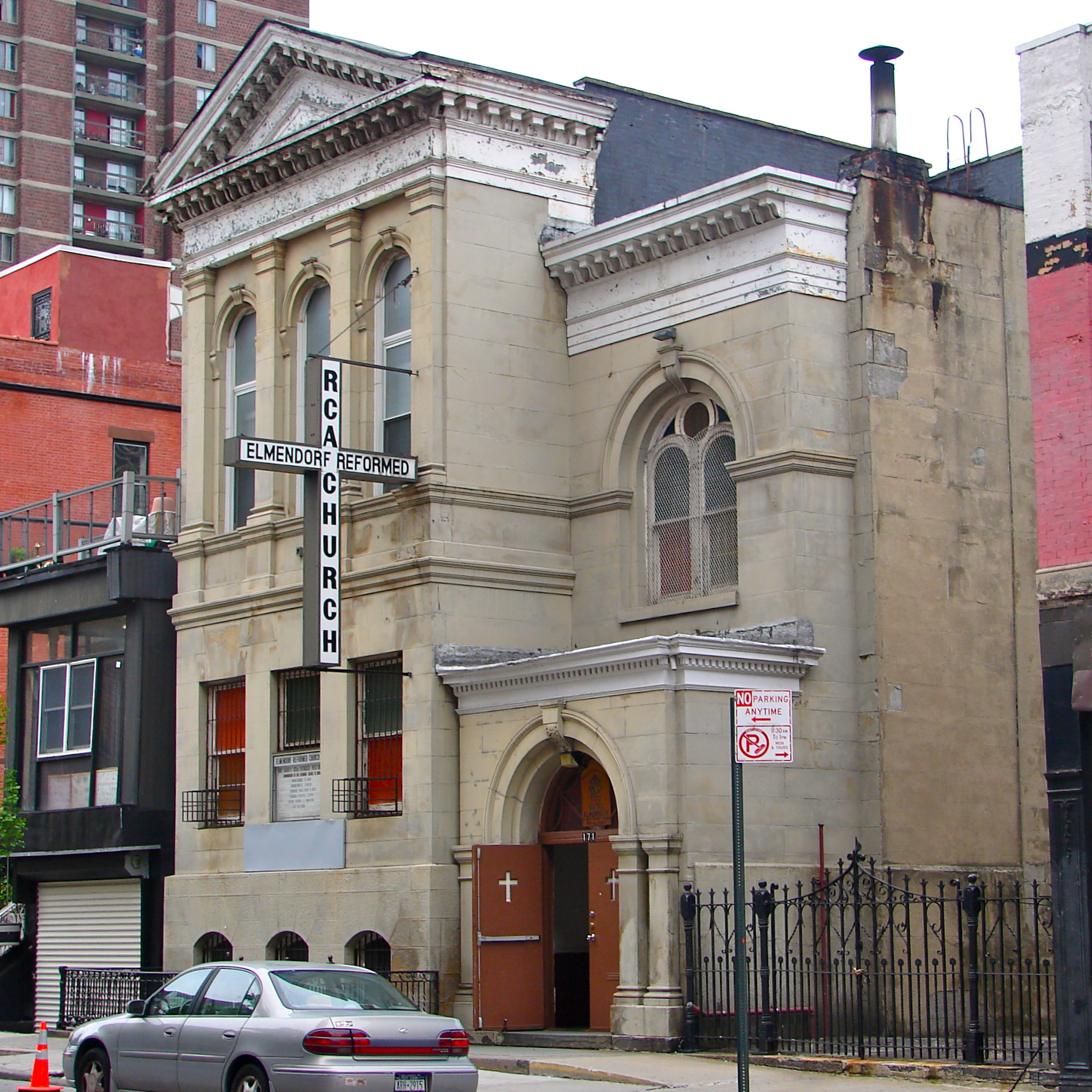
Elmendorf Reformed Church, the successor of the Low Dutch Reformed Church of Harlem

The Harlem African Burial Ground was a segregated cemetery created in 1668 for the burial of enslaved and freed Africans in the Dutch colony of Harlem. It is located at what is presently 2460 Second Avenue in the East Harlem neighborhood of Manhattan in New York City. It was maintained until 1858 by the Elmendorf Reformed Church, the successor of the Low Dutch Reformed Church of Harlem which founded the cemetery. Although historians of New York and Harlem, as well as church historians, were aware of the cemetery's existence, the East Harlem community was largely unaware of its history until the late 1990s when the New York City Department of Transportation (DOT) began planning the reconstruction of the nearby Willis Avenue Bridge. The investigation revealed that the construction might affect a colonial site and historic burial ground which was under the decommissioned East 126th Street Bus Depot. Per New York State law, the DOT conducted a Phase I-A historical and archeological survey, which verified the existence of the burial ground.

== History ==
In 1658, the Dutch governor Peter Stuyvesant ordered enslaved Africans to construct a road from the Dutch colony in Lower Manhattan to the colony of Nieuw Haarlem. The Dutch colonizers of Nieuw Haarlem raised funds to build a Reformed Dutch church at what would become 1st Avenue between 126th and 127th Street in 1665. In 1667, a quarter-acre plot of land north of the church became the colony's first official burial ground. In 1686, the church relocated to a new building to the south of the original church and established a new cemetery at the site; the original burial ground would become known as the Negro Burying Ground, presently called the Harlem African Burial Ground.

The Low Dutch Reformed Church of Harlem maintained these segregated cemeteries for white parishioners and parishioners of African descent. The church moved a few blocks from its original site in the mid-19th century and sold the African burial grounds to a parishioner who used the land for grazing livestock. The Low Dutch Church eventually sold the site in 1853, allowing for the re-division of the land, including the burial grounds, into private parcels that would become City Block 1803. After contacting descendants for permission, the remains of the white parishioners were disinterred and reburied in Woodlawn Cemetery in the Bronx; the remains of the African parishioners were left behind. The land was subsequently used for a variety of purposes including an amusement park, a beer garden, barracks for a National Guard infantry unit, and a film studio owned by William Randolph Hearst. The building was bought by the Third Avenue Railway Company for its streetcars and later buses, which was then acquired by the city.

== Harlem African Burial Ground Task Force ==
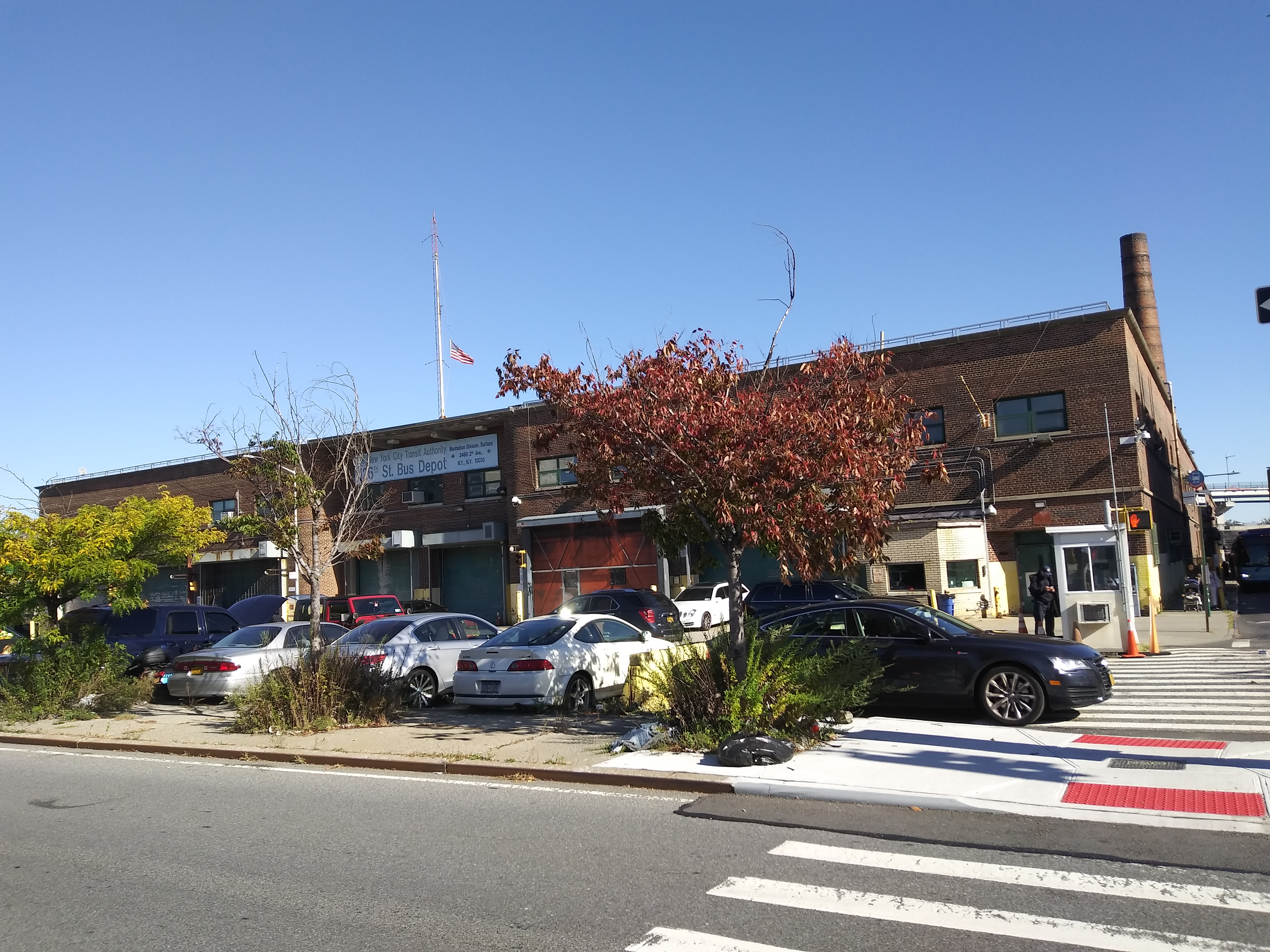
The 126th St NYCTA Bus Depot, on the site of the Burial Ground, in 2021

Many Harlem community leaders, historians, and advocates insisted that there was an unidentified African burial ground somewhere in East Harlem. The Harlem African Burial Ground Task Force was founded in 2009 in conjunction with Elmendorf Reformed Church to memorialize and preserve the burial ground, although the precise location was at that point unknown. The reverend of Elmendorf Reformed Church, Dr. Patricia A. Singletary, has served as co-chair with former New York City Council Speaker Melissa Mark-Viverito since the task force's inception. In 2011, a group of students from Hunter College's Urban Planning Studio submitted a report to the task force about memoralization options of the site and recommended archeological assessment. In 2015, the New York City Economic Development Corporation hired the consulting firm AKRF, Inc to conduct a Phase I-B archeological assessment under the former bus depot. More than 140 bone and bone fragments were found, including a skull believed to be from an adult woman of African descent.

The remains identified at the former burial ground were re-consecrated in a ceremony conducted by Dr. Singletary and are currently held in storage in the archives of the New York City Landmarks Preservation Commission awaiting re-interment at the future memorial.

On January 29, 2018, the site was added to the National Register of Historic Places.

== Memorial and development ==
The New York City Council approved the redevelopment of the former bus depot into a mixed-use development with a memorial for the original burial site in 2017. The approval prohibited any development on the location of the original burial ground, which is reserved for the memorial. The rest of the block will be developed into a cultural center for the residents of East Harlem and affordable housing for low-income residents. The project was delayed due to the COVID-19 pandemic. In 2022, the MTA announced its plans to finish vacating the block, with a timeline of beginning the planning-design phase in 2023, contingent on funding.
