= Community Alliance for Jewish-affiliated Cemeteries =

US nonprofit organization

- Founded: September 22, 2006; 19 years ago
- Tax ID no.: 56-2649778
- Legal status: 501(c)(3) nonprofit organization
- Headquarters: White Plains, New York
- Executive Director, Chief Financial Officer: Andrew Schultz
- President: Gary Katz
- Revenue: $144,429 (2013)
- Expenses: $130,926 (2013)
- Website: cajacnynj.org
- Formerly called: Friends of Bayside Cemetery, Community Association for Jewish At-risk Cemeteries

Community Alliance for Jewish-affiliated Cemeteries (CAJAC) is a nonprofit organization established to rescue and maintain Jewish cemeteries. CAJAC's mission is to be a central repository for fundraising, endowment management and the general care of abandoned and at-risk Jewish cemeteries.

== History ==
The organization was incorporated as Friends of Bayside Cemetery on September 22, 2006. It officially changed its name to Community Association for Jewish At-risk Cemeteries on April 13, 2007. The organization officially changed its name again to Community Alliance for Jewish-affiliated Cemeteries on August 11, 2014.

== Bayside Cemetery restoration ==
Starting with seed money from the UJA Federation of New York, CAJAC has begun a massive restoration and maintenance program at Bayside Cemetery in Queens, New York. CAJAC has employed a private contractor and instituted a volunteer program to clear the entire cemetery.
