= New Bethel Way of the Cross Church of Christ =

Historic synagogue in Manhattan, New York

- Congregation Shaare Zedek of Harlem
- U.S. National Register of Historic Places
- New York State Register of Historic Places
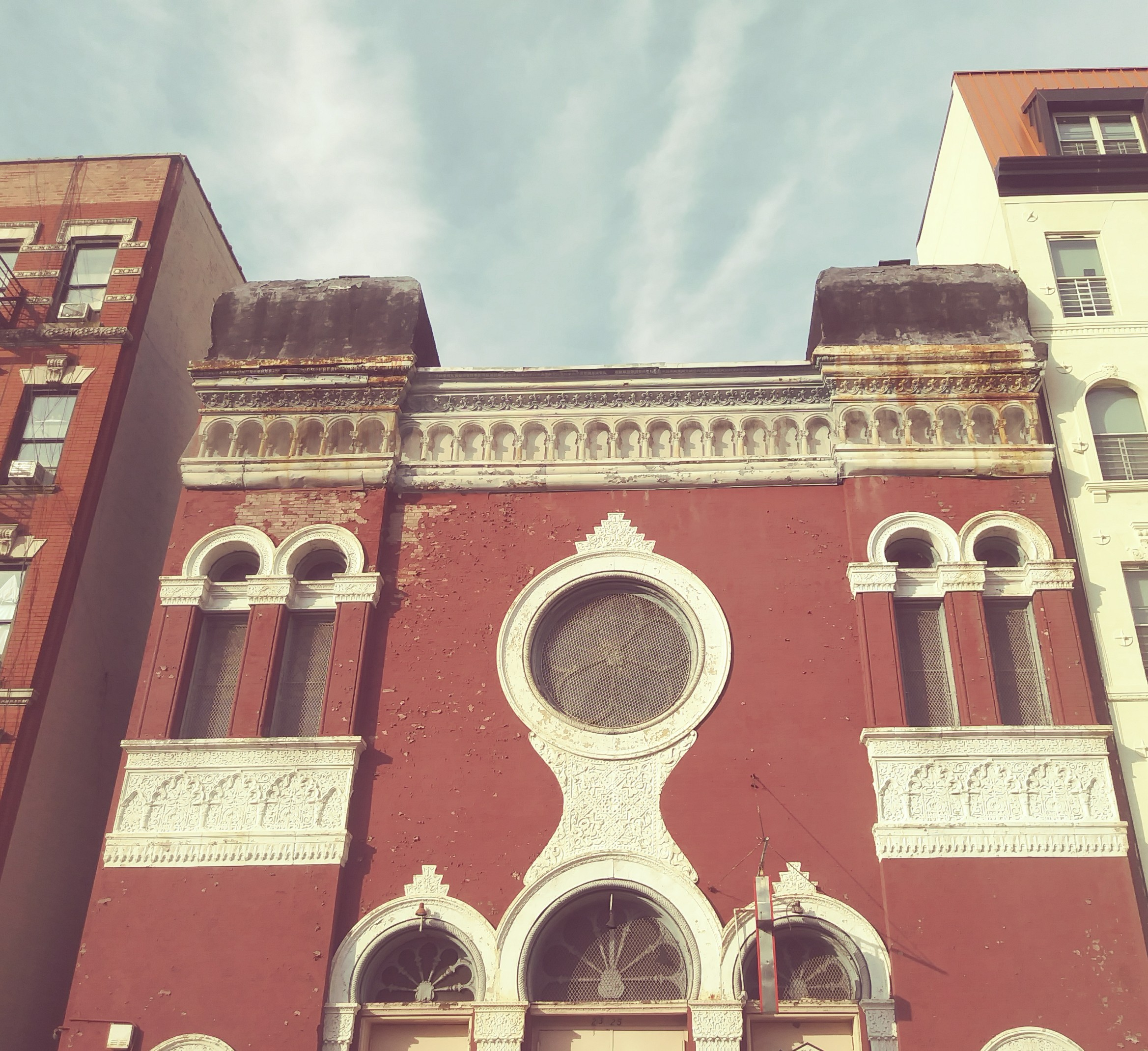

- Location within Manhattan Location within New York City Location within New York Location within the United States
- Location: 23 W. 118th St., Manhattan, New York, US
- Coordinates: 40°48′10″N 73°56′48″W
- Area: 0.1 acres (0.040 ha)
- Architect: Michael Bernstein
- Architectural style: Moorish Revival
- NRHP reference No.: 15000031
- NYSRHP No.: 06101.018954

Significant dates
- Added to NRHP: February 23, 2015
- Designated NYSRHP: December 23, 2014

New Bethel Way of the Cross Church of Christ (originally Congregation Shaare Zedek of Harlem) is a historic church and former synagogue at 23–25 West 118th Street in the Harlem neighborhood of Manhattan in New York City, United States. Designed by Michael Bernstein in the Moorish Revival style, it occupies a site of 50 by 100 feet (15 by 30 m). The building has a brick facade, terracotta trim, and an asphalt roof. The main elevation of the facade, to the south, has several entrance archways and a circular rose window in the center, as well as twin towers crowned with bulbous, copper-covered domes. Inside, an entrance vestibule leads to a sanctuary with balcony. Stairs lead up to the balcony and down to auxiliary spaces in the basement, and there are a pastor's study and deacon's quarters flanking the sanctuary.

The building was developed by Shaare Zedek, a Conservative Jewish congregation that originally met on the Lower East Side before splitting into two congregations in the late 1890s. The subsidiary congregation bought land in 1899 and completed the synagogue in 1901. The main congregation remained on the Lower East Side until 1914, when it merged with the Harlem congregation; it moved out in 1921. The building was then used by another congregation, Chevra Talmud Torah Dagustow, and subsequently by Canaan Baptist Church from 1935 to 1966. Since 1966, it has been used by the Bethel Way of the Cross Church of Christ. It is listed on the National Register of Historic Places.

== Description ==
Congregation Shaare Zedek's former Harlem synagogue (now New Bethel Way of the Cross Church of Christ) is at 23–25 West 118th Street (Note: The address number is sometimes given as 23 or 25.) in the Harlem neighborhood of Manhattan in New York City, United States. The New Bethel Way building is a two-story Moorish Revival structure designed by Michael Bernstein. The site measures approximately 50 by 100 feet (15 by 30 m) across. The building occupies the full site; there is an alley immediately to the east and a tenement apartment building to the west. Its basilica-like rectangular floor plan is consistent with the design of other Moorish Revival synagogues, and the interior includes moldings, capitals, and doorways with Moorish arches.

=== Exterior ===
The structure has a brick facade, terracotta trim, and an asphalt roof. The main elevation of the facade, facing the street to the south, has a symmetrical massing with symmetrical stair towers that rise above a wider central pavilion. There is a fence surrounding an areaway in front of the entrance. The towers are crowned with bulbous, copper-covered domes, which were ornamented with finials bearing motifs of the Star of David.

On the main or southern elevation, the central pavilion has three archways with Moorish-style keyhole arches, which are separated by brick pilasters topped by foliate capitals; the arches themselves have doors topped by semicircular painted transom windows. The central arch has a double door, and above it is a hourglass-shaped terracotta trim panel connecting it with a large circular rose window directly above; the arches flanking it have one door each. The stair towers also have keyhole archways, which have one door each, flanked and surrounded by terracotta trim. Above the stair-tower entrances are terracotta trim bands, as well as pairs of lancet windows at the same level as the rose window. An ornate, carved cornice made of sheet metal runs horizontally across the entire facade above these windows.

Adjacent to the alley, the facade's western elevation is covered in gray stucco, and an alleyway leads to a security gate from the street. There are window and door openings (some blocked up or barred over) in the basement, while the first and second stories have numerous stained glass windows. The north elevation of the facade is finished in white-painted stucco over brick. It has a metal fire-escape platform where a stair descends to a door and two windows in the basement. At the first story, the north elevation has a door to the east, and a stained-glass window to the west, overlooking an enclosed rear yard. The yard itself has a gable-roofed shelter connecting with the alley.

=== Interior ===
The entrance vestibule is accessed from the southern elevation's three central doorways and has a tiled black and white floor. The walls have plaster decorations, marble wainscoting, red-painted doorways, and pilasters. The ceiling has a raised central portion with elaborate trim and a hanging lamp. The north wall has three doorways to the sanctuary, directly opposite the southern elevation's doorways. The west and east walls have stairs with wooden balustrades and Star of David newels, connecting with the basement and the sanctuary's balcony.

Above the first floor, the stairs have wooden treads, marble wainscoting, cream-colored walls above the wainscoting, and lighting sconces. At the second floor, the stairs also have stained glass windows, along with doors leading to the balcony. Below the first floor, the stairs have terrazzo treads, wainscoting with red moldings, and wallpaper above.

At the front, or north, end of the sanctuary is the chancel (formerly a bimah); it is slightly raised and has a curved wooden front with a brass rail. Located behind the chancel is a niche with a decorative round arch, which originally housed the Torah ark; above it are painted motifs and scrollwork. At the main level of the sanctuary, there are 16 rows of pews facing the chancel, separated by red-carpeted aisles; the rest of the floor surface is made of tile. The walls have red dado rails topped by white plaster walls with stained-glass windows. The ceiling is a barrel vault and has a pair of round skylights with stained glass. There is a balcony on the rear and sides of the room, supported by metal columns with twisting lower sections and Moorish capitals. The balcony has wood flooring and carved wooden pews. The curved balcony front is painted white and has a stamped metal surface with quatrefoil and floral motifs, a gold-painted central molding band, and a wooden cross. The balcony has red dado rails topped by beige plaster walls with stained-glass windows. The rear section of the balcony has a central hanging clock, a space behind the southern elevation's rose window, and a door leading to a ladder to the roof. The balcony's side sections have keyhole-shaped archways, which are emergency exits leading to the fire escape on the north elevation.

At the north end of the ground floor are two rooms flanking the chancel; the western room is the pastor's study, and the eastern room is the deacons' quarters. Both have wood grain paneling, tiled floors, dropped ceilings, and windows (now sealed), and the eastern room also has an emergency exit. In the basement are men's and women's restrooms along with utility–janitorial closets. A hallway runs north of the western staircase to a central kitchen and several other rooms. The kitchen has a cooking area with a terracotta tile floor and white tile walls, and an outer area with stamped-metal ceiling and built-in wooden benches; the cooking and outer areas are separated by a partition. Other spaces in the basement include a Sunday school room, a secretary's office, a youth room, and an L-shaped room used as a junior church and a dining room. These rooms' architectural features include wooden doors, tiled floors, sealed-off windows, and metal columns.

== History ==
=== Synagogue use ===
Many synagogues served Harlem in the late 19th and early 20th centuries, when the neighborhood was inhabited by over 100,000 Jews. Harlem's Jewish community, originating after the American Civil War in the 1860s, was populated by Jews who relocated from more southerly parts of Manhattan. Encouraged by the construction of elevated railways to Harlem, the neighborhood's Jewish population became one of the largest in the United States. One of Harlem's synagogues at the peak of the neighborhood's Jewish community was Congregation Shaare Zedek (also spelled Chaari Zedek), a Conservative Jewish congregation, which was founded in Lower Manhattan in 1837. After several relocations, Shaare Zedek took over the property of Ansche Chesed, another Jewish congregation in Lower Manhattan, on Henry Street by 1853. Shaare Zedek originally had a mikveh, or ritual bath, but eliminated it in 1891 as part of a broader late-19th-century shift away from Orthodox traditions.

By 1897, Shaare Zedek's members debated whether to stay in the Henry Street building, or move to Harlem where an increasing number of congregants were settling. A splinter congregation, the Congregation Shaare Zedek of Harlem, split from the Congregation Shaare Zedek of Henry Street that year. After receiving $6,000, the breakaway group purchased three 25-foot-wide (7.6 m) lots on 118th Street in Central Harlem in July 1899, obtaining a site measuring 75 by 100 feet (23 by 30 m) across. Initial architectural plans were drawn up by Schneider & Herter, with a budget of $65,000, and were submitted to the city government in May 1900. The congregation ultimately hired architect Michael Bernstein to build a smaller structure for $50,000, and sold off the westernmost lot. The new synagogue was completed in September 1900, for the High Holy Days, and the Congregation Shaare Zedek of Harlem hired a new rabbi from the synagogue on Henry Street. The new synagogue had mixed-gender seating and fewer Orthodox services compared with the Henry Street congregation.

Congregants on Henry Street continued to move uptown, prompting the older congregation to sell its building by 1911. After occupying several locations, the Henry Street congregation merged in 1914 with the Harlem congregation, which consequently began hosting more Orthodox services. Congregants were already moving from Harlem to the Upper West Side by the 1910s, prompting the congregation to buy a new site on the Upper West Side in 1921; at the time, Jews were relocating from Harlem due to economic and real-estate pressures. The new building was dedicated on April 15, 1923, and the congregation moved out, selling its Harlem building that June to another congregation, Chevra Talmud Torah Dagustow (also spelled Chevra Talmud Torah D'Auguston or Angustower). Little is known of Chevra Talmud Torah Dagustow.

=== Church use ===
In 1935, the former Shaare Zedek building on 118th Street was sold to the Canaan Baptist Church, which also acquired two mortgage loans that had been placed on the building. Canaan Baptist, a Black church founded three years prior, had previously occupied a site on 134th Street. The congregation acquired an adjacent building at 21 West 118th Street in 1948. Canaan Baptist Church began erecting a new building at 642–650 Saint Nicholas Avenue in 1959, and the congregation moved out of the old building in 1966.

Afterward, the Shaare Zedek of Harlem building was occupied by New Bethel Way of the Cross Church of Christ, which moved in that year. New Bethel Way had previously occupied a building on nearby Adam Clayton Powell Jr. Boulevard but had found its existing building insufficient. The New Bethel Way building was added to the National Register of Historic Places in 2015.

== See also ==
- National Register of Historic Places listings in Manhattan above 110th Street
