= Marta Moreno Vega =

Author, professor, arts administrator (born 1942)

- Born: January 3, 1942 (age 84); East Harlem, New York, U.S.
- Occupations: Founder, CCCADI
- Years active: 1969–present

Marta Moreno Vega (born 1942) is the founder of the Caribbean Culture Center African Diaspora Institute (CCCADI). She led El Museo del Barrio, is one of the founders of the Association of Hispanic Arts, and founded the Network of Centers of Color and the Roundtable of Institutions of Colors. Vega is also a visual artist and an Afro-Latina activist.

== Early life and education ==
Vega was born in the East Harlem neighborhood of New York City. Her family is of Yoruba origin and she describes herself as Afro-Puerto Rican. Her parents were born in Puerto Rico: her mother in Caguas and her father in Loiza, Puerto Rico.

She received her B.A. and M.A. degrees in education from New York University and in 1995 received a PhD in African Studies from Temple University.

== Career ==
Vega began her academic career in education obtaining a Bachelor's and a master's degree in education from New York University. She started by teaching history and arts-in-education to junior high and high schools around New York City.

In the spring of 1971, Vega was voted in as the second Director of El Museo del Barrio. As Director, she continued the founder's, Rafael Montañez Ortiz, work in educating the community about the need to support a museum depicting their history. In June 1974, she curated an exhibition documenting slavery and Afro-Puerto Rican heritage called Aspectos de la esclavitud en Puerto Rico. She served as director until March 1975.

She was one of the founders of the Association of Hispanic Arts (AHA), which was created in 1975. AHA is a nonprofit organization dedicated to promoting the work of Hispanic artists.

In 1976, she founded and became the Director of the Caribbean Cultural Center African Diaspora Institute (CCCADI) in New York City. The CCCADI is an international nonprofit dedicated to maintaining the history and traditions of the African diaspora in the Americas and promoting social activism, among other things. Vega was inspired to create the CCCADI after realizing that there was limited information about the African and Native cultures from the Caribbean and Latin American countries. In January 2018, Vega became an advisor to the Board of Directors, with Margarita Rosa, Esq. present as the role of interim director of CCCADI.

From 1996 to 2000, she was an assistant professor at Baruch College of City University of New York in the Black and Hispanic Studies department. She began this position after earning her doctorate in African Studies from Temple University the year prior.

In 2000, Vega served as co-director of the Global Afro-Latino and Caribbean Initiative(GALCI) at Hunter College. The program promoted to make known the struggles of the Afro-Latino communities, which are less visible, and insisting that the human, civil, and cultural rights of these communities be respected and acknowledged. The program was terminated years later. That same year, she wrote her first book, The Altar of My Soul: The Living Traditions of Santeria. The book dives into the Santeria religion, detailing its origin, themes, and practices while connecting them to Vega's experiences both from her childhood, where she has seen her grandmother practice the religion and as an adult practicing it herself. In 2004, a few years later, Vega published a personal memoir based on the documentary, When the Spirits Dance Mambo: Growing Up Nuyorican in El Barrio. It covers the range of issues such as the influence of African culture in South America, Afro-Caribbean-American identity in the Latin community, and the religious aspects of the Santeria religion. She discusses the experience of living in Spanish Harlem, delving into her life as a woman of color. Her book, When the Spirits Dance Mambo, was reprinted and released in April 2018.

In addition to Dr.Vega being a Yoruba Priestess, she is also a lead researcher in the culture and religion. Vega has been a professor at many universities throughout America during her career after the GALCI program at Hunter College. Vega has taught at El Centro de Estudios Avanzados Puertorriquenos de Puerto Rico y El Caribe in San Juan, Puerto Rico, was an adjunct professor at the Interamerican University of Puerto Rico, and an adjunct professor in New York University's Department of Arts and Public Policy.

Vega founded the program, Creative Justice Initiative, whose focus is to allow a fluid creative process of gathering thought makers essentially to create thoughtful and intentional change.

In 2011 Vega was one of five New Yorkers featured in the HBO documentary by Timothy Greenfield-Sanders called The Latino List. In 2012, Vega gave a talk at the TEDxHarlem detailing Afro-Latino spirituality in Puerto Rican and other Caribbean cultures. In April 2013, Dr. Vega launched a campaign to raise funds to create Let the Spirit Move You: The Documentary. The campaign was completely funded by in total a month later. It focused on Santeria, the African diaspora, and the importance of community. Dr. Moreno-Vega has been referenced in Edgardo Miranda-Rodriguez's Guardians of Infinity #3. The comic features Groot as having a Puerto Rican background. In it, Dr. Moreno-Vega's personage is caricatured by a character named Abuela Estela. When asked about this similarity, Miranda-Rodriguez stated "I've known Marta since I was about 19. She has always supported me as a young professional... That's why I made her the abuela. The [idea] literally came from her mouth." In 2018, Vega was featured in the Brooklyn Museum's exhibit, Radical Women: Latin American Art, 1960–1985.

== Honored ==
- Barnard College, Distinguished Visiting Gildersleeve Professor
- Association of American Cultures, Crystal Stairs Award
- Multicultural Council of New York City, Mosaic Award

== Personal life ==
She has two children: Sergio and Omar Vega. Although she grew up in Catholic religion, she rejected that religion and now practices Santería.

== Works and publications ==
- Vega, Marta Moreno (2000). The Altar of My Soul: The Living Traditions of Santería (1st ed.). New York: One World. ISBN 978-0-307-56710-9. OCLC 948132659.
- Vega, Marta Moreno (2004). When the Spirits Dance Mambo: Growing Up Nuyorican in El Barrio (1st ed.). New York: Three Rivers Press. ISBN 978-0-307-54921-1. OCLC 682188980.
- Vega, Marta Moreno; Manjon, Sonia (2014). A Snapshot-Landmarking Community Cultural Arts Organizations Nationally: The Impact of Public Policy on Community Arts Funding (1st ed.). California: CreateSpace Independent Publishing Platform. ISBN 978-1-494-47422-5.
