= Bayside Cemetery =

Jewish cemetery in Queens, New York

- Interactive map of Bayside Cemetery

Details
- Established: 1865
- Location: 80-35 Pitkin Avenue, Ozone Park, Queens, New York City
- Country: United States
- Coordinates: 40°40′42″N 73°51′21″W
- Type: Jewish
- Owned by: Congregation Shaare Zedek
- Size: 12 acres (49,000 m^{2})
- No. of graves: 35,000
- The Political Graveyard: Bayside Cemetery

Bayside Cemetery is a Jewish cemetery at 80-35 Pitkin Avenue in Ozone Park, Queens, New York City, United States. It covers about 12 acres (4.9 ha) and has about 35,000 interments. It is bordered on the east by Acacia Cemetery, on the north by Liberty Avenue, on the west by Mokom Sholom Cemetery, and on the south by Pitkin Avenue.

Bayside was established by Congregation Shaare Zedek when the latter was an Orthodox Jewish synagogue on the Lower East Side of Manhattan. Shaare Zedek still owns Bayside Cemetery and is currently a Conservative synagogue on Manhattan's Upper West Side, about 10 miles (16 km) away. The cemetery is reachable via the New York City Subway's IND Fulton Street Line (A train) to the 80th Street or 88th Street stations.

== History ==
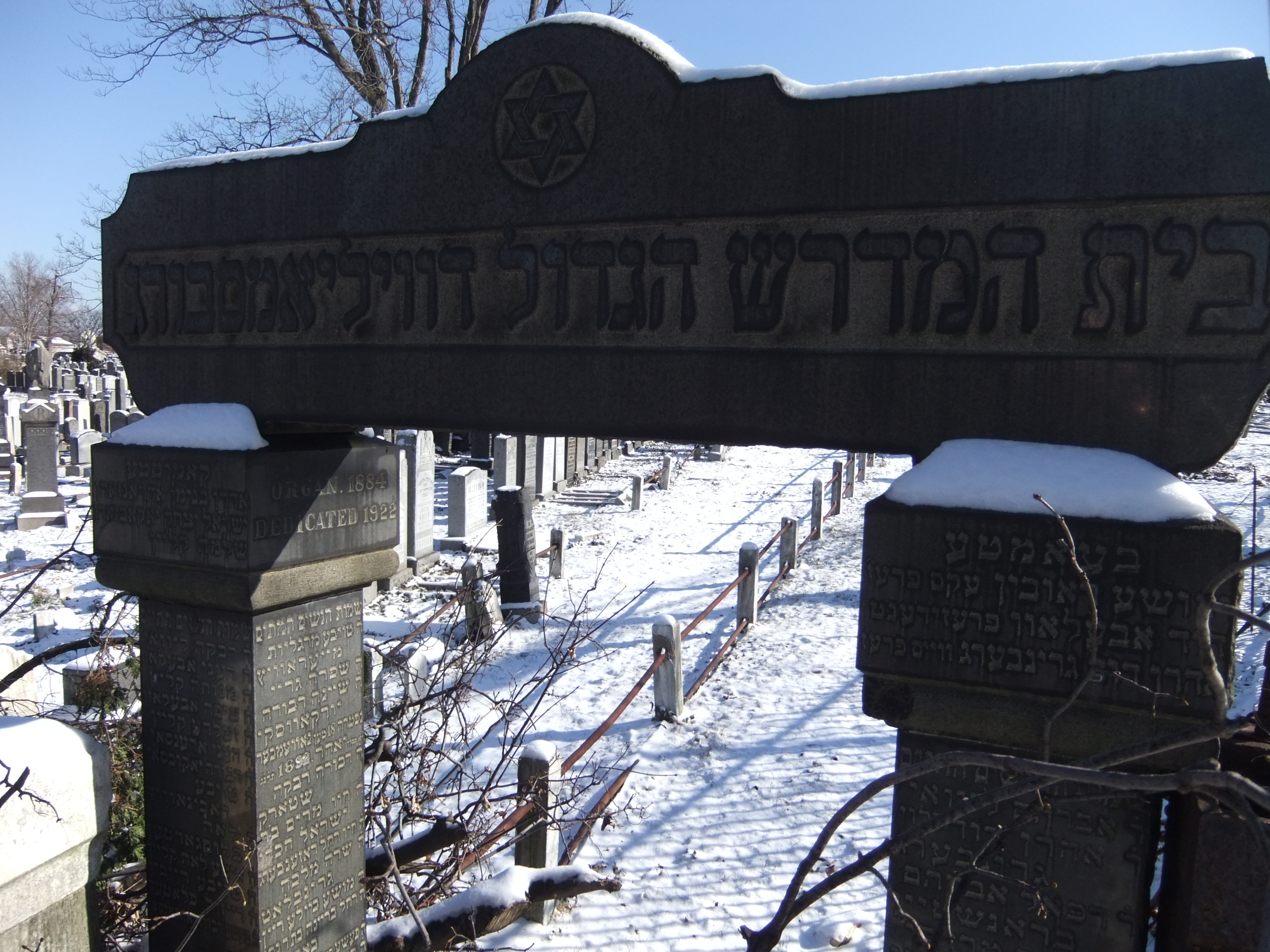
A gateway in Acacia Cemetery erected by a synagogue located in Williamsburg, Brooklyn

Bayside was founded in 1865, making it one of the oldest Jewish cemeteries in New York City that is still active. Among those buried there are military veterans from the Civil War and a victim of the sinking of the Titanic – George Rosenshine.

== Decline ==
For several decades starting in the mid-20th century, Bayside Cemetery fell into extensive disrepair, through both numerous episodes of vandalism and steady neglect. During a portion of this time, by the 1980s, its owner Shaare Zedek was "essentially defunct," with no rabbi and irregular services.

A volunteer cleanup was organized in 2003, but it lasted only four days, and did not result in the sustained effort that was needed to cut and substantially remove the decades of overgrowth of trees, bushes, vines, and other vegetation. Shaare Zedek did not participate.

A lawsuit was initiated in 2007 attempting to force Shaare Zedek to assume responsibility for the poor condition of Bayside, and claimed that Shaare Zedek used funds that were given for perpetual care of graves at Bayside for other purposes, such repairing the roof of the synagogue. In a newspaper interview, a lawyer for Shaare Zedek claimed that the synagogue was not responsible for maintaining the cemetery and that it did not own 90% of it. The lawsuit was dismissed for lack of standing in 2017.

== Restoration ==
During the past several years, CAJAC, The Community Association for Jewish At-Risk Cemeteries, coordinated a major project to restore and maintain Bayside Cemetery. CAJAC was established as a non-profit organization to rescue and maintain Jewish cemeteries, and hired MC Landscaping to perform the major cleanup at Bayside. Volunteers have complemented the professional efforts. The initial cleanup was set to be completed by November 2009, but took substantially longer than expected and was finished in 2012. Since then, Anthony Pisciotta has volunteered his equipment, time, and skills to repair and seal many of the damaged mausoleums and reset many of the downed grave markers.

In 2017, Shaare Zedek entered into a real estate deal to sell its synagogue building to a developer with a plan to build condominiums and a smaller synagogue on the site, and use some of the money toward restoration and upkeep of the cemetery, but as of June 2018, the cemetery has not seen any participation by the synagogue, with no allocation of money or hiring of anybody to do any of the cleanup work. Shaare Zedek has even prevented Pisciotta from doing his own further cleanup work at the cemetery, for unclear reasons.

== Notable burials ==
- William Karlin (1882–1944), New York State Assemblyman
- Frances Lewine (1921–2008), journalist and White House correspondent
- George Rosenshine (1866–1912), perished on the Titanic
- Charles Tobias (1897–1970), songwriter and lyricist
- Lester Volk (1884–1962), U.S. Congressman
- Harry Wolff (1890–1934), vaudeville booking agent
