= Harry Wolff (booking agent) =

Booking agent

Harry Wolff (1890 – August 21, 1934), known professionally in the theater business as Harry Lorraine, was a booking agent for theater and vaudeville performers in the early 20th century.

Wolff was born in Manhattan during 1890. He spent most of his professional career working for the firm Fally and Marcus as a booking agent for vaudeville entertainers, before creating his own agency in 1931. He was noted for supplying talent for dinners of the New York City Police Department and their department associations. He lived in Astoria, Queens, and died at his home unexpectedly, on August 21, 1934. He was buried in Bayside Cemetery in Ozone Park, Queens.

An American film actor whose career overlapped also used the name Harry Lorraine, and there was also a British film actor named Harry Lorraine who appeared in some American films.
