= Elmendorf Reformed Church =

Church in Manhattan, New York

- U.S. National Register of Historic Places
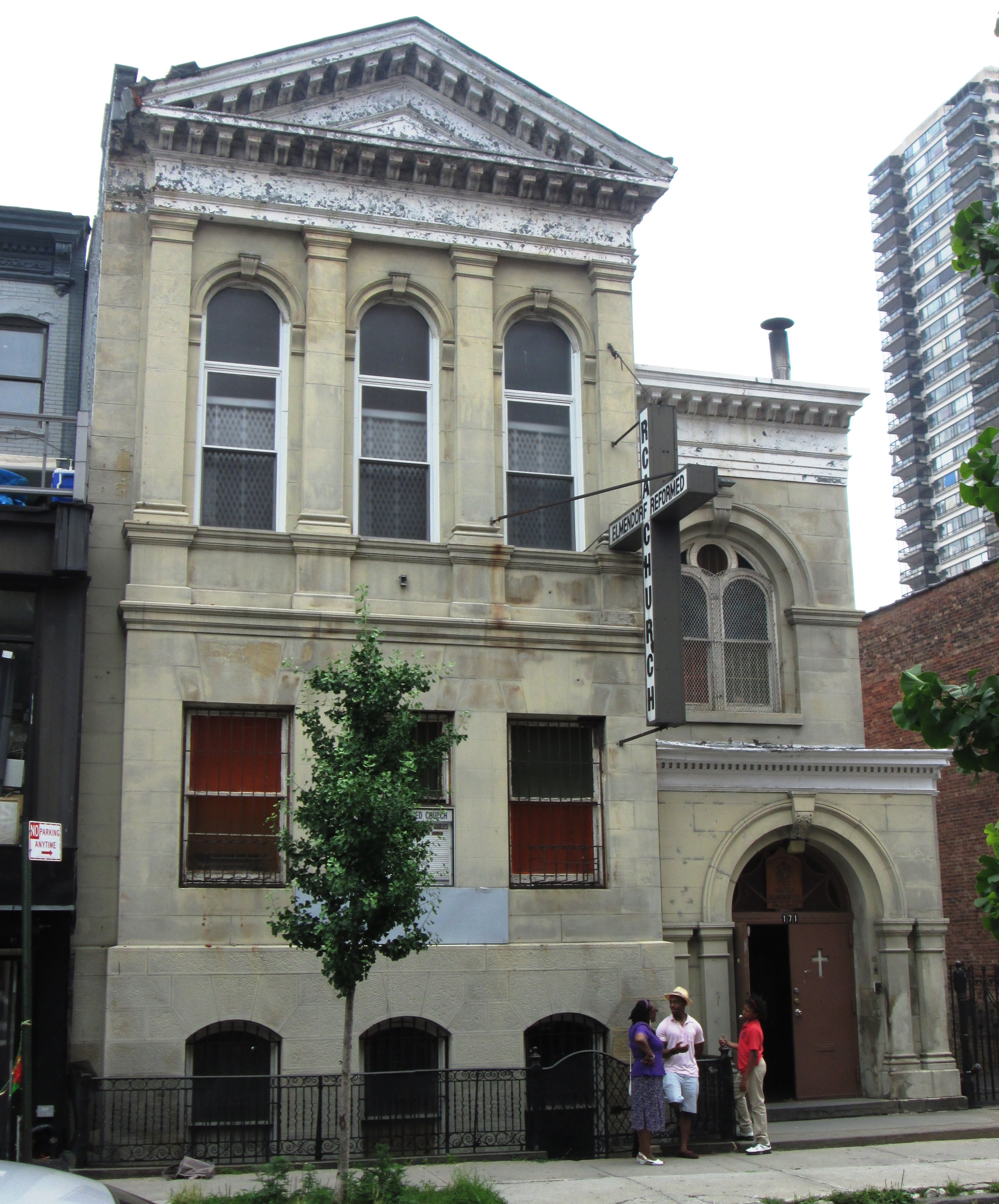
- (2013)

- Location within New York City Location within New York Location within the United States
- Location: 171 E. 121st St. Manhattan, New York City
- Coordinates: 40°48′5.5″N 73°56′18″W
- Built: 1893-94
- Architect: Joseph Ireland
- Architectural style: Classical
- NRHP reference No.: 10000225
- Added to NRHP: April 27, 2010

The Elmendorf Reformed Church, formerly known as the Elmendorf Chapel, is a historic Reformed Church in America (RCA) church located at 171 East 121st Street between Sylvan Court and Third Avenue in the Harlem neighborhood of Manhattan, New York City. It was founded as a parish house and Sunday school for the First Collegiate Church of Harlem, which had its beginnings in 1660 as the Low Dutch Reformed Church of Harlem or Harlem Reformed Dutch Church, the first house of worship in Harlem. The Church's original burying ground for its African American congregants was discovered in 2008 at the 126th Street Depot of the MTA Regional Bus Operations when body parts were found upon digging at the location. The Metropolitan Transportation Authority agreed to move the Depot by 2015. Sanctuaries were built in 1665–67, 1686–87, 1825 and 1897, at various locations in the area. In 1893-94 a Neoclassical parish house was built on this site under the auspices of Rev. Joachim Elmendorf, designed by Joseph Ireland. Around 1910, the church at the time was torn down, and the parish house was rebuilt as the Elmendorf Chapel, which then became the Elmendorf Reformed Church. It is the oldest congregation in Harlem.

The church is a two-story plus basement building which is "L" shaped in plan and fills much of its 53 feet wide by 120 feet deep lot.

The church was listed on the National Register of Historic Places in 2010.

On September 22, 2002, Patricia A. Singletary became the first female minister of the Elmendorf Reformed Church.

The Elmendorf Reformed Church was organized in 1660 as the Harlem Reformed Low Dutch Church[5][6][7]
