= Caribbean Cultural Center African Diaspora Institute =

American non-profit organization

Coordinates: 40°48′16″N 73°56′17.4″W

The Caribbean Cultural Center African Diaspora Institute (CCCADI) is a nonprofit organization based in East Harlem, New York City, that serves as an Afro-Caribbean center of culture and community for members of the African Diaspora.

== History ==
The Caribbean Cultural Center African Diaspora Institute (CCCADI) was founded in 1976 by Dr. Marta Moreno Vega.

In January 2018, Vega became an advisor to the Board of Directors, with Margarita Rosa taking on the role of interim director of CCCADI while the search for a new executive director was taking place. In 2018, Melody Capote was named Executive Director, a role she continues to hold today.

== Facilities ==
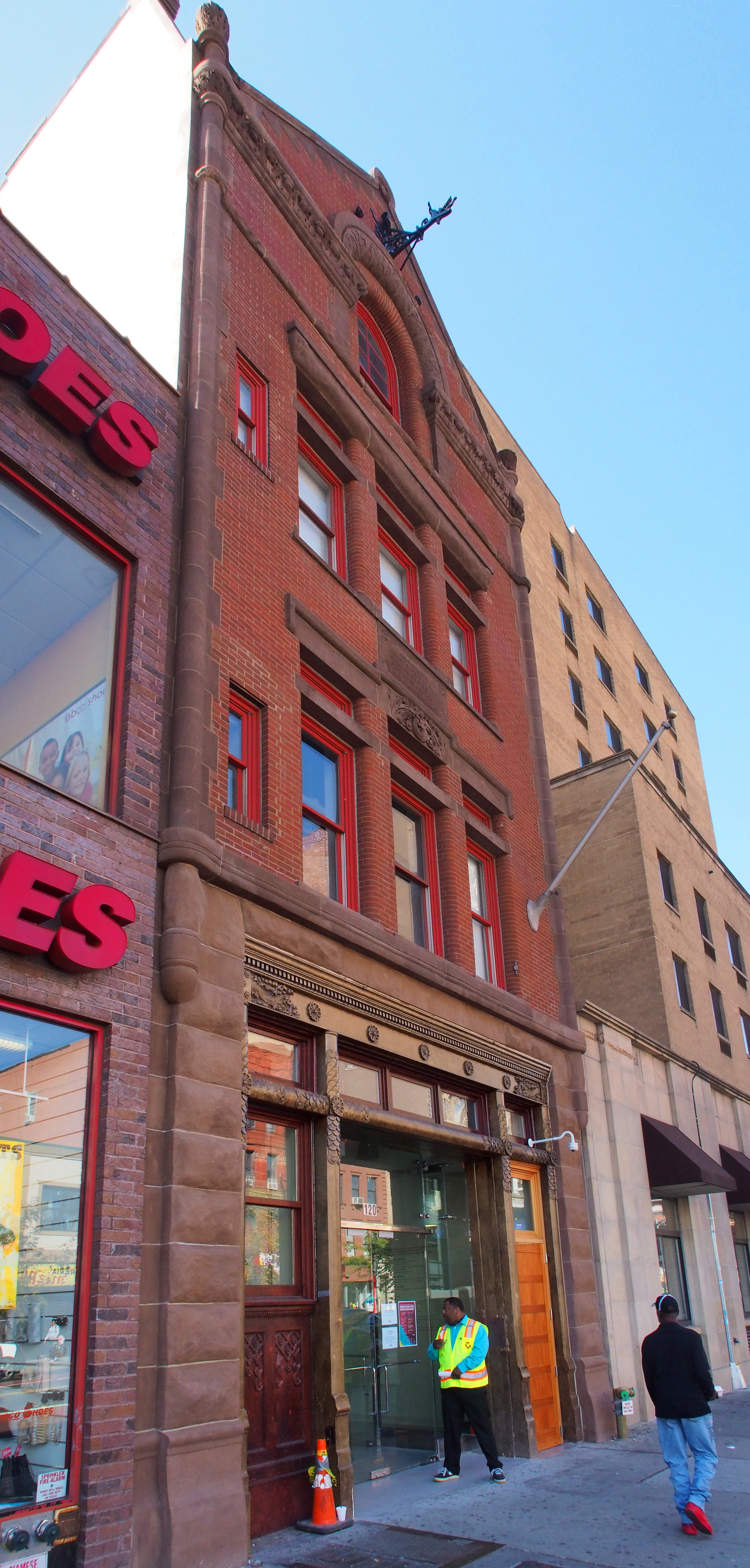
OHNY Caribbean Cultural Center African Diaspora Institute at Firehouse, Hook & Ladder Company 14, on 125th Street in New York City

CCCADI is currently located in Firehouse, Hook & Ladder Company 14, a decommissioned fire house on 125th Street near Park Avenue in East Harlem, New York City, listed on the National Register of Historic Places. The center opened its new premises in October 2016.

Previously, the Center was in the Hell's Kitchen neighborhood of Manhattan on West 58th Street. In 2025, CCCADI inaugurated an annex location two blocks away from the CCCADI Firehouse. CCCADI Ilé Oyin, Yoruba for “House of Honey,” is a vibrant cultural sanctuary designed to uplift Harlem’s creative community.

== Exhibitions ==
In addition to art exhibitions, the center also schedules regular lectures and concerts related to the Caribbean and African cultures.

Exhibits include the following:

- 2013: Saving our Soul: From the Big Easy to the Big Apple
- 2016: Home, Memory, and Future
- 2018: Defend Puerto Rico

== Publications ==
- Caribbean Cultural Center (New York, N.Y.). Under One Sun: News and Events of the Caribbean Cultural Center. New York, NY: The Center. OCLC 14369115.
- Beauchamp-Byrd, Mora J.; Sirmans, M. Franklin, eds. (1997). The Caribbean Cultural Centre Presents: Transforming the Crown : African, Asian and Caribbean Artists in Britain, 1966-1996. New York: Franklin H. Williams Caribbean Cultural Centre: African Diaspora Institute. ISBN 978-0-96-540820-2.
