= P.S. 186 =

Historic school in Manhattan, New York

- U.S. National Register of Historic Places
- U.S. Historic district – Contributing property
- New York State Register of Historic Places
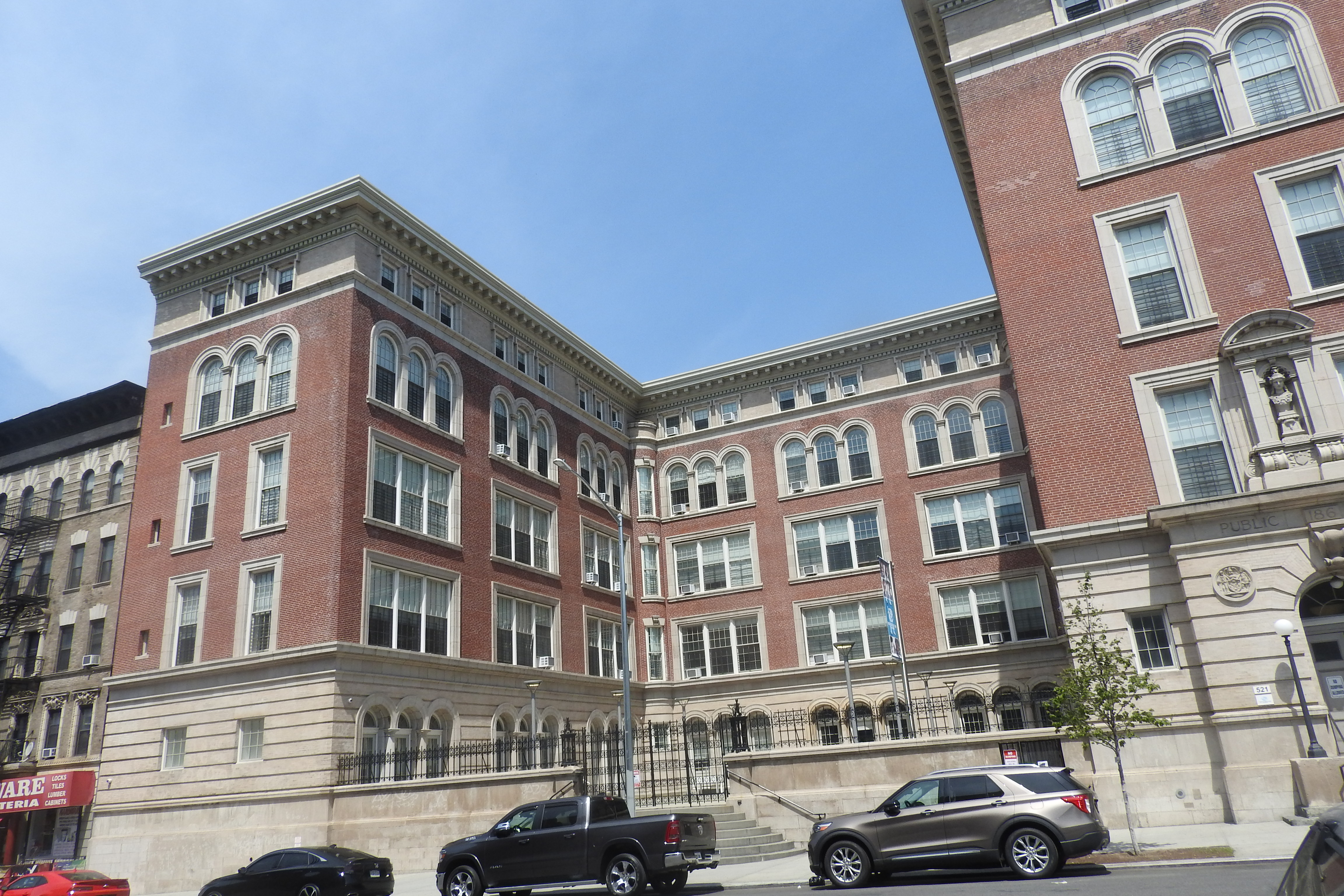

- Location within Manhattan Location within New York City Location within New York Location within the United States
- Location: 521 W. 145th St., Manhattan, New York, US
- Coordinates: 40°49′34″N 73°56′55″W
- Area: 0.72 acres (0.29 ha)
- Built: 1903
- Architect: C. B. J. Snyder
- Part of: West Harlem Historic District (ID100008341)
- NRHP reference No.: 100000997
- NYSRHP No.: 06101.017259

Significant dates
- Added to NRHP: May 15, 2017
- Designated NYSRHP: March 28, 2017

P.S. 186 (Public School 186) is a former school building at 521 West 145th Street in the Hamilton Heights neighborhood of Manhattan, New York City, United States. Designed by Charles B. J. Snyder, it was opened in 1903 and occupies a midblock site between Broadway and Amsterdam Avenue, extending north to 146th Street. P.S. 186 measures five stories high and has an H-shaped floor plan with a pair of north–south wings connected by an east–west crossbar section. The wings surround two courtyards. The exterior is primarily clad in brick with decorative terracotta ornamentation, and includes a main entrance in the east wing on 145th Street, as well as side entrances in the courtyards. The interior contains offices on the first floor and housing elsewhere, retaining some of the original layout.

The school operated for 72 years, during which numerous upgrades to utility systems, cooking facilities, and windows were carried out. By the early 1970s, the building was in serious disrepair, and it closed when a replacement school, P.S. 135, was built nearby. The building sat abandoned for four decades and fell into a serious state of disrepair, while plans were made to =redevelop the site. It was purchased by the Boys and Girls Club of Harlem, then restored into residences in 2017 by Dattner Architects. It is listed on the National Register of Historic Places.

== Description ==
P.S. 186 is a five-story building at 521 West 145th Street in the Hamilton Heights neighborhood of Manhattan, New York City, United States. It is located midblock between Broadway and Amsterdam Avenue. The building was designed in 1903 by Charles B. J. Snyder, who at the time was the city's school buildings superintendent. Snyder had designed numerous public schools across the city.

=== Exterior ===
P.S. 186 measures five stories high. It has an H-shaped floor plan with a pair of north–south wings to the west and east, connected at the center by an east–west crossbar. The crossbar and the wings surround a pair of central courtyards facing north and south, a plan Snyder used to maximize exterior light and air exposure for classrooms. The building is designed in the Renaissance Revival style with three horizontal layers: base, shaft, and capital. Its exterior is primarily clad in brick—buff-colored on the first and fifth floors, and red in between—with decorative terracotta ornamentation. The courtyards between the wings of the H differ in size; the north courtyard is two bays deep, while the south courtyard is three bays deep. The crossbar of the H is three bays wide. The south courtyard is accessed by bluestone steps and is surrounded by a fence; it has an entrance leading to a multipurpose room inside. The north courtyard has similar steps and fence leading to another entrance.

The first floor is raised on a stone plinth, and a terracotta cornice separates the rusticated first-floor base from the upper stories. This floor uses arched windows on its first floor. These windows, a contrast to similar public school buildings with rectangular windows on their first stories, are set in groups of one or three. The windows are surrounded by terracotta frames, and the mullions in the groups of three are composed of Doric half-columns. The main entrance is through an archway in the eastern wing of the primary (145th Street) facade, which faces south. The archway has a stoop flanked by circular terracotta plaques; above it is an entablature with the text "Public 186 School", bisected by a keystone. A terracotta bust of the Roman goddess Minerva is placed within a niche just above the main entrance's entablature.

The north and south ends of each wing are each two bays wide on the first through third floors, and are spanned by three windows on the fourth and fifth floors. The windows facing 146th Street are asymmetrical, with rectangular windows to the west and square panes to the east. On the courtyard elevations, the windows are arranged in groups of three; they have rectangular panes on the second and third floors, arched windows on the fourth, and smaller square panes on the fifth. The windows retain their original terracotta surrounds. The courtyards have rounded interior corners (two in the southern courtyard and one in the northern). Each rounded corner has narrow windows on the second through fourth floors, each with lintels and scrolled keystones. The west and east elevations have unadorned brick walls.

=== Interior ===
A stair inside

The interior contains offices and housing, retaining some of the original layout. The southern half of the first floor has offices for the Boys and Girls Club of Harlem, which redeveloped the building in the 2010s. On the first floor, the southern end of the eastern wing has a lobby leading to offices and meeting rooms, along with a staircase. The southern end of the western wing has program rooms, and the crossbar has a multipurpose room, offices, restrooms, stairs, and elevators. At the center of the crossbar, a lobby for the residences faces north. The crossbar originally had four sets of interlocking double stairs, but these have since been removed.

The remainder of the building contains apartments in its entirety. The residences consist of studio apartments, along with one- and two-bedroom units. Some of the old classroom trim, doors, and walls remain extant. The tripartite windows on the facade originally corresponded to one classroom each, but the old classrooms have since been subdivided, so some of the modern-day apartments may share one window.

== History ==
=== Use as school ===
Built to serve the area's growing population, P.S. 186 was the first public school built in Hamilton Heights. The New York City Board of Education began soliciting plans for the school building in 1901. P.S. 186 was completed in 1903; its first principal, Joseph H. Wade, led it for five years. The school benefited from the proximity of the New York City Subway, whose first line opened less than a block away at the 145th Street station in 1904. Though African Americans were rapidly moving to the area, development in the immediate surrounding blocks slowed when the neighborhood's real-estate bubble burst in 1904 and 1905.

P.S. 186 was used as a public elementary school for three-quarters of a century. In the school's early years, most of the neighborhood's residents were Eastern and Southern immigrants; photographs from the 1910s show a student body composed mostly of white students. P.S. 186 underwent numerous upgrades starting in 1911, which included upgrades to utility systems and cooking facilities; the windows were also replaced in 1932. The Black population of the neighborhood grew over the following decades, comprising almost 90% of the population by 1940.

The school hosted evening classes in the 1940s, and later in the decade, the building was included in the Board of Education's 1946 modernization plan, budgeted at $130 million. By the mid-1950s, to relieve overcrowding at the nearby P.S. 133, some of that school's students were transferred to P.S. 186 instead. P.S. 186 was by then considered a "problem school" where the Board of Education had to give additional enticements to teachers. Nine out of every ten students at the school were Black or Puerto Rican by 1960, though staff and faculty were largely non-Black, contributing to high turnover among the school's teachers. The fifth-floor gymnasium was renovated into a cafeteria in 1967. A new school nearby, at Amsterdam Avenue, 146th Street, and 147th Street, was also proposed in 1967, but funding for that school was rescinded in 1971 due to budget cuts.

By the early 1970s, the building was in poor condition, with broken windows and reports of cockroaches. On February 23, 1971, parents, teachers, and staff staged a boycott of the school to demand that the replacement be built. The leader of the National Economic Growth and Reconstruction Organization, a Black community organization, demanded that the building be closed because of its hazardous conditions, which included flammable stairs, a missing fire-alarm system, and dead-end corridor. National Economic Growth and Reconstruction moved two-fifths of the school's 1,500 students to another school. Following the discovery of defects in the fire alarm system, the school was closed to most students in March 1972, except for some kindergarten classes. The city instead decided to build a replacement school, P.S. 153, for $7 million. P.S. 186 ultimately closed entirely in 1975, following the opening of P.S. 153 that year.

=== Abandonment ===
The building sat unused for four decades. The city decided to sell it in 1985 to the Convent Avenue Baptist Church for $215,000. The church planned to renovate it and rent the space to 11 groups and organizations. The M. L. Wilson Boys Club of Harlem (later the Boys and Girls Club), a group affiliated with the church, took over the structure that November. In exchange, the club was obligated to use 85% of the building as nonprofit space, though this restriction expired after 25 years; the club's contract specified that significant development be completed on the property within three years of the purchase date. Initially, the club planned to spend $18 million converting it into a community social center. Since the club was a nonprofit, it was exempt from paying property taxes on the building as long as it could show evidence of "contemplated use" for nonprofit purposes. By 1989, the old school building was planned to be replaced with a multipurpose building. An Israeli–Black basketball game was hosted nearby in 1996 to raise money for the renovation of the building. Members of Manhattan Community Board 9 claimed that the church's pastor failed to attend several community meetings regarding the building's proposed renovation.

The church still had not raised enough money to renovate the building by 2002. By then, the school building was full of graffiti, the roof was overgrown with plants, the windows were broken, and part of the roof had collapsed. A tree was growing out of the hole in the roof. There were also homeless people and drug users loitering around the building, and neighborhood residents complained that the structure attracted garbage and rodents. Preservationists believed the building was too badly decayed to save. In 2007, the club designated ARCTAC Development Partners as the site developer, proposing that the structure be replaced with twin residential towers. By the next year, no improvements had been made, and the building was still vacant.

Alembic was selected as the new developer in 2009. That year, the Harlem Community Development Corporation offered $100,000 in pre-development funding for the project . At the time, the building was to include space for the Boys and Girls Club, affordable housing, community space, and a post office. By 2010, the Boys and Girls Club was planning to demolish the P.S. 186 building, arguing that the building was too derelict to save. The Boys and Girls Club planned to replace the old building with a new school, commercial space, and 90 apartments. The demolition proposal attracted opposition from preservationists, who circulated a petition to prevent the demolition. Neighborhood residents unsuccessfully sought to have the building made a New York City designated landmark.

=== Redevelopment ===
People sitting in the courtyard outside the redeveloped school

The Boys and Girls Club, along with its partners Monadnock Development and Alembic Community Development, obtained $48.7 million in financing for a renovation in 2014. The renovation entailed converting the interiors into 79 apartments, of which 63 were designated as affordable housing. The project, which cost $49 million, was designed by Dattner Architects and completed in 2017. A children's club opened at the building in 2016. P.S. 186 was listed on the National Register of Historic Places in 2017, following advocacy from the building's redevelopment team. In 2020, the developers opened a waitlist for the building's affordable apartments.

== See also ==
- National Register of Historic Places listings in Manhattan above 110th Street
- P.S. 109, another Snyder-designed school on the National Register of Historic Places

== Sources ==
- Arrington, J.; LaValle, C.S.; Breen, P. (2022). From Factories to Palaces: Architect Charles B. J. Snyder and the New York City Public Schools. Fordham University Press. ISBN 978-0-8232-9918-8.
- [National Park Service] (2017). National Register of Historic Places Inventory/Nomination: Public School 186 (Report). National Park Service.
