= Norton Harding Van Sicklen =

Norton Harding Van Sicklen, Sr.
- Born: February 9, 1864; Lafayette, Indiana, U.S.
- Died: June 21, 1932 (aged 68); Chicago, Illinois, U.S.
- Engineering career
- Significant advance: automotive

Norton Harding van Sicklen, Sr. (1864 – 1932) was a bicycle and automobile publisher and entrepreneur and racing cyclist.

== Cycling ==
Norton H. Van Sicklen had a long and varied career in both the bicycle and automobile industry of the United States. He rode his first penny-farthing bicycle in 1878 and, until 1886, he was a successful competitor in the track and road races that enjoyed great popularity during the bicycle crazes of the late 19th century. In 1886, he won the 10 Mile Championship of the League of American Wheelmen. It was, however, after changing to the safety bicycle that he celebrated most success on the road. From 1889 onward he took several best times in high level road races.

== Publishing and automobile industry ==
In 1890 he began the publication of the successful bicycle trade paper Bearings. In 1898, this paper was merged with two others to become Cycle Age under the management of Samuel A. Miles. Miles in 1899 established the automobile publication Motor Age, and Van Sicklen took this over in 1904. He continued publication of Motor Age until the disturbed period following the financial panic of 1907 and, in January 1908 sold it to Horace M. Swetland of the Class Journal Company.

Following the sale of Motor Age he became the branch manager of the Knox Automobile Co. in Chicago. Later, he took great interest in the Automobile Blue Books, and for a year or so he was engaged in their development. In 1910, after disposing of his interest in the Blue Book, he became manager of the F.A.L. Motor Car Co., an assembling enterprise located in Chicago.

Van Sicklen was instrumental in the organization of the Chicago Motor Club and the American Automobile Association, and was president of both bodies. In 1913, he began the manufacture of the Van Sicklen speedometer in Elgin, Illinois, a business that he developed into an important enterprise before it was taken over by John N. Willys in fall 1919. Willys later sold it to the Stewart-Warner Corporation.

During World War I, the company was engaged in the manufacture of aircraft instruments for the United States Government. After the war, in 1922, he became assistant general manager of the Apperson Automobile Co. in Kokomo and, a few months later, he was promoted to the position of general manager of the concern, which he held until its dissolution in 1926.
