= P.S. 109 =

Historic school in Manhattan, New York

- U.S. National Register of Historic Places
- New York State Register of Historic Places
- New York City Landmark
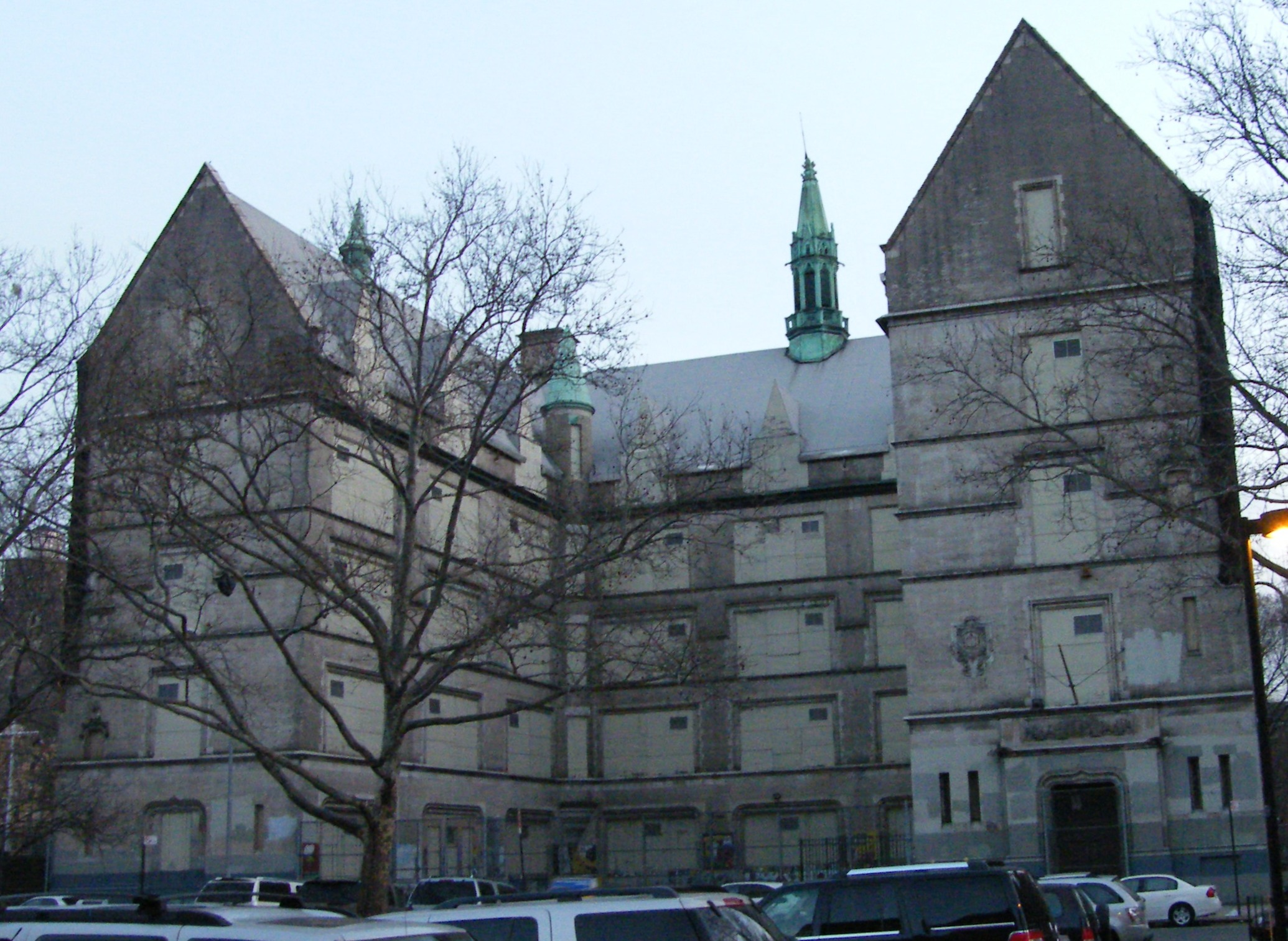
- Seen in March 2009 before restoration

- Location within Manhattan Location within New York City Location within New York Location within the United States
- Location: 215 East 99th St., Manhattan, New York, US
- Coordinates: 40°47′13″N 73°56′48″W
- Area: less than one acre
- Built: 1898
- Architect: C. B. J. Snyder
- NRHP reference No.: 00001159
- NYSRHP No.: 06101.010569
- NYCL No.: 2597

Significant dates
- Added to NRHP: September 22, 2000
- Designated NYSRHP: July 25, 2000
- Designated NYCL: March 27, 2018

P.S. 109 (Public School 109), also known as El Barrio's Artspace PS109, is a school building at 215 East 99th Street in the East Harlem neighborhood of Manhattan, New York City, United States. Designed by Charles B. J. Snyder, it is five stories high. The building has an H-shaped floor plan with wings flanking a pair of courtyards. The base of the building is clad in limestone, and the first through fifth stories have brick facades with terracotta decoration. The building has a steel superstructure and initially included simple classroom spaces, which have since been converted into 90 apartments.

The P.S. 109 building was constructed between 1898 and 1909 to replace an earlier school in a tobacco factory. The building operated as a public school until 1996, when severe deterioration prompted a sudden evacuation. P.S. 109 was closed and nearly demolished, but it was saved due to opposition from preservationists. Following an extended period of abandonment, it was converted into a cultural and housing complex for artists. It is listed on the National Register of Historic Places and is a New York City designated landmark.

== Description ==
P.S. 109 is a five-story building situated at 215 East 99th Street in the East Harlem neighborhood of Manhattan, New York City, United States. It is located midblock between Second and Third avenues. The school originally spanned the width of a city block, adjoining the former 100th Street to its north. The adjacent section of 100th Street and all the tenement buildings around P.S. 109 were destroyed in the 1960s, replaced by green space and apartment buildings; the modern-day school is encircled by the George Washington Houses.

P.S. 109 was designed in the late 1890s by Charles B. J. Snyder, who at the time of construction was the city's school buildings superintendent. The school is designed in the Collegiate Gothic style with elements inspired by buildings at Oxford and Cambridge universities in England. Gothic elements in the building include turrets, spires, label moldings, and steeply pitched roofs with dormers. By the 1990s, it was one of the city's last Gothic-style school buildings.

=== Exterior ===
P.S. 109 measures five stories high. It has an H-shaped floor plan with a pair of north–south wings to the west and east, connected at the center by an east–west crossbar. The crossbar and the wings surround a pair of central courtyards facing north and south, a plan Snyder used to maximize exterior light and air exposure for classrooms. A low parapet wall and metal fence surround the south courtyard, where a gate is flanked by lamps on stone pedestals. The north courtyard has a smaller parapet with a similar fence and gate.

The base of the building is clad in limestone, and the first through fifth stories have brick facades with terracotta decoration. The New York City Landmarks Preservation Commission (LPC) writes that the first through fifth stories also include limestone trim, while the National Park Service (NPS) describes these decorations as terracotta decorated to resemble limestone. Although the southern and northern elevations have similar massings or general shapes, the southern elevation has more elaborate decoration; the northern elevation was left bare after a 2010s renovation. The side (western and eastern) elevations have blank brick walls interrupted by lightwells, which helped reduce noise from outside.

==== Design details ====
In general, the lower four floors consist mainly of sparsely-decorated door and window openings. String courses wrap horizontally across the facade above the each story. The southern elevation has a pair of Tudor-arch portals facing 99th Street. The western wing's portal is flanked by two narrow openings. The eastern wing's more ornate portal (originally the main entrance) was carved out of a large block of limestone that has since been cut back. There foliate motifs within the eastern portal itself, above which is a cornice with gargoyles at either end. Above the cornice is a rectangular pediment with shields, ribbons, arms, and terracotta motifs, along with terracotta decorations which are arranged to spell out the words public school 109. Above the western wing's south entrance, each of the upper stories has a terracotta drip molding to the left of a central arched opening. Similar decorations exist in a mirrored configuration above the eastern wing's south entrance, except that the second floor also has a depiction of the New York City Board of Education's seal to the left of the window. The northern elevation has similar portals that have since been filled in.

On the southern elevations of both north–south wings, each of the upper stories has one sash window underneath a stationary transom. Both courtyards are surrounded by facades on three sides. Each elevation of either courtyard has three bays of wide windows per floor. Each bay is surrounded by quoins, and contains mullions dividing it into multiple sections. The inner corners of the courtyards have turrets, which each have one window per floor facing diagonally toward the courtyard. The south courtyard has a cylindrical turret to the west and a chamfered cylindrical turret to the east, while the north courtyard has a single octagonal turret to the east.

On the fifth floor, dormers protrude from the roof; the National Park Service characterizes the dormers as being in the French Renaissance style. There are no dormers at the north and south ends of each wing, where the roof terminates in gables. The fifth-floor roof dormers have intricate terracotta details including crests, ribbons, floral motifs, and winged dragons. The dormers have smaller windows than those on the floors below. The roof is steeply pitched and has skylights. There are metal gutters and drainage pipes leading from the roof to the courtyards.

=== Interior ===
The building has a steel superstructure. The school originally had four levels of classrooms. The first story had a lobby, some offices, two kindergarten playrooms, and attached kindergarten classrooms, along with some bathrooms. The playrooms had tiled wainscoted walls and asphalt floors. There were 16 classrooms each on the second to fourth stories. There was also a library, and the crossbar of the "H" had an assembly room. The fifth story had a gymnasium and other physical education facilities, and as with the first story had bathrooms. The walls, and the ceilings in the assembly room and gymnasium, were made of plaster. Trim, doorways, and baseboards were made of wood, and the doors and windows used both wood and glass. Some ceilings had pressed metal decorations, and the floors were made of oak boards.

The modern interior contains 90 apartments, which consist of studio apartments and one- and two-bedroom units. Each apartment has about 480 to 900 square feet (45 to 84 m^{2}) of living space, along with an attached art studio. The apartments include fixtures such as bamboo floors and faucets. There is also a community event space spanning 15,000 square feet (1,400 m^{2}).

== History ==
=== School usage ===
East Harlem was sparsely developed until the 1860s, when European immigrants began moving to the neighborhood after tenements were built there. By 1900, eighty thousand people lived in the area between 92nd and 110th streets alone. One of the schools serving East Harlem's large population, P.S. 109, was operating in an old tobacco factory on Second Avenue. In 1898. Charles B. J. Snyder decided to develop a new school building for P.S. 109, located on 99th Street between Second and Third avenues. Plans for a five-story building were filed that February, at which point the building was to be partly funded by $72,985 in bond funding (equivalent to $2,408,000 in 2025). P. J. Brennan was hired as the building's contractor, receiving a $293,000 contract (equivalent to $9,665,000 in 2025). The new building's construction was delayed. Due to steel shortages for the new building, P.S. 109 had to stay in the tobacco factory for several months after the lease expired.

P.S. 109 moved into its new building in 1901. The building initially could fit 2,250 students and functioned as a primary school for decades. By 1933, the building hosted 1,400 students of the Aviation Annex of Haaren High School. The following year, the New York City Board of Education recommended that P.S. 109 be converted to house a boys' high school, relieving overcrowding at the DeWitt Clinton High School and another school. During that decade, Works Progress Administration workers made repairs to the building. All the buildings surrounding P.S. 109, along with 100th Street, were demolished in the early 1950s to make way for the George Washington Houses. The development, consisting of 14 buildings and green space surrounding the school, was completed in 1957. By that time, the area and the student body had become predominantly black and Puerto Rican.

P.S. 109 was overcrowded by 1959, when the Board of Education began moving some students to schools in Yorkville, Manhattan. At the time, there was a pronounced racial divide between the two neighborhoods; most students at P.S. 109 were black and Hispanic, while the students in Yorkville's schools were largely white. Starting in November 1972, many students boycotted P.S. 109 and other schools citywide for several weeks after their teachers and assistant principals were shifted to different schools across the city. Though the principal transfers were later halted, the school had less than a dozen students attending on some days. For the 1981–1982 school year, a magnet school called Manhattan East moved into P.S. 109; it was one of several alternative schools that were opening in East Harlem around that time. In contrast to the rest of P.S. 109, Manhattan East, which occupied the fifth floor of the building, selected its students through an interview and screening process.

By the late 20th century, the building was dilapidated, and the size of the student population had declined substantially. By 1996, the fifth-floor gym was so badly water-damaged that it had been closed entirely, and students had to play in the cafeteria or outside. Additional reinforcement had to be installed in the gym, where water sometimes dripped onto the fourth floor. That February, when the school hosted a hearing on the condition of New York City's public schools, the Staten Island Advance wrote that the plasterwork and paint was falling off. Construction of a neighboring playground caused the school to shake constantly, forcing its sudden evacuation in April 1996. A $4 million renovation of P.S. 109 was proposed that year, but the declining student body, combined with the building's poor condition, prompted the city to instead abandon the school entirely.

=== Abandonment and preservation ===
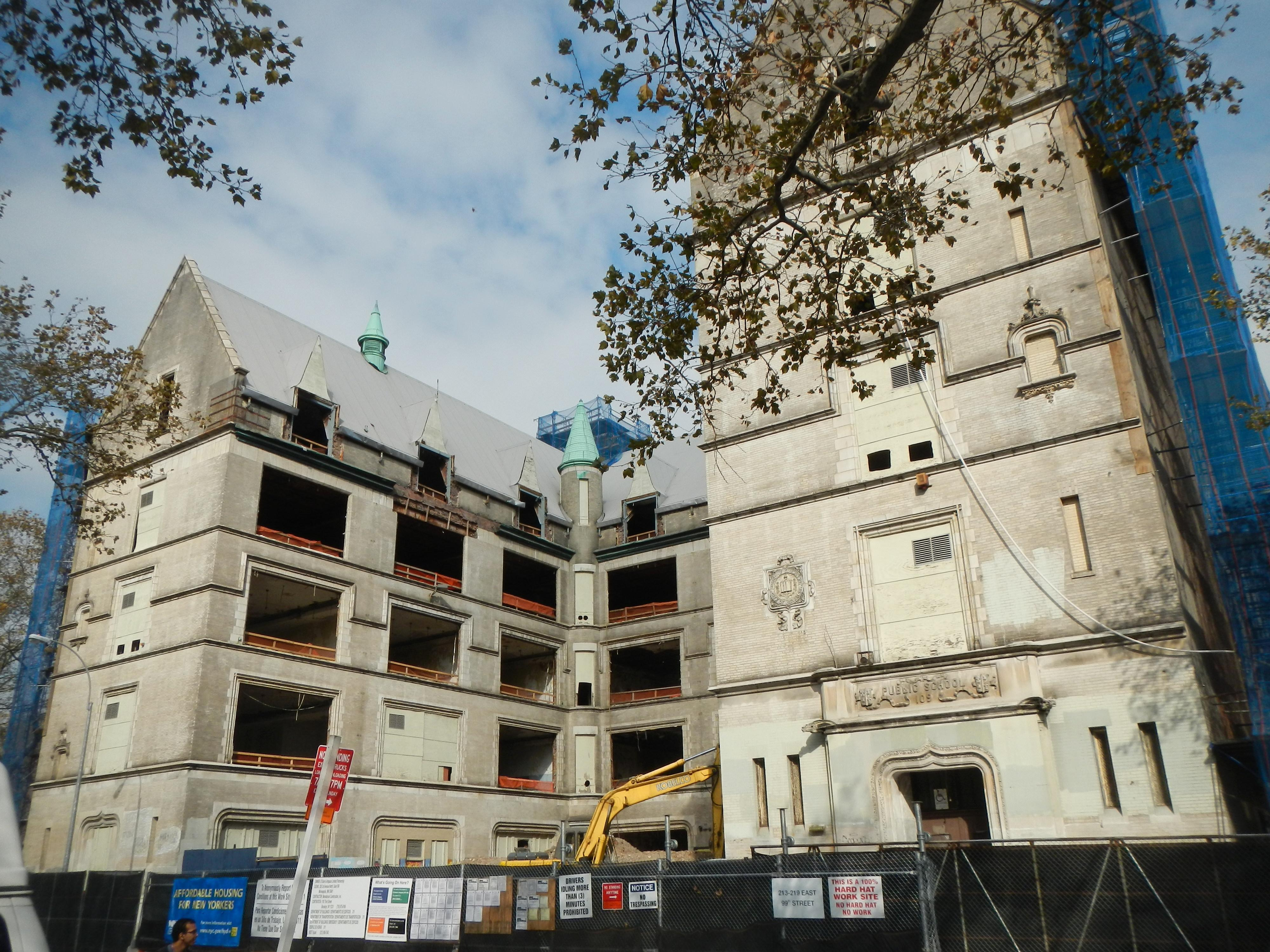
The school being renovated in 2012

When the school was abandoned, the windows were boarded up. In 1999, workers began removing the ornamentation in preparation for demolition. This triggered opposition from local residents, and the New York City Department of Buildings placed a temporary stop-work order; the city government sealed the school back up and replaced the partially demolished roof. A local resident, Gwen Goodwin, formed a group in an attempt to prevent the demolition. Goodwin's group argued that P.S. 109 and another dilapidated school in the Bronx, P.S. 31, were "monuments in communities that have little else". The National Trust for Historic Preservation listed both schools on its America's 11 Most Endangered Historic Places for 2000.

After the New York State Office of Parks, Recreation and Historic Preservation determined the building eligible for state landmark designation, P.S. 109 was added to the New York State Register of Historic Places and the National Register of Historic Places in 2000. By then, most of the original ornamentation had been dismantled or taken. That December, the Board of Education's Manhattan representative announced that the proposed demolition had been canceled. The Board of Education instead began soliciting bids to make repairs. For several years, there were discussions over how to repurpose the building; Goodwin proposed reopening it as a school, but the city wished to sell it, estimating that repairs would cost $25 million. In 2006, the Minnesota-based developer Artspace proposed converting the old P.S. 109 into 64 artists' apartments, along with community space in the basement and ground floor. The apartments were intended as affordable housing for artists.

Artspace bought P.S. 109 from the city government in 2012 for a nominal fee of $1. Artspace initially set a budget of $24 million for the project and received an equivalent amount of tax credits from the city government. The project took two years and ultimately cost $52 million; it was partially funded by city, state, and national tax credits. As part of the project, Artspace repaired or replaced decorations such as gargoyles and roofs. Workers installed windows in the facade and renovated the interiors. Artspace began soliciting applications for the building's 90 apartments in 2014; these apartments attracted 53,000 applicants. The conversion was completed in 2015. Ahead of a rezoning of East Harlem, P.S. 109 was nominated for city landmark designation in 2017, and the New York City Landmarks Preservation Commission designated P.S. 109 as a city landmark in March 2018.

== See also ==
- List of New York City Designated Landmarks in Manhattan from 59th to 110th Streets
- National Register of Historic Places listings in Manhattan from 59th to 110th Streets
- P.S. 186, another Snyder-designed school on the National Register of Historic Places

== Sources ==
- National Register of Historic Places Inventory/Nomination: Public School 109 (PDF) (Report). National Park Service. 2000.
- Public School 109 (now El Barrio's Artspace PS109) Designation Report (PDF) (Report). New York City Landmarks Preservation Commission. March 27, 2018.
