= Fal-Car =

Defunct American motor vehicle manufacturer

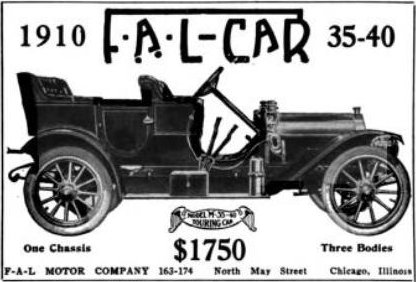
- 1910 FAL-Car advertisement

Overview
- Manufacturer: Department C Norton H. Van Sicklen
- Also called: A Car Without A Name
- Production: 1909–1914
- Assembly: Chicago, Illinois

Body and chassis
- Body style: Roadster, coupe-tonneau, touring car

Powertrain
- Engine: 30hp
- Transmission: 3-speed

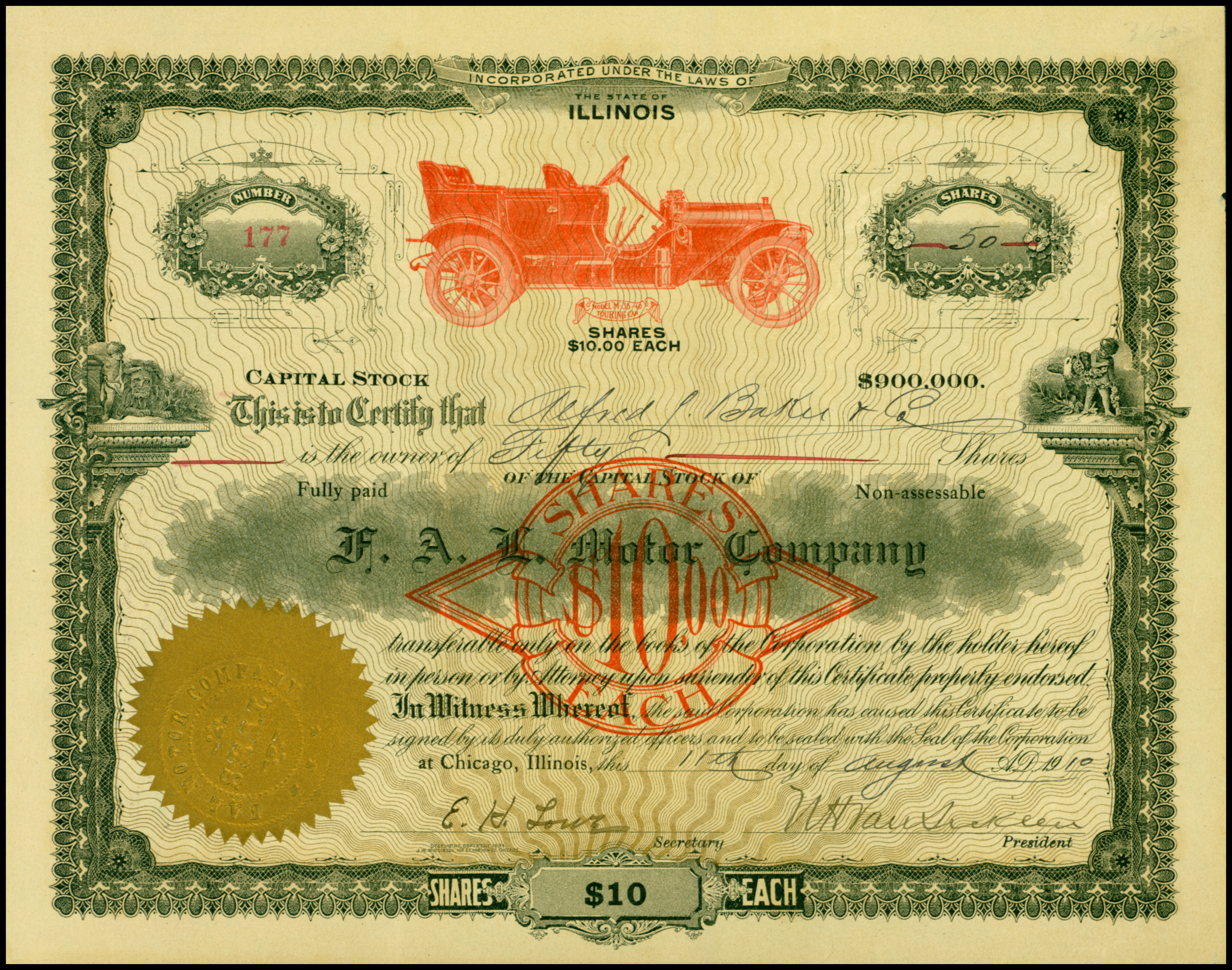
Share of the FAL Motor Company, issued August 11 1910

The Fal-Car, originally known as A Car Without A Name, was an American automobile manufactured from 1909 until 1914 by a company that identified itself in advertisements only as Department C, 19 North May Street, Chicago. The address had previously been the location where the Reliable-Dayton automobile had been built. It was advertised as "trim, classy, speedy and efficient".

The idea behind the name, or lack thereof, was that it would allow its buyers of the generic vehicle to name the vehicle as they wished without the expense or bother of setting up their own automobile concern. Such practices in the early days of the automobile market were not uncommon, however most companies that were involved with such endeavors at least had publicly known names.

The vehicle was equipped with a 30 hp engine, three-speed transmission, came in three body styles (roadster, coupe-tonneau and touring car) and priced below $1,700 per unit. Because the car had no name, it is impossible to find a concrete production number for the period that builds were undertaken.

By 1910 the car was given an official name, the F.A.L. (Note: Not to be confused with the F.A.L., a French automobile manufactured in 1907 only.) or Fal-Car, which was derived by its backers' last names of Fauntleroy, Averill and Lowe. Under the management of Norton H. Van Sicklen, the Fal-Car continued in production through 1914 at its factory in Chicago until its assets were liquidated at auction. The former business location became an empty lot.
