= Talbot Hamlin =

Architect, professor, and librarian

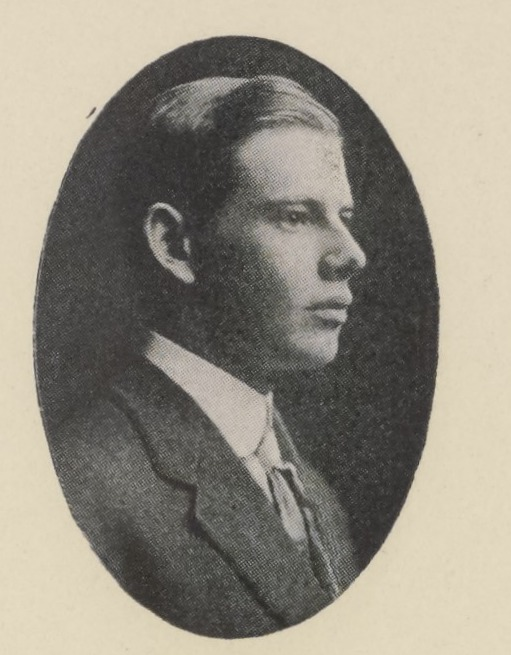
- Born: June 16, 1889; New York City, U.S.
- Died: October 7, 1956 (aged 67); Beaufort, South Carolina, U.S.
- Education: Horace Mann School, Amherst College, School of Architecture at Columbia University
- Employer(s): McGill and Hamlin
- Known for: Architect, architectural historian
- Parent(s): Alfred Dwight Foster Hamlin (1855-1926), Minnie Florence Marston Hamlin (1859-?)

Talbot Faulkner Hamlin (June 16, 1889 – October 7, 1956) was an American architect, architectural historian, writer and educator. Ginling College, Peking University, and the Wayland Academy were among his major work projects, particularly in China.

== Early years ==
Born in New York City, Hamlin was the fourth child of Alfred Dwight Foster Hamlin (1855–1926), a professor of architecture at Columbia University. He graduated from Amherst College in 1910 with a BA degree, and from Columbia University in 1914 with a degree in architecture, the beginning of a 46-year relationship with Columbia.

== Career ==
Architectural projects early in his career include Wayland Academy, Hangzhou, China, 1919; Peking University, Peking, China, 1919–1922; and Ginling College, Nanking, China, 1919–1925. The Ginling College campus was to play an important role during the Rape of Nanking in 1937.

Hamlin was hired as a draftsman in the New York architectural firm of Murphy and Dana. He became a partner of the firm in 1920. In 1921, both Richard Henry Dana Jr. (1879–1933) and J. Duncan Forsythe departed, so with the addition of Henry J. McGill ( - 1953), the firm became Murphy, McGill and Hamlin. That combination lasted until 1924, when Henry Killam Murphy (1877–1954) withdrew and the firm became known as McGill and Hamlin. This partnership with Henry J. McGill ended in 1930, and Hamlin began his own solo practice, which lasted until the Depression, when commissions became scarce.

In 1934, he relinquished his professional practice and accepted the full-time position of Avery Librarian for the Avery Architectural and Fine Arts Library at Columbia University.

Hamlin was also an active member of the Society of Architectural Historians.

== Published works include ==
- The Enjoyment Of Architecture (1916)
- The American Spirit in Architecture (1926)
- Some European Architectural Libraries (1939)
- Architecture through the Ages (1940)
- Greek Revival Architecture in America (1944)
- Architecture: An Art for all Men (1947)
- We took to cruising; from Maine to Florida afloat (1951)
- Forms and Functions of Twentieth Century Architecture (1952)
- Benjamin Henry Latrobe (1955)

Hamlin's biography of the American architect Benjamin Henry Latrobe won the 1956 Pulitzer Prize, and the 1955 Alice Davis Hitchcock Award.

== Political activity ==
Hamlin's political activities were noted in a report, "Prepared and released by the House Committee on Un-American Activities, United States House of Representatives, Washington, D. C. April 19, 1949.
The committee included California congressman Richard Nixon.

"Talbot Hamlin was a sponsor of the Scientific and Cultural Conference for World Peace which ran from March 25–27, 1949 in New York City. It was arranged by a Communist Party USA front organization known as the National Council of the Arts, Sciences, and Professions. The conference was a follow-up to a similar gathering, the strongly anti-America, pro-Soviet World Congress of Intellectuals in Defense of Peace which was held in Poland, August 25–28, 1948.

At another point in the HUAC report Hamlin is noted in a section that reads:

"Letter protesting ban on entrance of Oscar Niemeyer, 1948 (total 3): Thomas H. Creighton, Talbot Hamlin, Jacob Moscowitz"
