= Rivington House =

Building in Manhattan, New York

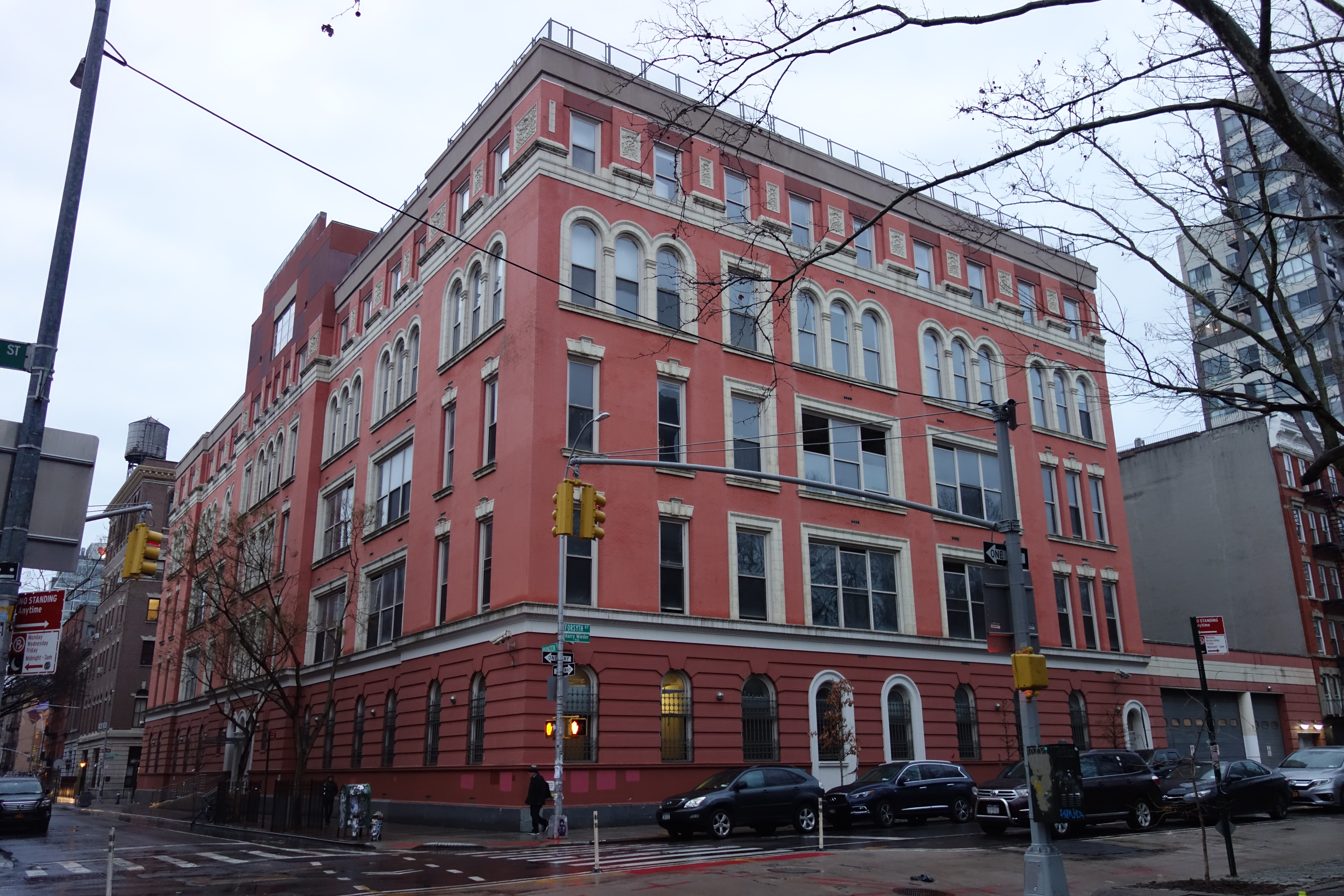
- The Rivington House in December 2018

General information
- Type: Former AIDS/HIV nursing home
- Location: Lower East Side, Manhattan, 45 Rivington St, New York, NY 10002, New York City, United States
- Coordinates: 40.7207°N 73.9911°W
- Renovated: 2016
- Owner: China Vanke Co., Adam America Real Estate, and Slate Property Group

Rivington House (45 Rivington Street) is a building located at Rivington Street and Forsyth Street on the Lower East Side of Manhattan in New York City. It was originally constructed as an elementary school known as Public School 20 in 1898, and then operated as a vocational school beginning in 1942. In the 1990s, the building was purchased by Village Nursing Home (later VillageCare) and was converted into a specialty nursing home for patients with HIV/AIDS.

The building gained media attention in 2015 when it was planned to lift the deed restriction on the building, allowing it to be transformed into a residential or commercial property. When the building was ultimately sold for $116 million, Mayor Bill de Blasio drew criticism for straying from his policy to increase affordable housing in the city. The building was eventually reclassified and sold to China Vanke Co., Adam America Real Estate, and Slate Property Group for residential development.

== Design ==
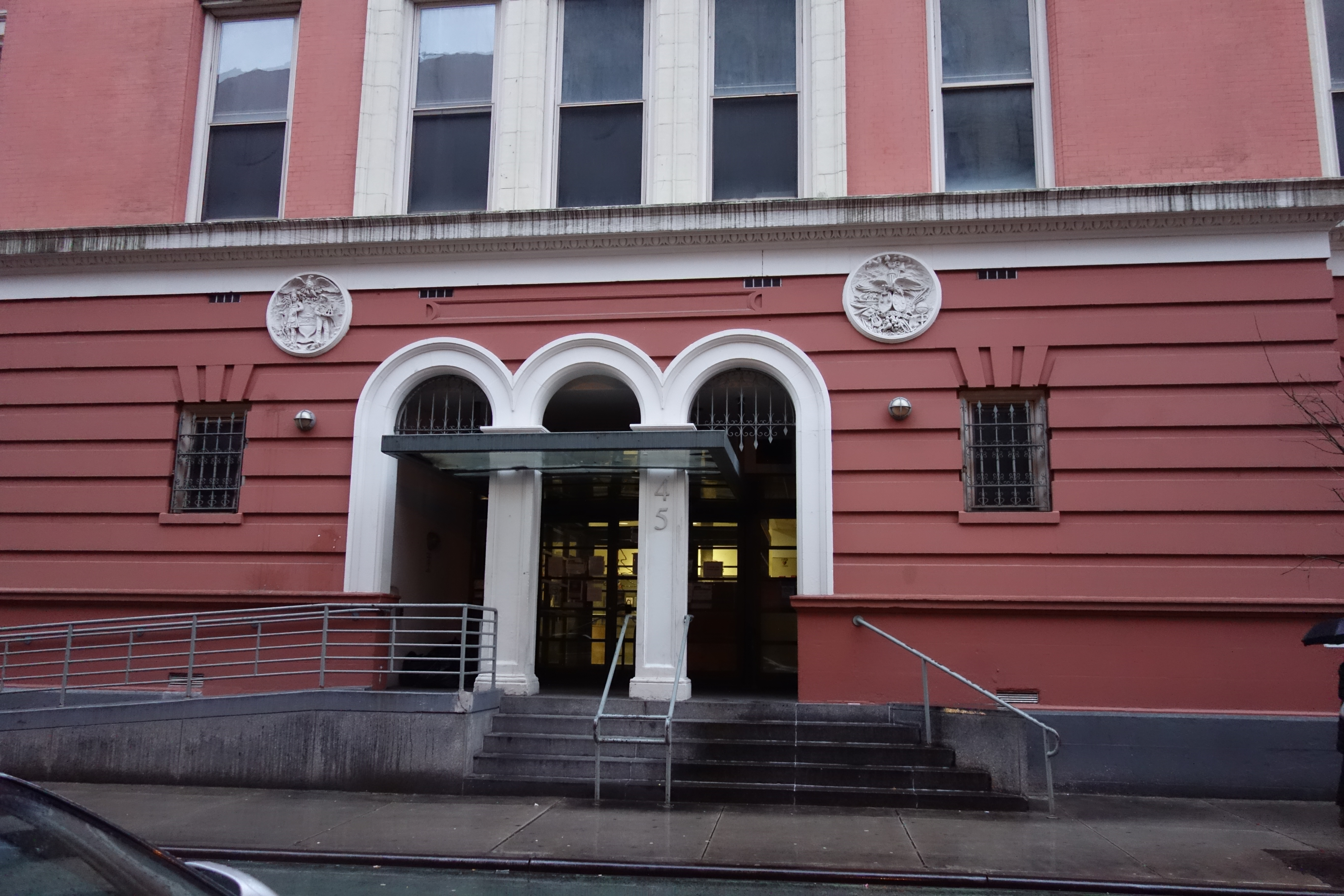
The entrance to the building on Rivington Street.

The Rivington House is located on the south side of Rivington Street between Forsyth Street and Eldridge Street on the Lower East Side. Across Forsyth Street to the west is Sara Delano Roosevelt Park. The building was constructed from 1897 to 1898, designed by architect C. B. J. Snyder in Renaissance Revival or Romanesque Revival style. Snyder, at the time the city's Superintendent of School Buildings, designed numerous other schools throughout the city. The building is five stories tall, with a basement and a small sixth floor in the center of the building. Its exterior features several decorative elements, including large stone-framed windows, several of which are arched, stone belt courses in between stories, and terracotta moldings. It also features several decorative plaques, including two at the front entrance on Rivington Street representing the New York City government. The interior, meanwhile, contains cast-iron columns with decorative elements.

The building was originally U-shaped, which was a common quirk of Snyder-designed schools and other city schools to let in more natural light. The open-space was filled in during the 1990s renovations to the building. It also originally featured a yellow-brick facade, but was later altered with pink-red bricks.

The building was renovated from 1993 to 1994 into a nursing home for HIV/AIDS patients by the Perkins & Will and Davis Brody firms. The first floor features a lobby with reception and gift shop areas, a chapel, a meeting room, administrative space, and an intensive care unit with 17 beds. The remaining four floors each contain around 50 beds along with two nurses stations and dining areas. The fifth or penthouse floor contains additional recreation facilities. A ward for tuberculosis patients was also constructed. The basement contains utilities, kitchen facilities, and labs including a radiology suite. A loading dock was constructed as a southern extension of the original building on Forsyth Street.

== Nearby sites ==
- Adath Jeshurun of Jassy Synagogue
- Lower East Side Tenement Museum

== History ==
=== As a school building ===
Public School 20 was completed in 1898, opening on September 12, 1898. Upon opening, the school was also used as an evening recreation center for children. Alumni of the elementary school include Irving Caesar, George and Ira Gershwin, Harry Golden, Jacob Javitz, Paul Muni, and Edward G. Robinson. In 1934, construction began on Sara Delano Roosevelt Park across the street, which would provide boys and girls playgrounds for Public School 20 and the nearby Public School 91.

Public School 20 was closed in June 1942 due to low enrollment, with the nearby P.S. 91 expanding to replace it. Afterwards, the building became the Manhattan Trades Center and hosted special vocational programs for the New York City Board of Education. This began with a high school program to train radio operators which opened on October 7, 1942. The programs at the school contributed to the United States efforts during World War II, with graduates going on to become technicians and radio operators in the Armed Forces and the Merchant Marine. The school also featured programs to train disabled and vision impaired individuals. Following the end of the war, the Board of Education created accelerated vocational and academic programs at the school for returning veterans.

In 1963, a new Public School 20 was opened at Stanton Street and Essex Street. By 1963, the building at Rivington Street was used as the New York City Adult Training Center. At this time, the school operated programs training unemployed people to work in occupations such as house painting, as well a programs to train orderlies and licensed practical nurses, through an initiative from the federal Manpower Development and Training Act.

=== As a nursing home ===
On April 18, 1989, then-New York City Mayor Ed Koch announced that the school would be redeveloped by the Village Nursing Home group into a facility called the Rivington House for patients suffering from HIV/AIDS. The nursing home would contain 230 beds, 80 of which would be reserved for patients from city hospitals. This was in response to the outbreak of the disease around this time, with the Lower East Side being one of the most affected neighborhoods in the city. Later plans called for 45 beds reserved for tuberculosis patients. At this time, the school building had gone unused for several years.

The building was sold by the city to Village Nursing Home and was reconstructed from 1993 to 1994, with funding from public bonds. The renovations were designed by the Perkins & Will and Davis Brody firms. The Davis Brody firm had several employees who had contracted AIDS. The nursing home opened in 1995 with 219 beds. Initially, the typical length of stay for patients was only 12 to 15 days with a 50 percent mortality rate. As treatment options for AIDS improved, by 1997 the length of patient stay increased and many were able to leave the facility and return home. In addition to in-patient care, the Rivington House also offered outpatient services and job placement assistance for patients.

=== Closure and sale ===
Rivington House operated as a HIV/AIDS nursing home until 2015. The lack of patients and the change in community care for people with HIV led VillageCare to announce in 2014 that they would be closing the facility in Manhattan. As local press reported at the time, “the need for a single-purpose skilled nursing facility like Rivington House that segregates AIDS patients is long past."

By 2015, Rivington House was non-performing and nearly vacant, and a nursing home operator in the region called The Allure Group purchased the building. Within the first year under new ownership, the building featured in the New York City press after an application was made to change the property's deed restrictions. Its restrictive deed prevented the property from being developed like many of the buildings in the same district, stating that the building had to be used for non-profit residential health care.

Following the required payment to the Department of Citywide Administrative Services, as determined by the city, the building's deed restriction was lifted, and The Allure Group sold the building for $116 million to a developer. While sales of this value are common in New York City, the media honed in on Mayor Bill de Blasio for moving away from his policy of providing affordable housing. Ricardo Morales, a deputy commissioner at the Citywide Department of Administrative Services was eventually relieved of his duties following the sale of Rivington House.

More information about the deal entered the media in 2016, when Mayor Bill de Blasio suggested he didn't know about the land deal, prior to signing off on the lifting of the deed restriction. The statement made by Bill de Blasio was questioned following the release of a report by the New York City Department of Investigation. The report suggested that while many city officials denied knowing about the details of the deal, they were in fact fully aware of what was taking place. The NY Post reported that Bill de Blasio's administration offered millions of dollars the month prior, in February 2016, to effectively undo the deal as it would reflect badly on the administration.

The report stated that both The Allure Group and the city wanted to reclassify the building, and both parties knew a $17 million fee was needed specifically to remove the deed restriction. The report also showed that the city understood any fees would result in the nursing home being flipped by The Allure Group, as the property was no longer viable in its current position. The New York Times and NY Post made similar remarks to the report, referring to a meeting on March 11, 2015. If a $16.15 million payment was required to lift the deed restriction it “could not afford to pay the cost to remove the deed restriction and retain the property as a nursing home,” and “would consider converting the property into a luxury apartment building and forgo the nursing home renovation.”

The city of New York opened an investigation into what had gone wrong with their management of the situation. However, the probe found no illegal conduct. The city announced they could not sue The Allure Group, as legally they had not done anything wrong and determined instead that there was a need to revamp its own internal policies and procedures. Despite the controversy caused by the sale and removing the deed restriction from Rivington House, the state legislators decided to reject a bill aimed at preventing similar sales from taking place in the future.
