= C. B. J. Snyder =

American architect (1860–1945)

Charles B.J. Snyder
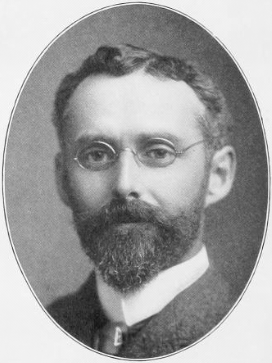

Superintendent of School Buildings
- In office 1891–1923
- Preceded by: George W. Debevoise
- Succeeded by: William H. Gompert

Personal details
- Born: November 4, 1860 Stillwater, New York, U.S.
- Died: November 11, 1945 (aged 85) Babylon, New York, U.S.
- Resting place: Woodlawn Cemetery
- Spouse: Harriet Katharine de Vries (m. 1889)
- Children: 2
- Education: Cooper Union
- Occupation: Architect
- Known for: Design and construction of New York City public schools

Charles B. J. Snyder (November 4, 1860 – November 11, 1945) was an American architect, architectural engineer, and mechanical engineer in the field of urban school building design and construction. He is widely recognized for his leadership, innovation, and transformation of school building construction process, design, and quality during his tenure as Superintendent of School Buildings for the New York City Board of Education between 1891 and 1923.

== Early life and education ==
Snyder was born November 4, 1860, in Stillwater, New York. He was the middle of three children born to George I. Snyder (1834–?), a harness maker, and Charity Ann Snyder (née Shonts, 1834–1919). His two siblings, both sisters, were Ella G. Snyder (1857–1876) and Katy Snyder (born around 1865).

Snyder was a member of the Kane Lodge No. 454, Free and Accepted Masons (New York City); the Jerusalem Chapter, No. 8, Royal Arch Masons (New York City); Order of Harugari, Martha Lodge No. 1,830 of Union Hill, New Jersey; and the Royal Arcanum Huguenot Council, No. 397 (New Rochelle).

He completed public schooling in Stillwater, New York. In 1879, he arrived in New York City, and worked four years with builders in preparation for his profession. In 1883, he began the practice of architecture.

Snyder earned two credentials from Cooper Union technical schools: Cooper Union Free Night School of Science, Class C — Third-Year: May 28, 1881 — Certificate, Practical Geometry (name of record: "Charles Snyder"); and Cooper Union School of Art, May 28, 1884 — Certificate, Elementary Architectural Drawing (name of record: "Chas. B.J. Snyder").

== Career ==
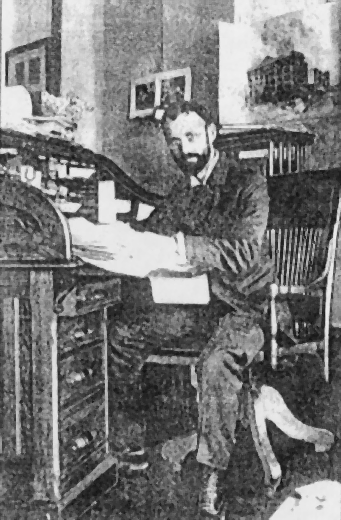
Snyder in his office, c. 1900

From the mid to late 1880s, Snyder worked with William E. Bishop, a New York City master carpenter. Little is known about Bishop except that he was a lifelong volunteer fireman, holding leadership positions in various fire companies.

=== Superintendent of School Buildings ===
At its last meeting of the school year on July 8, 1891, the New York City Board of Education elected Snyder as Superintendent of Buildings to succeed George W. Debevoise after his resignation. Of the thirteen votes cast, Snyder received twelve.

While Snyder initially oversaw Manhattan and The Bronx, the 1898 consolidation of Greater New York elevated him to the ultimate role of Superintendent of School Buildings for the entire city.

==== School design innovations ====
As Superintendent, Snyder thought of school buildings as civic monuments for a better society. Inspired by the Hotel de Cluny in Paris, Snyder began formulating his "H-plan" design in 1896, which modified the more standard rectangular school building structure to provide for two side courts This was first implemented in the plans for PS 165. Snyder's H-plan improved the overall environmental quality by, among other things, allowing generous light and fresh air into classrooms. The plan also allowed for grand courtyard entrances, as well as areas between the wings that were safe for recreation.

In addition to design innovations, Snyder also focused on creating a more streamlined construction process through the following:

- The use of steel skeleton framing for buildings over four stories allowed for cheaper and faster construction, as well as an increased span of window openings.
- Because of the need to produce many buildings in a short time, Snyder's office improved the design and planning ideas of earlier schools and sometimes used the same basic design for several schools.
- Snyder reorganized the Deputy Superintendents so that each was responsible for a single part of the building — such as (i) design and planning, (ii) heating and ventilating, (iii) electricity, (iv) plumbing and drainage, (v) furniture, and (vi) inspection and records — and each reported directly to him.

=== Notable architecture ===
Note: Schools are listed by their original designation.

As Superintendent, Snyder is credited with the design of over 400 structural projects — including more than 140 elementary schools. Snyder worked in several styles, including Beaux Arts, English Collegiate Gothic, Jacobean, and Dutch Colonial. He preferred mid-block locations away from busy and polluted avenues. One of his signature motifs was to design spaces for learning that would offer a respite from noisy streets and poverty. Two of his classically inspired school designs were shown at the 1900 International Exposition (World's Fair) in Paris.

==== Elementary schools ====
===== The Bronx =====
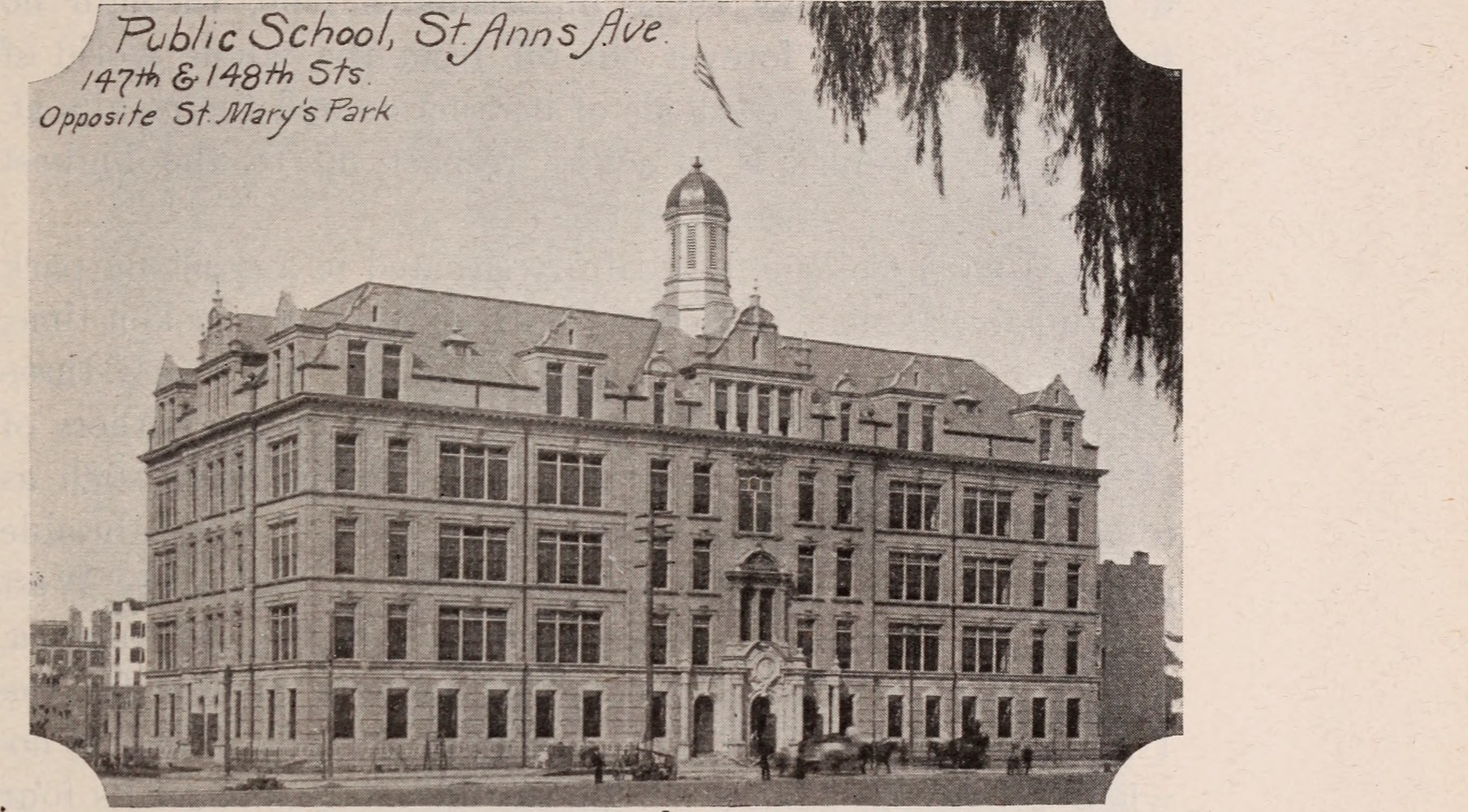
PS 27, The Bronx

- PS 17 (190 Fordham St., E. of City Island Ave.); now City Island Museum
- PS 27 (519 St. Ann's Ave., between 147th & 148th Sts.); NYC Landmark
- PS 28 (1861 Anthony Ave., between Mount Hope Pl. and East Tremont Ave.), a.k.a. The Mount Hope School; a plaque at the entrance verifies that Snyder was the architect, having designed the building in 1896–7, but the numeric designation on the plaque is altered
- PS 32 (690 E 183rd St., between Cambreleng & Beaumont Aves.); red-brick and terra-cotta Gothic structure
- PS 50 (1550 Vyse Ave., between 172nd & 173rd Sts.)

===== Brooklyn =====
- PS 95 (345 Van Sicklen St.)
- PS 157 (850 Kent Ave.)
- PS 133 (375 Butler St.)
- PS 134 (4001 18th Ave.)
- PS 130 (70 Ocean Pkwy.)
- PS 132 (320 Manhattan Ave.)
- PS 154 (1625 11th Ave.)

===== Manhattan =====
- PS 1, Alfred E. Smith School (8 Henry St.); this building featured what some believe was the world's first rooftop playground
- PS 3 (490 Hudson St.); built in 1905–1906 after a previous school at the site had burned down. Now the Charrette School.
- PS 9 (466 West End Ave. at 82nd St.); PS 9 moved to a new building nearby in 1965, and the old building is now the Mickey Mantle School (PS 811M).
- PS 11 (320 W 21st St., Chelsea); one of few New York City public schools to have a swimming pool
- PS 12 (371 Madison St., Lower East Side); also contains a swimming pool and two water-fountain adorned courtyards
- PS 15 (333 E 4th St., Roberto Clemente School)
- PS 16 (208 W 13th St.) now part of the LGBT Community Center
- PS 17 (328 W 48th St.); now PS 212 Midtown West
- PS 20 (45 Rivington St.); now the Rivington House
- PS 23 (70 Mulberry St., Chinatown); now a community center that houses, among other things, the Chen Dance Center
- PS 40 (320 E 20th St.)
- PS 42 (71 Hester St., Chinatown)
- PS 44 (137 Hudson St., Tribeca)
- PS 60 (420 E 12th St.); now East Side Community High School
- PS 61 (610 E 12th St.)
- PS 63 (121 E 3rd St.); now The STAR Academy
- PS 64 (605 E 9th St., Alphabet City); NYC Landmark
- PS 67 (120 W 46th St., between 6th & 7th Aves.); NYC Landmark. Later HS of Performing Arts; later Liberty HS, currently Jacqueline Kennedy Onassis High School.
- PS 90 (220 W 148th St., Central Harlem; later 217 W 147th St.); built in 1905, the building had been abandoned for several decades, but artistic graffiti transformed the fence and walls into a shrine honoring several deceased renowned African Americans. On April 4, 2008, the City deeded the property to "West 147th Associates LLC," a condominium entity created in 2004 by the developer. With little fanfare, the developer, L+M Development Partners Inc., commenced construction of mixed-income condominiums; the aim is to refurbish the original facade and keep the H-plan design intact. The building is now addressed 217 W 147th St.
- PS 95 (16 Clarkson St., Hudson Square); now HS 560 City As School
- PS 109 (215 E 99th St., East Harlem); National Register. Now El Barrio's ArtSpace PS 109, an affordable housing project for artists.
- PS 110 (285 Delancey St., Lower East Side)
- PS 150 (E 96th St.); later Hunter College Model School and Machine and Metal Trades HS, currently Life Sciences Secondary School
- PS 160 (107 Suffolk St., Lower East Side); now home to Clemente Soto Vélez Cultural and Educational Center
- PS 157 (327 St. Nicholas Ave.); National Register. Apartments since 1990, soon to convert into a co-op.
- PS 165 (234 W 109th St.); now housing selective middle school Mott Hall II (serving 6th through 8th grades) in addition to PS 165 Robert E. Simon School (serving pre-K through 8th grades)
- PS 166 (132 W 89th St.); NYC Landmark
- PS 168 (317 E 104th St.); now a community health facility
- PS 171 (19 E 103rd St.); built 1899, now PS/IS 171 Patrick Henry
- PS 186 (521 W 145th St., Hamilton Heights); in 1975, this structure was so dilapidated that parents held protests, and the city eventually moved to open a new school across the street. The Convent Avenue Baptist Church bought PS 186 in January 1986 with the intention of creating a new space for its M.L. Wilson Boys' Club (now Boys & Girls Club of Harlem, Inc.). Redeveloped into a residential complex in 2017 and listed on the National Register of Historic Places.

===== Queens =====
- PS 66 (85-11 102nd St., Richmond Hill); National Register

===== Staten Island =====
- PS 28 (276 Center St., Richmondtown); NYC Landmark. Now Richmondtown Historical Society.

==== High schools ====
===== The Bronx =====
- Morris High School (1110 Boston Rd.); NYC Landmark

===== Brooklyn =====
- Erasmus Hall High School (911 Flatbush Ave.); NYC Landmark

===== Manhattan =====
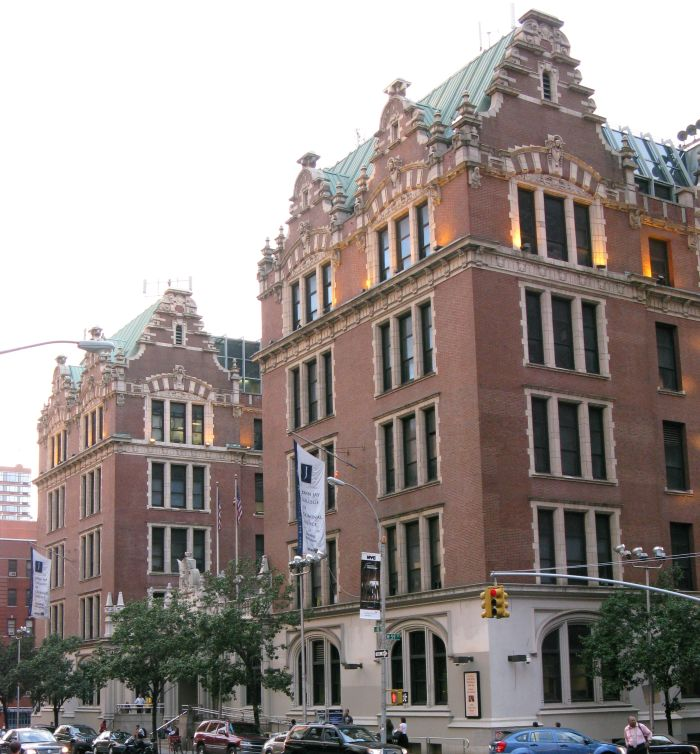
Haaren Hall in 2008

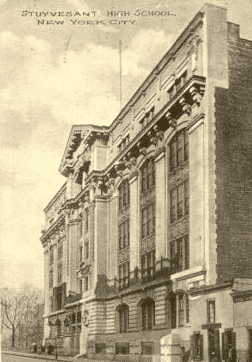
Postcard featuring the 15th Street facade of Snyder's Stuyvesant High School building

- Manhattan Trade School for Girls (127 E 22nd St.); now School of the Future
- Stuyvesant High School (345 E 15th St.); NYC Landmark. Served as the school's second home between 1907 and 1992.
- Washington Irving High School (40 Irving Pl.)
- DeWitt Clinton High School (899 10th Ave.); now Haaren Hall on the campus of John Jay College of Criminal Justice. It was the largest high school building in the United States when it opened in 1903. The interior has since been gutted.
- Wadleigh High School for Girls (215 W 114th St.); NYC Landmark. Later Wadleigh JHS.

===== Queens =====
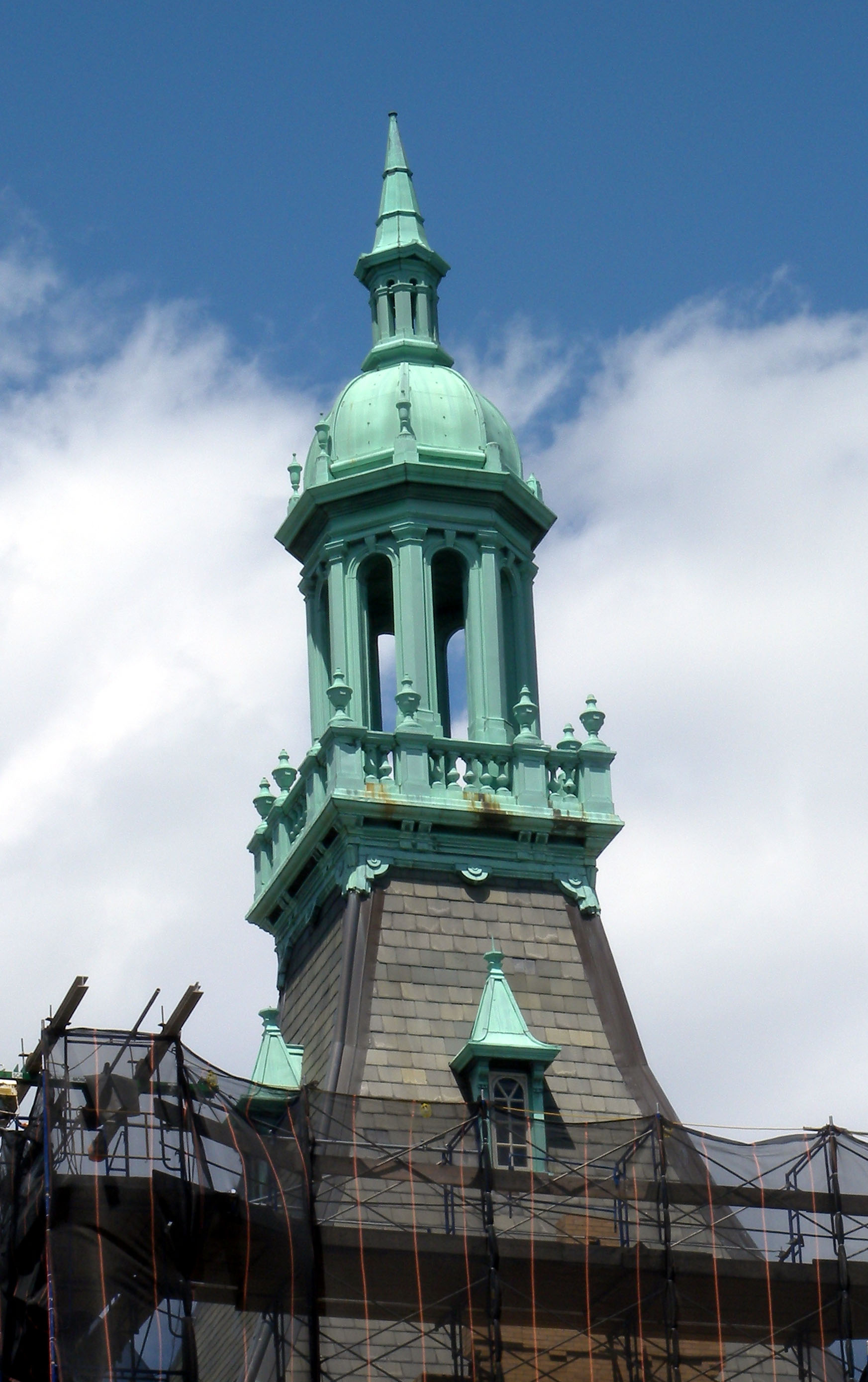
Newtown High School

- Newtown High School (48-01 90th St.); NYC Landmark
- Flushing High School (35-01 Union St.); NYC Landmark, National Register

===== Staten Island =====
- Curtis High School (105 Hamilton Ave.); NYC Landmark

==== Structural additions ====
===== Brooklyn =====
- Girls' High School (475 Nostrand Ave.; James W. Naughton, architect); addition completed in 1912.

===== Manhattan =====
- PS 72 (1674 Lexington Ave.; David I. Stagg, architect); NYC Landmark. Annex completed in 1924. Later PS 107; now Burgos Cultural Center.

===== Staten Island =====
- PS 4 (4210 Arthur Kill Rd., Tottenville); addition completed in 1907.

==== Demolished structures ====
===== The Bronx =====
- PS 19 (225 E. 234th St.); later Evander Childs High School Annex and the Resthaven Nursing Home
- PS 31 (425 Grand Concourse); former NYC Landmark

===== Manhattan =====
- PS 3 (490 Hudson St.)
- PS 6 (Madison Ave., between E 85th & 86th Sts., Upper East Side)
- High School of Commerce (Amsterdam Ave., between W 65th & 66th Sts.); built in 1900, demolished 1964

=== Professional affiliations ===
Snyder joined the American Society of Heating and Ventilating Engineers in 1895, served on its Board of Governors from 1900 to 1904, and was elected president in 1907. He joined the American Institute of Architects in 1901 and was elevated to Fellow in 1905.

=== Retirement ===
In 1922, Snyder began openly exploring retirement. He said that he hadn't had a vacation in 18 years and was tired and completely worn-out, and that he wished to "go fishing." On July 1, 1923, Snyder officially retired. He was succeeded by another noted school architect whom Snyder helped train: William H. Gompert.

== Personal life ==
Snyder married Harriet Katharine (or Katherine) de Vries (November 30, 1862 – May 25, 1927) on September 11, 1889, at the home of the bride's parents in Jersey City Heights. They had two sons, Howard Halsey Snyder (October 15, 1890 – March 1970) and Robert Maclay Snyder (September 6, 1894 – November 11, 1945).

== Death ==
Snyder died November 14, 1945, with his son, Robert, when they were overcome with natural gas poisoning in their cottage in Babylon, New York. Upon retiring for the evening, the Snyders had lit the burners on the range oven to heat the rooms, but during the night the flame had been extinguished, possibly by a draft. The elder Snyder was 85; his son was 51. Both are buried in a family plot in Woodlawn Cemetery in The Bronx, New York City.

== Publications and presentations ==
- Alfred Dwight Foster Hamlin; Charles B.J. Snyder (1910). Modern School Houses; a series of authoritative articles on planning, sanitation, heating and ventilation. The Swetland Publishing Co.
- Municipal Engineers of the City of New York (1905). Proceedings of the Municipal Engineers of The City of New York, 1904. The Society. p. 60.

== See also ==
- New York City Landmarks Preservation Commission
