= William H. Gompert =

William H. Gompert (1875 -1946) was the Architect and Superintendent of School Buildings for the New York City Board of Education. According to research published by the New York City Landmarks Preservation Commission, Gompert was educated at Adelphi Academy, Pratt Institute, and the Brooklyn Institute of Arts and Sciences. The Landmarks Commission report on Gompert was included in its study of its decision to grant landmark status to the building that once housed The High School of Music & Art. It states:

"After employment in the firms of McKim, Mead & White, Maynicke & Franke, and George Edward Harding & Gooch, he established his own practice around 1906 and specialized in the design of commercial and institutional buildings. He was elected president of the Brooklyn chapter of the American Institute of Architects in 1923. Gompert was hired in February 1923 by the New York City Board of Education as an expert to assist in the reorganization of the Bureau of Construction and Maintenance and to facilitate the construction of public schools; his initial six-month contract gave him the 'powers and duties of Superintendent of School Buildings.'

"According to The New York Times, Gompert had 'much experience in the directing of large building construction enterprises.' After a six-month extension of his contract, Gompert was appointed in January 1924 to the position of Architect and Superintendent of School Buildings for the Board of Education, and became the third-highest paid official in the administration of Mayor John Francis Hylan.

"Gompert was the first successor to the noted Charles B.J. Snyder, Superintendent of School Buildings from 1891 until January 1, 1923, who had been responsible for the vast school construction program following the consolidation of New York City in 1898, and had been 'virtually forced out of the post under pressure by. . . Mayor Hylan.'

"To alleviate the serious overcrowding in the schools caused by immigration after World War I, New York City undertook another extensive program of school construction in the mid-1920s. Gompert was forced to contend with a significant shortage of bricklayers in the citywide building industry, as well as a lack of interest on the part of major construction firms in bidding on public school construction projects. He attempted to bring about economy and change in the process of school construction, including standardizing design and construction, employing general contracts instead of individual construction contracts, and instituting double shifts to shorten construction time. In 1925, however, charges began to surface, first by a mayoral candidate, that many of the schools constructed under Gompert were defective. By the end of 1927, three separate investigations were underway and Gompert resigned in December. Former Mayor Hylan responded to critics that Gompert was under attack because he had 'built too many schools to suit those that do not want the children educated.'

"The Board of Education's Joint Committee of Architects and Engineers issued its report in 1928 and called Gompert's schools 'in general honest, safe, efficient and appropriate to the purpose.'

"In his nearly five years as school architect, Gompert was credited with overseeing the design and construction of some 170 new schools and additions, including The High School of Music & Art (in 1924), DeWitt Clinton High School and Theodore Roosevelt High School (1929), the Bronx; James Madison High School (1926), Brooklyn; and Jamaica High School (1927) and Far Rockaway High School (1929), Queens, in austere versions of such contemporary institutional styles as Collegiate Gothic, Georgian, and Spanish Colonial. The towered Public School 101 (1929), Forest Hills Gardens, has been considered Gompert's most stylistically interesting design."
