= Reliable-Dayton =

Defunct American motor vehicle manufacturer

Reliable Dayton Motor Car Company
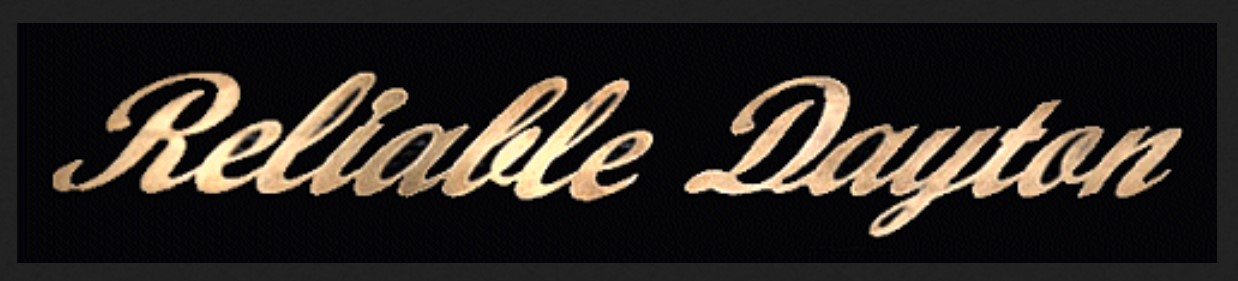
- 1909 Reliable Dayton radiator emblem

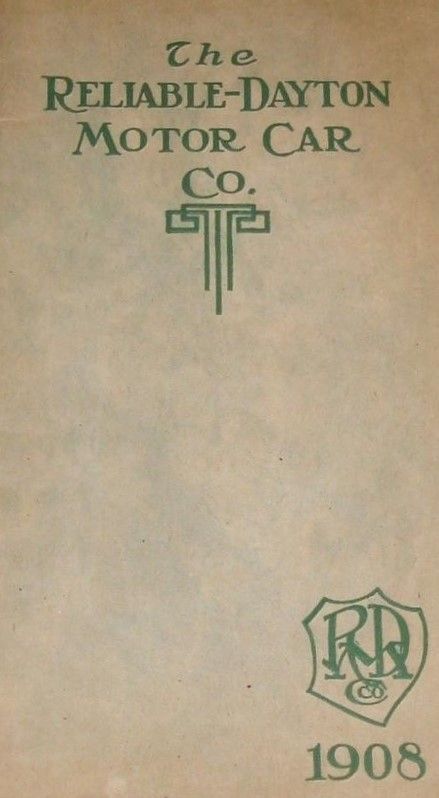
- Reliable Dayton 1908 brochure cover
- Industry: Automotive
- Founded: 1906; 120 years ago
- Founder: William O. Dayton
- Defunct: 1909; 117 years ago
- Fate: Sold factory to Fal-Car
- Headquarters: Chicago, Illinois, United States
- Production output: High wheeler (1906-1909)

The Reliable-Dayton was a High wheeler American automobile manufactured in Chicago, Illinois, from 1906 to 1909. The car was built in a factory that would later be the home of the Fal-Car.

== History ==
Reliable Dayton high-wheelers appeared in the spring of 1906 and William O. Dayton organized the Dayton Motor Car Company in the late fall. All engines for the Reliable Dayton were built at the Dayton & Mashey Automobile Works in Chicago which William Dayton also ran. The original engine was a two-stroke twin-cylinder 15-hp engine later changed to a four-stroke twin engine.

The high-wheelers had a rope drive and solid rubber tires, with the engine located under the seat. The first cars had a fin-tube radiator over the front axle, while later models had a Renault style hood in front housing the gasoline and water tanks. The cars were available as a surrey, runabout or an enclosed coupe. Prices in 1908 ranged from $780 for the runabout to $925 (equivalent to $33,146 in 2025) for the surrey, and to $1,200 for the coupe.

During 1909 the Reliable Dayton factory was taken over by the Fal Motor Company for production of the F.A.L. automobile. William O. Dayton, was also associated with the Matrix, Dayton, Crusader and New Era automobiles in Joliet, Illinois from 1912 to 1916.

== Gallery ==
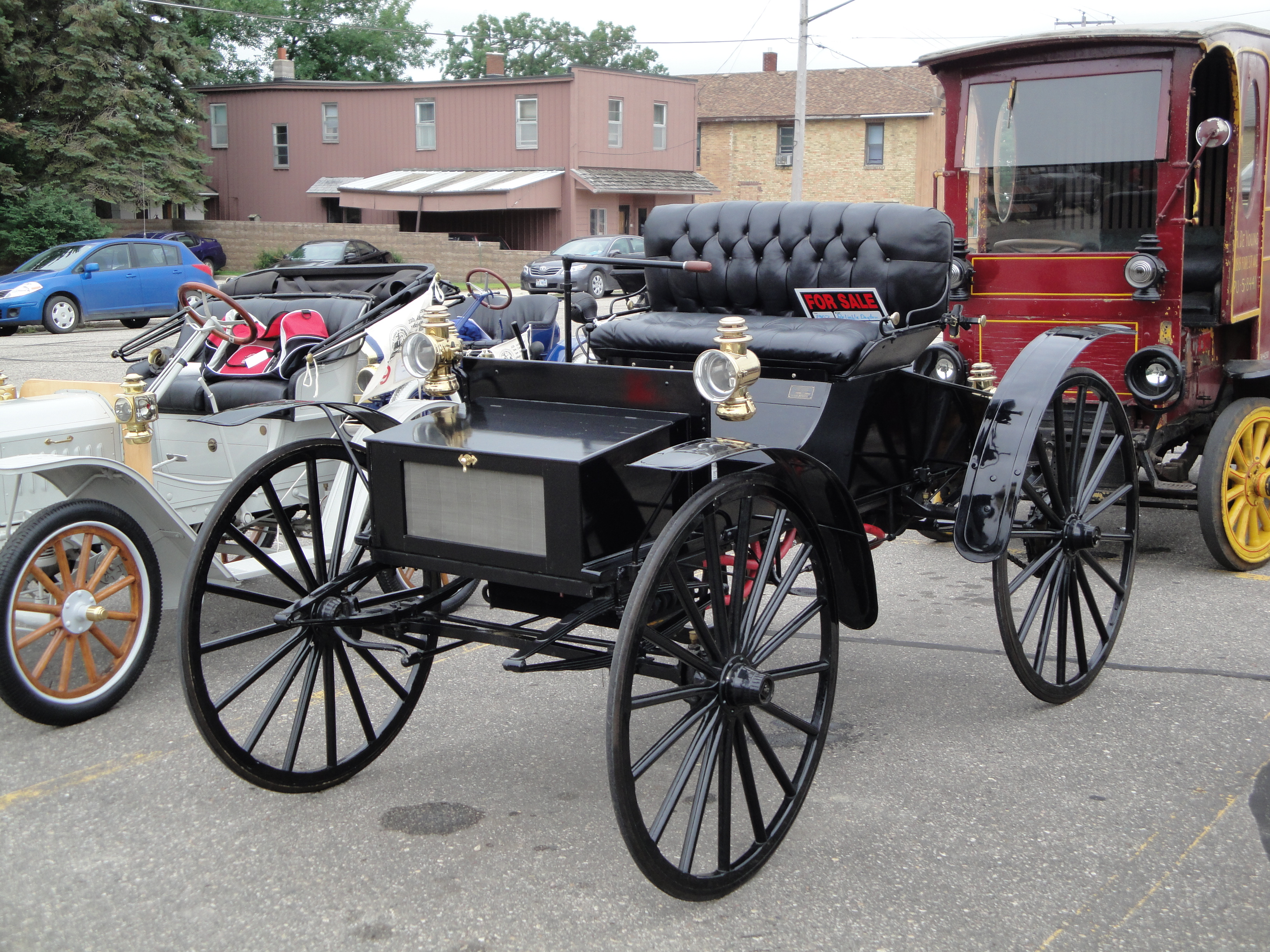
1907 Reliable Dayton

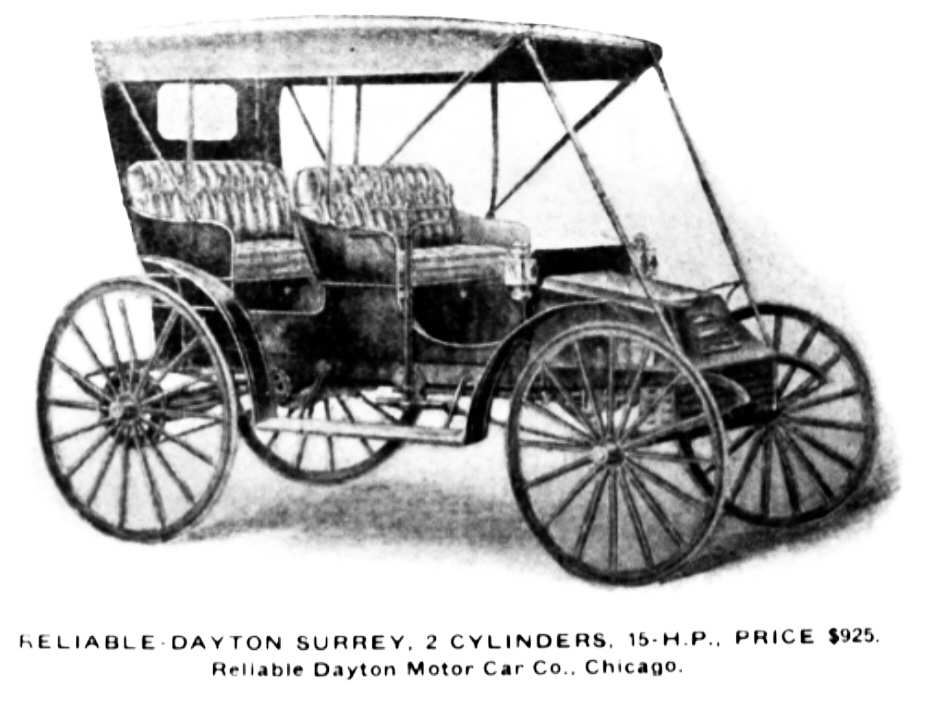
Reliable-Dayton Surrey (1908)

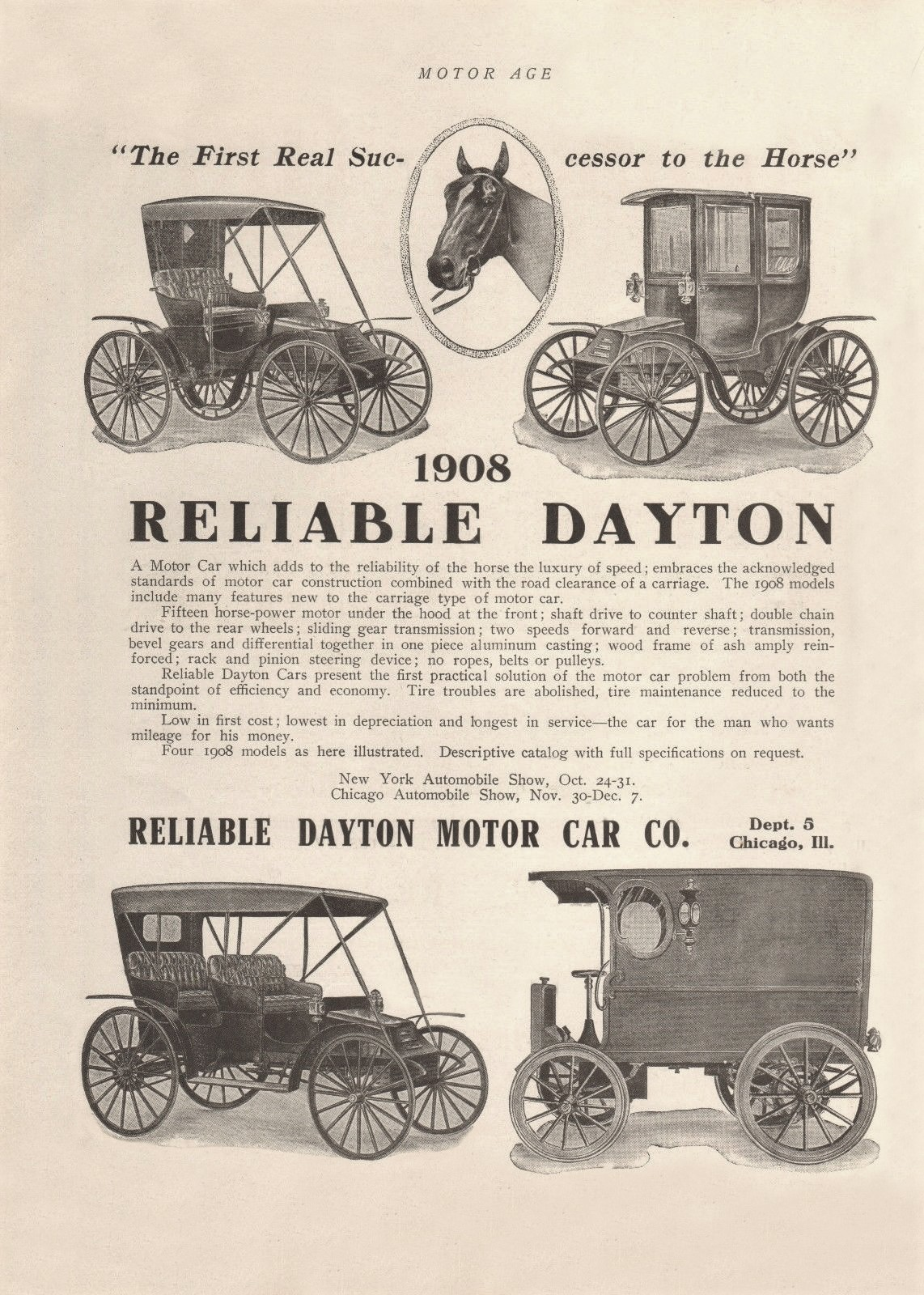
1908 Reliable Dayton advertisement in Motor Age magazine

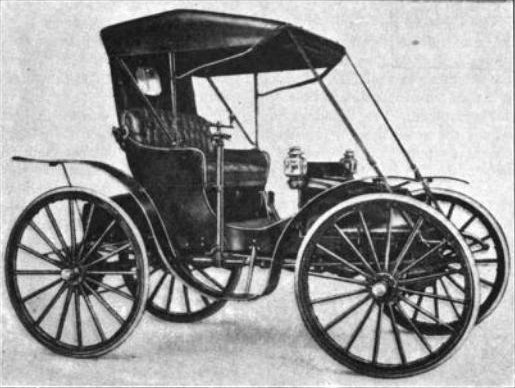
1909 Reliable Dayton from the American Blacksmith magazine

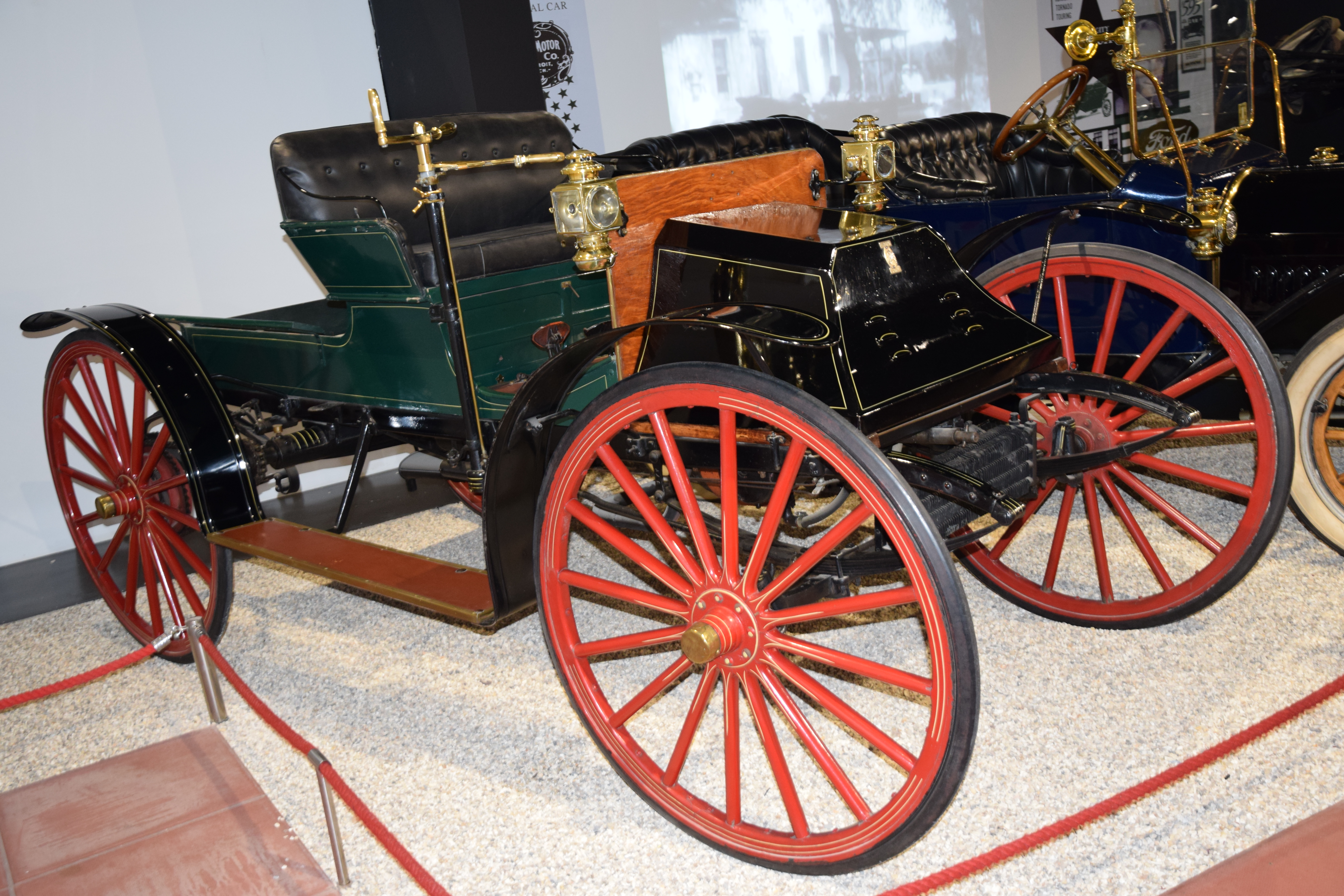
1909 Reliable Dayton at the Haynes International Motor Museum

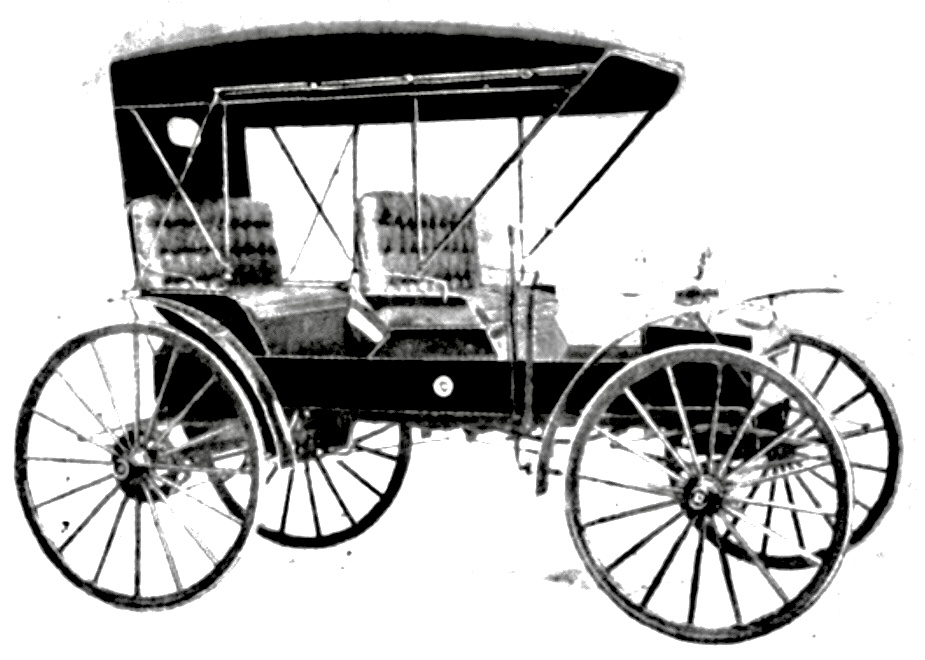
Reliable Dayton Model D (1907)

== See also ==
- 1909 Reliable Dayton Model F at ConceptCarz
- High wheeler
- Brass Era car
