= The American Architect =

American architecture magazine

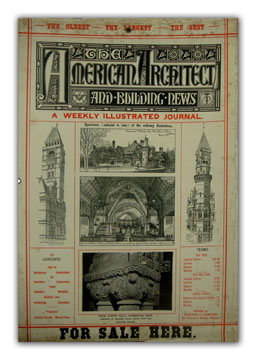
- The front cover of the publication c. 1883, during its time as The American Architect and Building News
- Categories: Architecture
- Frequency: Annually
- First issue: 1876
- Final issue: 1938 (88 years ago)
- Country: United States
- Language: English
- ISSN: 2155-3971
- OCLC: 8696571

The American Architect was a weekly periodical on architecture published between 1876 and 1938. Originally titled The American Architect and Building News, in 1909 the magazine changed its name to The American Architect. In 1921, it changed name again to The American Architect and the Architectural Review, the second part of the name being the serial it absorbed.

The magazine reverted to its original name in 1925, and was published for another thirteen years. Its final edition, volume 152, was published in 1938, when it was absorbed into Architectural Record.

The magazine was originally published by Ticknor and Company Publishers, based on Tremont Street in Boston, Massachusetts. It was later published by Swetland Publishing Company and Standard Publishing.
