= Superintendent of School Buildings, New York City =

School district in the U.S. state of New York

The Superintendent of Schools Buildings was a position assigned by the School Building Commission of the New York City Board of Education.

== BOE Superintendents of School Buildings ==
Brooklyn Board of Education (until 1898)

- 1859-1879 — Samuel B. Leonard
- 1879-1898 — James W. Naughton (b. approx 1840 - d. Feb. 12, 1898)

Public School Society of New York (until 1842)

- 1837-1872 — Amnon Macvey (d. 1872)

New York City Board of Education (1842-2002)

- 1872-1886 — David I. Stagg (b. 1816 Paterson, NJ - d. 1886)
- 1886-1891 — George W. Debevoise (1840-1919)
- 1891-1923 — Charles B. J. Snyder (1860-1945)
- 1923-1927 — William H. Gompert (1875-1946)
- 1928-1938 — Walter C. Martin
- 1940s — Thomas Duff
- 1950s — William F. Correale

(In 1898 New York City consolidated with Brooklyn, part of The Bronx, parts of Queens, and Staten Island)

== DOE Directors of Architecture ==
- 1963-1974 — Arthur G. Paletta (1909-1984) (appointed by the BOE Aug 8, 1963)

== School Architects ==
- 1938-1952 — Harold Eric Kebbon (1890-1964), designed 100 buildings for the NYC BOE.

== Building Commission ==
=== Past Chairmen ===
- 1890s — Robert Maclay (b. 1833 - d. July 28, 1898)
- 1920-1927 — John A. Ferguson, MD (b. 1870 Nova Scotia d. June 9, 1955 Ridgewood, NJ). He oversaw the construction of 243 elementary schools and 14 high schools.
- 1948-1961 — Charles J. Bensley (b. Dec. 25, 1907 - d. June 3, 1995) He oversaw about 325 school projects totaling about $900 million.
