= Public School 9 (historic building) =

Historic school in Manhattan, New York

- U.S. National Register of Historic Places
- New York State Register of Historic Places
- New York City Landmark
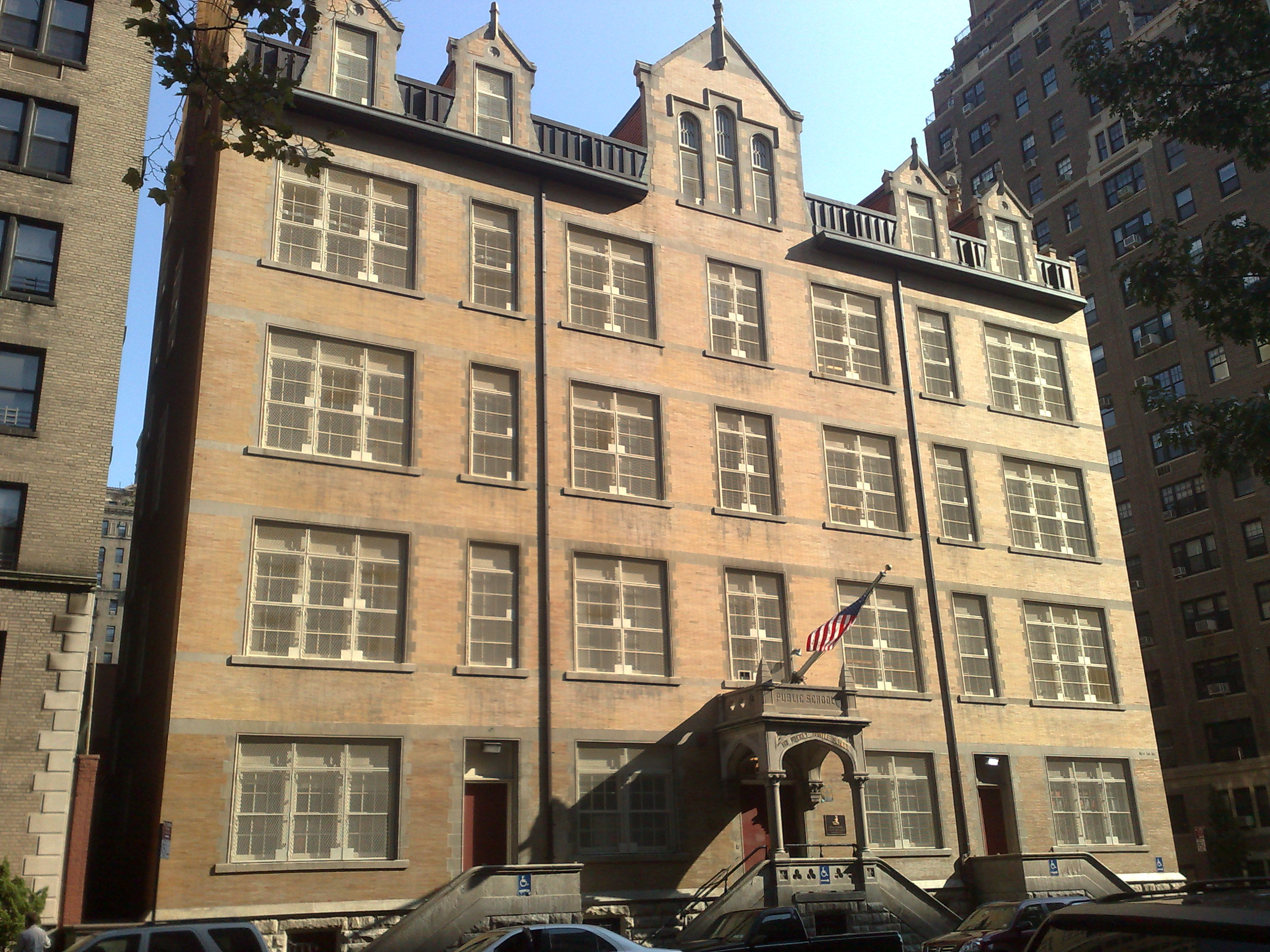
- (2008)

- Location within Manhattan Location within New York City Location within New York Location within the United States
- Location: 466 West End Avenue; Manhattan, New York City
- Coordinates: 40°47′11″N 73°58′46″W
- Built: 1894-96
- Architect: C. B. J. Snyder
- Architectural style: Gothic Revival
- NRHP reference No.: 87001258
- NYSRHP No.: 06101.001571
- NYCL No.: 2318

Significant dates
- Added to NRHP: August 3, 1987
- Designated NYSRHP: June 12, 1987
- Designated NYCL: July 14, 2009

Public School 9 (originally known as Grammar School 9, then later the John Jasper School and currently the Mickey Mantle School) is a historic school building at 466 West End Avenue at West 82nd Street on the Upper West Side of Manhattan, New York City. It was built in 1894-96, and was designed by C. B. J. Snyder, the Superintendent of School Buildings.

The building was listed on the U.S. National Register of Historic Places in 1987, and was designated a New York City landmark in 2009. It is located in the Riverside-West End Historic District Extension I.

== History ==
The school that became P.S. 9 was originally organized by the vestry of Saint Michael's Church (Episcopal) in the early 19th century. The vestry continued to operate the school in the Bloomingdale area until a law was enacted November 19, 1824 which barred church schools from receiving public school funding. On May 22, 1826, the Public School Society of New York acquired it; and, in July 1827, the Society paid $250 for a 100x100 foot tract at 82nd Street between 10th (Amsterdam) and 11th (West End) Avenues. On July 19, 1830, the Society completed the construction of a one-story clapboard school at 466 West End Avenue for $1,500, accommodating about 50 children. The Society transferred jurisdiction of the school to the Board of Education in July 1853.

In 1889, the New York Times published a letter to Mayor Hugh J. Grant citing the grim condition of the P.S. 9 building:

There was no visible plaster in the entire building. The wooden staircases and wood-lined stairways were only 29 inches wide. Large stoves and stovepipes beneath the stairs and elsewhere, used for warming the building, were dangerously close to the woodwork. The so-called passages were 30 inches wide. The building was devoid of any means of escape from the rear and devoid of a fire escape. Means of egress from the front was insufficient.

The next year (1890), the Board of Education demolished the building. From 1894-96, the Board erected a modern school building on the same site equipped with electricity and ventilation, and designed by C. B. J. Snyder. Designed to blend with the neighborhood, the ecclesiastical English gothic structure was a style prevalent in schools built by Trinity Church.

On January 26, 1916, during a graduation ceremony, P.S. 9 was named after the late John Jasper. Jasper was an educator who had served at P.S. 9 as a teacher in 1857 and as its principal from 1867 to 1897. He went on to become Assistant Superintendent of Schools then, in 1898, Borough Associate Superintendent of Schools for Manhattan and the Bronx.

In 1961, David H. Moskowitz, the Deputy Superintendent for Research and Evaluation for New York City Schools, reported a high transient rate at several elementary schools, including P.S. 9, which ranged from 90 to 99% during the 1959–1960 school year.

P.S. 9 moved to a newly constructed building on Columbus Avenue at West 84th Street in 1965. The former P.S. 9 building remained in the public school system. Since 2002, it has been the home of the Mickey Mantle School (P.S. 811M), serving children with disabilities.

== Notable people ==
- A. J. Liebling, born 1904
- Roy Lichtenstein, student in the 1930s
- Dick Morris, student in the 1950s
- Everett Raymond Kinstler, student in the mid 1930s
- Clara Gordon Bow, student in the Late 1910s and early 1920s. https://books.google.com/books?id=mm3gQqcl20UC&pg=PA11

== Gallery ==
Public School 9 (historic building)

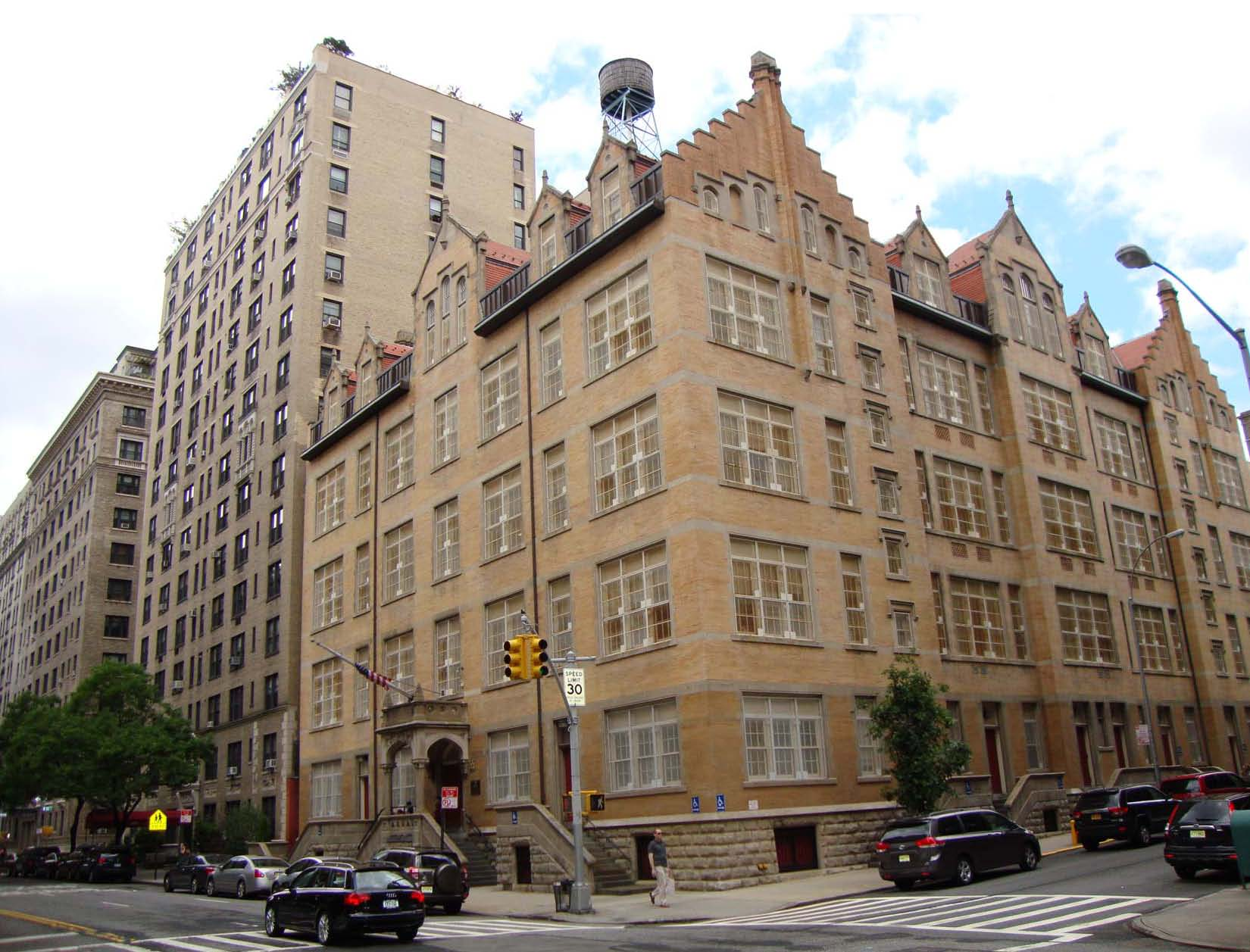
Full view, looking northeast

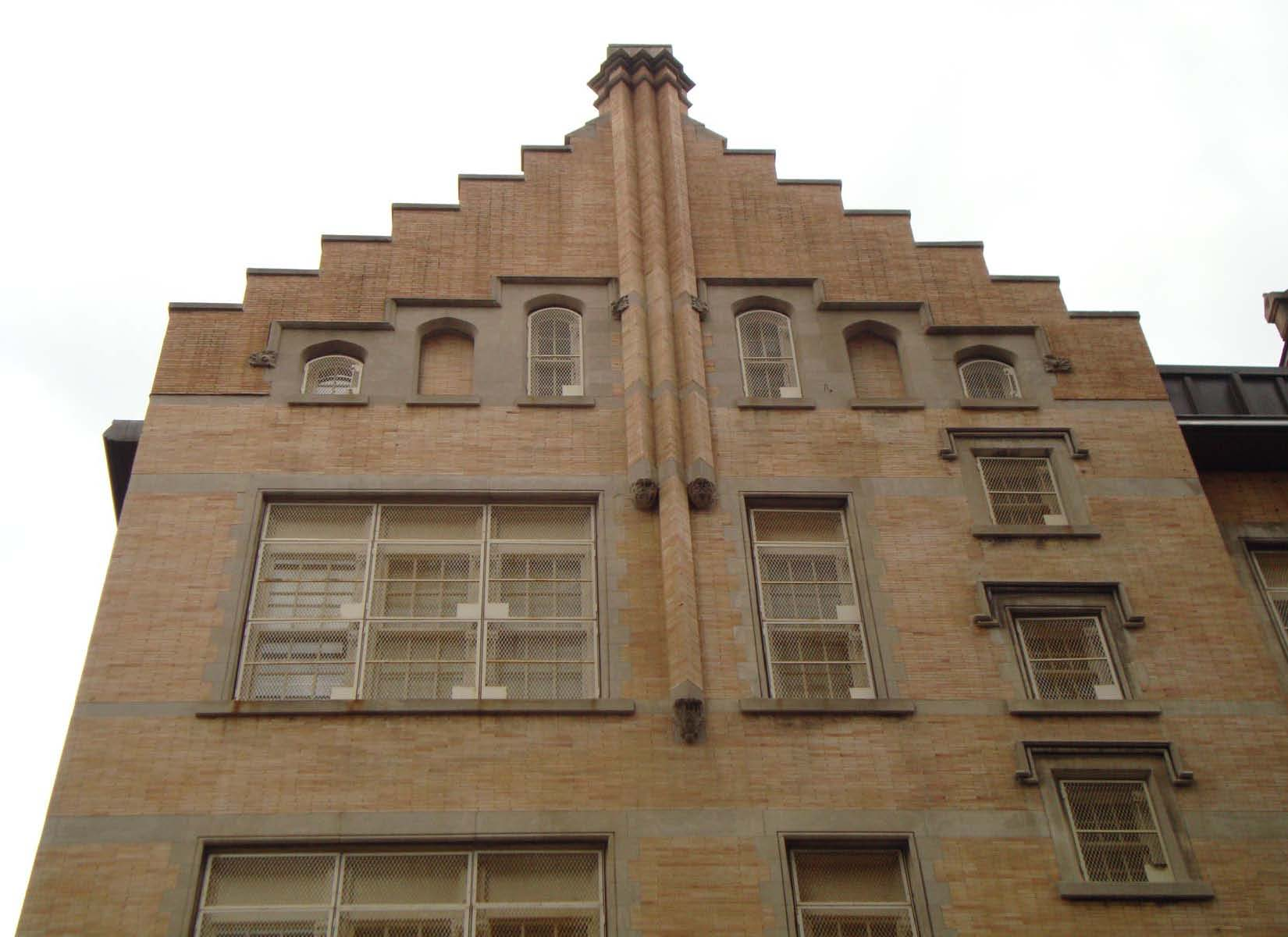
Top, looking north at the southwest corner

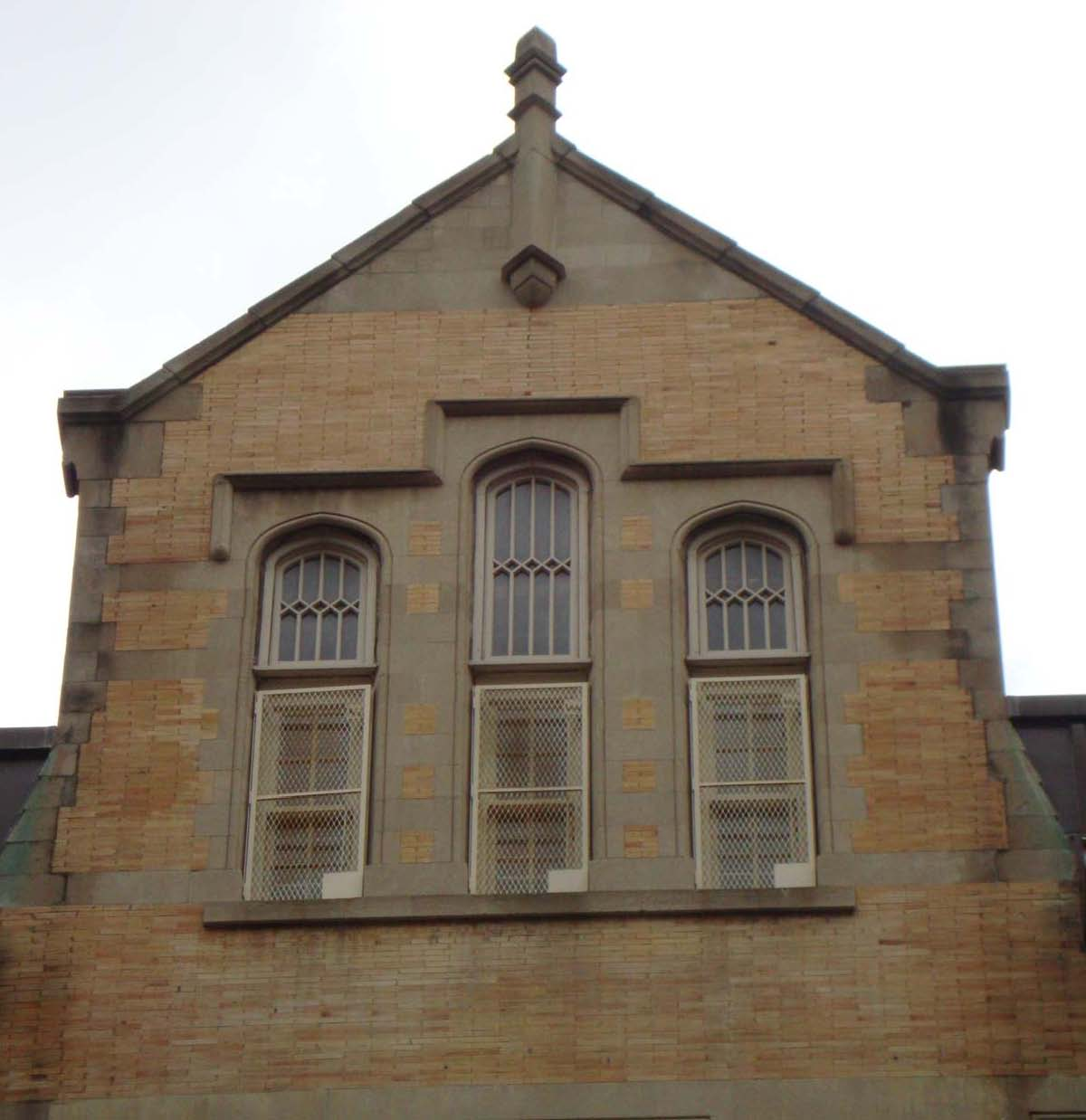
Top, looking east at the west side

== See also ==
- National Register of Historic Places listings in Manhattan from 59th to 110th Streets
- List of New York City Designated Landmarks in Manhattan from 59th to 110th Streets

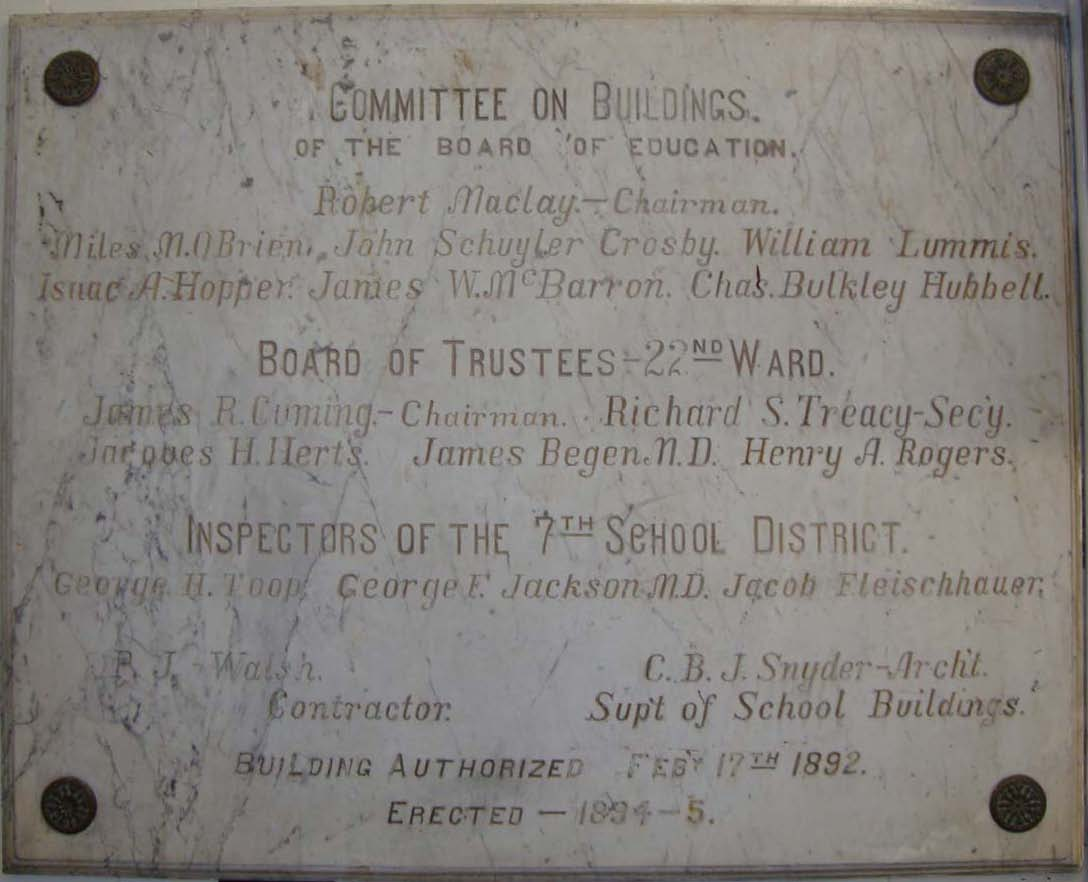
Dedication plaque
