= Swetland Publishing Company =

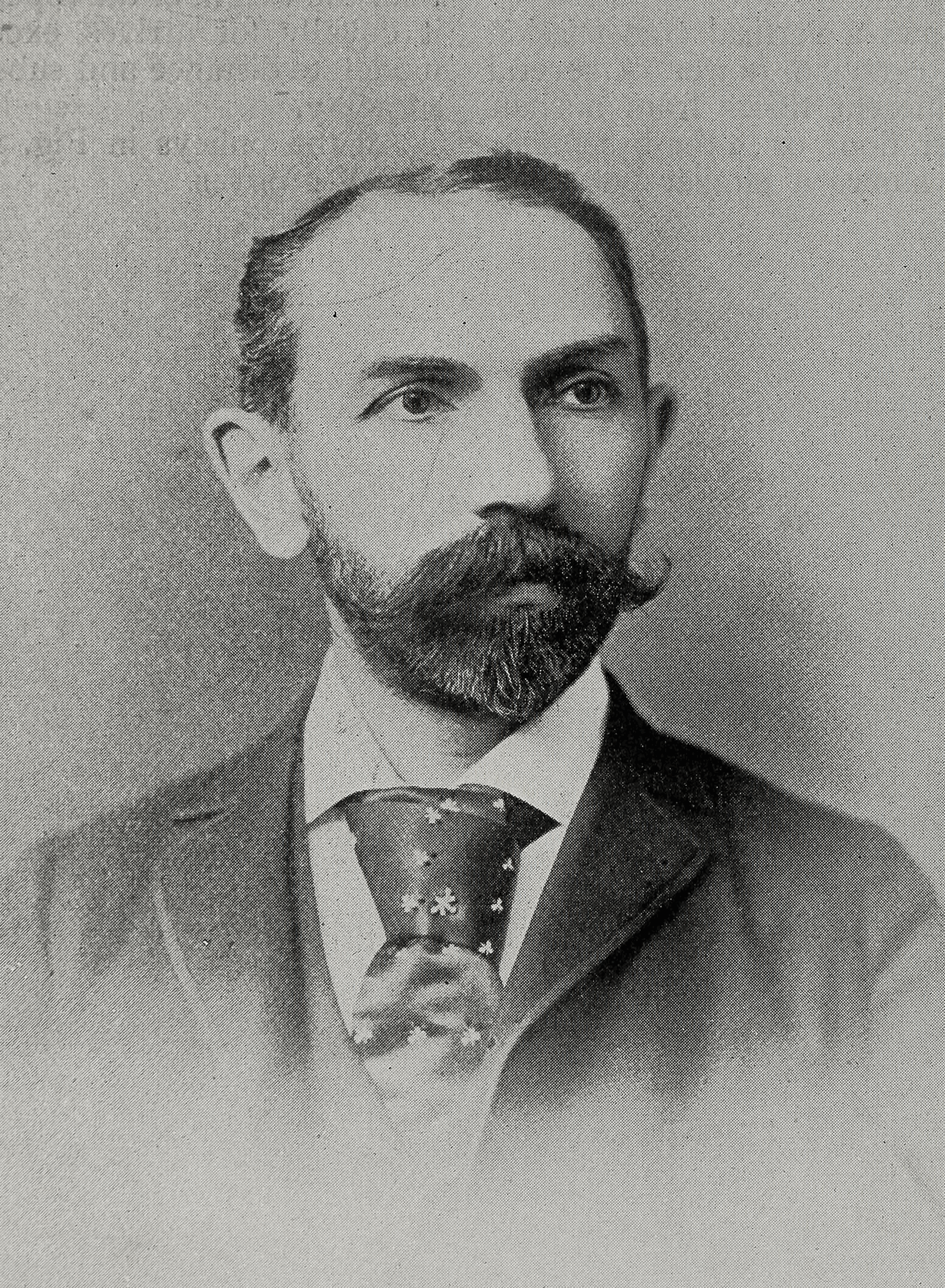
H.M. Swetland was portrayed by Cassier's Magazine in 1892. At that time he was president of the Power Publishing Company.

Swetland Publishing Company was founded in 1904 by Horace Monroe Swetland (1853–1924), an American entrepreneur who founded several publishing houses. Swetland Publishing Company owned The American Architect.

== Swetland's Architectural Journal ==
The American Architect and Building News (AABN) was a periodical on architecture and building published in the US during the late 19th and early 20th centuries.

- 1876 — The American Architect and Building News began publication.
- 1909 — AABN changed name to the American Architect (AA).
- 1921 — AA changed its name again to The American Architect and Architectural Review (AAAR), for a serial it absorbed.
- 1925 — AAAR changed its name back to The American Architect.
- 1938 — American Architect ceased publication because it was absorbed into the Architectural Record.

== Swetland publications mentioned in Wikipedia ==
1. Alfred Dwight Foster Hamlin; Charles B.J. Snyder (1910). Modern School Houses; a series of authoritative articles on planning, sanitation, heating and ventilation (PDF). The Swetland Publishing Co.
