= Alfred Dwight Foster Hamlin =

American architect

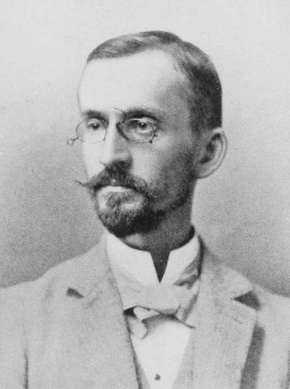
- Born: September 5, 1855; Constantinople, Ottoman Empire
- Died: March 21, 1926 (aged 70); New York, New York, US
- Education: Amherst College
- Occupation: Architect
- Spouse: Minnie Florence Marston (m. 1885)
- Children: 4
- Parents: Cyrus Hamlin (father); Harriet Martha Hamlin (mother)

Alfred Dwight Foster Hamlin, A.M., L.H.D. (September 5, 1855 – March 21, 1926) was an American architect.

== Biography ==
Alfred Dwight Foster Hamlin was born at Constantinople on September 5, 1855, the son of missionaries Cyrus Hamlin and Harriet Martha Hamlin. He graduated from Amherst in 1875, studied architecture in Boston and Paris, and afterward began teaching architecture at Columbia in its school of engineering. He was director from 1903 to 1912.

His relative, Hannibal Hamlin, was vice president of the United States under Abraham Lincoln, during the American Civil War.

He wrote many articles in the professional magazines and was the author of A Text-Book of the History of Architecture (1906). He was one of the men who collaborated to write European and Japanese Gardens (1902).

He married Minnie Florence Marston on June 4, 1885, and they had four children.

He was struck by a car while crossing Riverside Drive in Manhattan on the night of March 21, 1926, and died shortly after being brought to St. Luke's Hospital.

== Selected publications ==
- History of Architectural Styles (1893)
- In Memoriam: Cyrus Hamlin, Missionary (1903)
- A Text-Book of the History of Architecture (1906)
- Alfred Dwight Foster Hamlin; Charles B.J. Snyder (1910). Modern School Houses; a series of authoritative articles on planning, sanitation, heating and ventilation (PDF). The Swetland Publishing Co.
