= F.A.L. =

French automobile manufactured in 1907

The F.A.L. was a French automobile manufactured in 1907. A product of Saint-Cloud, the light car was built by Coll’habert et Sénéchal.
