= Wing (building) =

Subordinate section or feature of a building

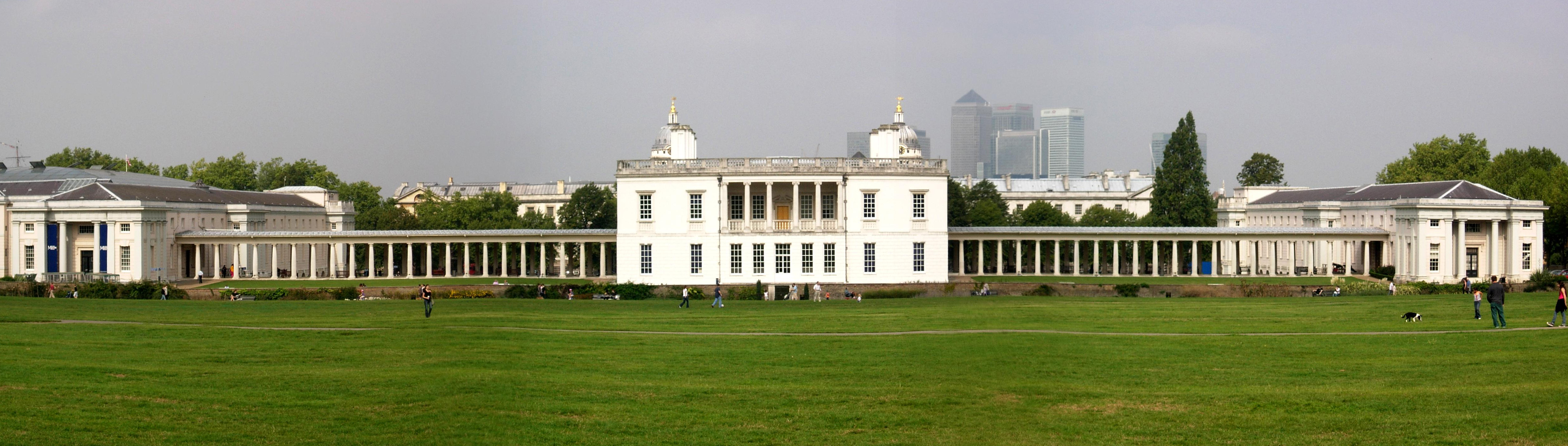
The Queen's House in Greenwich as viewed from the foot of Observatory Hill, showing the original 1635 house and the additional 1807 wings linked by colonnades

A wing is part of a building – or any feature of a building – that is subordinate to the main, central structure. The individual wings may directly adjoin the main building or may be built separately and joined to it by a connecting structure such as a colonnade or pergola. New buildings may incorporate wings from the outset or these may be added at a later date as part of an expansion or remodelling.

== History ==
In Classical and Palladian buildings, the wings are smaller buildings either side of the corps de logis and joined to it by quadrants or colonnades, partially projecting forward to form a court or cour d'honneur. They may also be an integral part of the principal block and be emphasised by any combination of a change in height, profile, colour, material, and ornament.

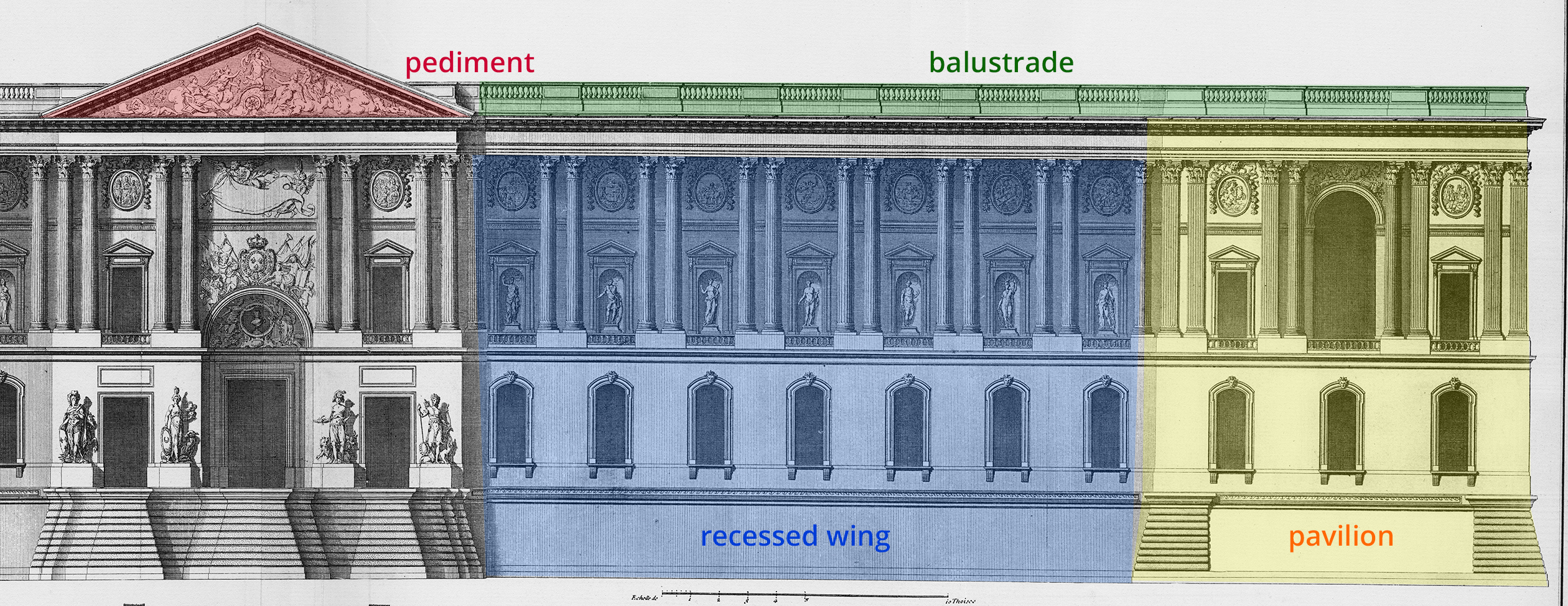
Illustration of the classical Louvre Colonnade in Paris with its recessed wing highlighted in blue

In medieval and early modern times, kings, princes and nobles upgraded their palaces, stately homes and villas in order to improve their outward appearance. The larger the building complex, the wealthier and more powerful the owner would seem to the beholder. The Palace of Versailles, the Lateran Palace in Rome and Sanssouci Palace in Potsdam are well known examples of a large number of particularly grand palaces or stately homes.

== Today ==
In modern architecture, wings are often found on public buildings as well as business premises. Wings may have special functions. For example, hospitals frequently have different wings each with separate functions. Wings may be named after their function (e.g. the Cardiac Wing of Great Ormond Street Hospital), their orientation (e.g. the East Wing of Somerset House, King's College, London) or a notable person (e.g. the Cavendish Wing of St Mary's Hospice, Ulverston). Wings create more window surface for more natural lighting and for safety-critical buildings such as laboratories, shorten escape routes, as opposed to monolithic structures of the same floor area.

View of the Palace of Versailles
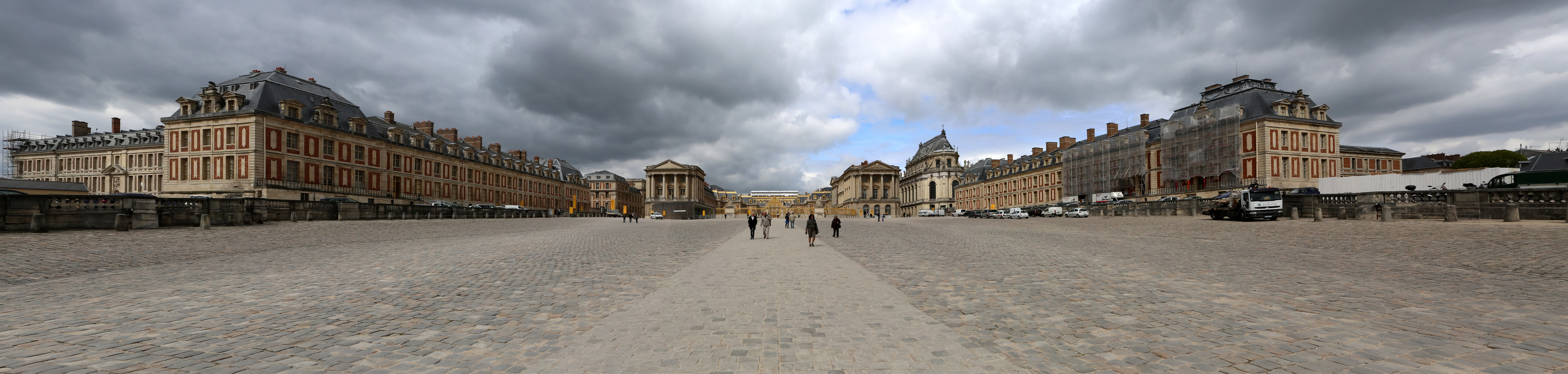
Panoramic view from the city

== Literature ==
- Pevsner, Honour, Fleming: Lexikon der Weltarchitektur, 2nd edn., 1987, Prestel-Verlag, ISBN 3-7913-0652-9.
