= LeMoyne Normal Institute =

Defunct school in Memphis, Tennessee

Coordinates: 35.1192°N 90.0357°W

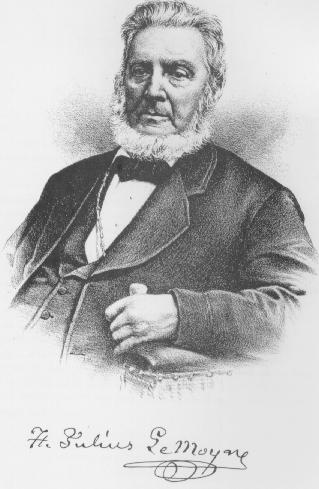
Francis Julius LeMoyne, namesake of the school ca 1860

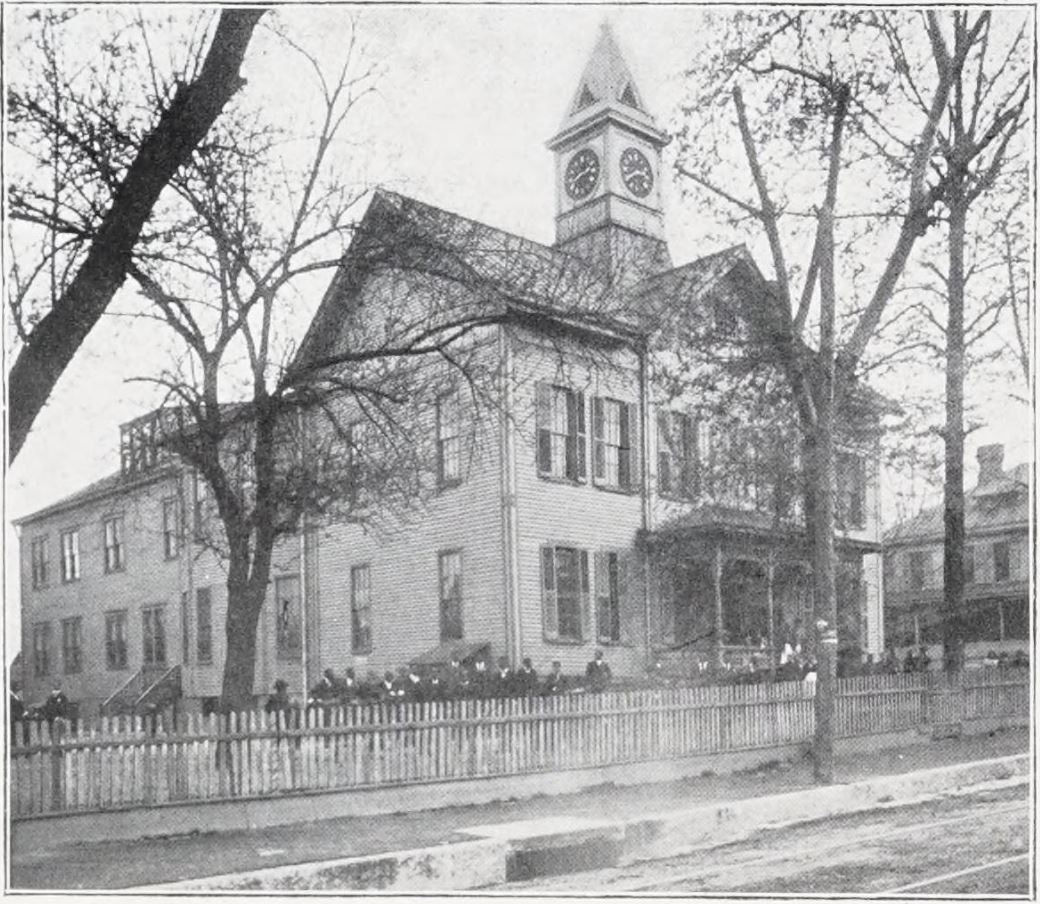
The school c. 1910

LeMoyne Normal Institute was a school for African Americans in Memphis, Tennessee. Alumni include Bert M. Roddy. It was a predecessor to LeMoyne-Owen College.

LeMoyne Normal and Commercial School was founded in 1862 when the American Missionary Association (AMA) sent Lucinda Humphrey to open an elementary school at Camp Shiloh (Tennessee) for free blacks and escaped slaves. This was one of more than ten schools founded by the AMA, an integrated organization led by black and white Congregational, Methodist and Presbyterian ministers. In 1909 it was located at 240 South Orleans.

The school was established soon after the occupation of Memphis by Federal troops during the Civil War. The soldiers were based at Camp Shiloh to the south of the city limits. First known as Lincoln Chapel, the school was relocated into Memphis proper in 1863. In 1866 it was destroyed during the 1866 riots by white residents of Memphis that broke out following the withdrawal of federal troops. The school was rebuilt and reopened in 1867 with 150 students and six teachers.

In 1870, Francis Julius LeMoyne (1798-1879), a Washington, Pennsylvania doctor, donated $20,000 to the American Missionary Association to build an elementary and secondary school for prospective teachers. LeMoyne, who was a notable abolitionist, traveled from his Pennsylvania home to visit the new school. He donated a clock for the school's tower.

Following a yellow fever epidemic in 1873 that hit Memphis and the school hard, its third principal, Andrew J. Steele, oversaw three decades of growth and development.

In 1895 the minister at the institute was Reverend George V. Clark, of Atlanta, GA. He was a graduate of Atlanta University and Howard University. Professor Andrew J. Steel, of Whitewater, WI was serving as principal.

In 1914 the school moved from Orleans Street to its present site on Walker Avenue. Steele Hall, the first building on the new campus, was erected that same year. LeMoyne became a junior college in 1924. After developing a four-year curriculum, it became a four-year college in 1930.

== Alumni ==
- Green Polonius Hamilton
