= LeMoyne–Owen College =

Historically black college in Memphis, Tennessee, US

- Former names: LeMoyne College; Owen College
- Motto: "Gubernatio. Opportunitas. Inclino."
- Motto in English: "Leadership. Opportunity. Change."
- Type: Private, HBCU
- Established: 1968; 58 years ago LeMoyne College – 1871; Owen College – 1947
- Religious affiliation: United Church of Christ
- Endowment: $52 million (2020)
- President: Christopher B. Davis (interim)
- Students: 646 (2023)
- Location: Memphis, Tennessee, United States; 35.12175°N 90.03495°W
- Campus: Urban
- Colors: Purple and Gold
- Nickname: Magicians
- Sporting affiliations: NCAA Division II – SIAC
- Website: loc.edu

LeMoyne–Owen College (LOC or "LeMoyne-Owen") is a private historically black college affiliated with the United Church of Christ and located in Memphis, Tennessee. It resulted from the 1968 merger of historically black colleges and other schools established by northern Protestant missions during and after the American Civil War.

== History ==
LeMoyne Normal and Commercial School was founded in 1862, when the American Missionary Association (AMA) sent Lucinda Humphrey to open an elementary school at Camp Shiloh (Tennessee) for free blacks and escaped slaves. This was one of more than ten schools founded by the AMA, an integrated organization led by black and white Congregational, Methodist and Presbyterian ministers.

The school was established soon after the occupation of Memphis by Federal troops during the Civil War; they were based at Camp Shiloh outside the city limits to the south. First known as Lincoln Chapel, the school relocated into Memphis proper in 1863 from south of the city. In 1866, it was destroyed during white race riots that broke out following the withdrawal of federal troops.

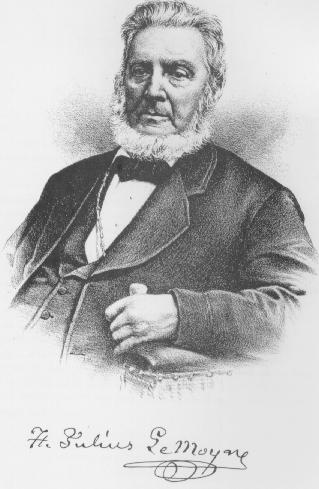
Francis Julius LeMoyne ca 1860

The school was rebuilt, and in 1867 it reopened with 150 students and six teachers. In 1870, Francis Julius LeMoyne (1798–1879), a Washington, Pennsylvania doctor, donated $20,000 (~$448,626 in 2025) to the American Missionary Association to build an elementary and secondary school for prospective teachers. LeMoyne, who was a notable abolitionist, traveled from his Pennsylvania home to visit the new school. He donated a clock for the school's tower. In 1871, the school opened in a new building at 284 Orleans Street and was named LeMoyne Normal and Commercial School.

The Memphis yellow fever epidemic started in 1873 and took a toll on many school personnel.

Under the leadership of the third principal, Andrew J. Steele, the school enjoyed three decades of growth and development.

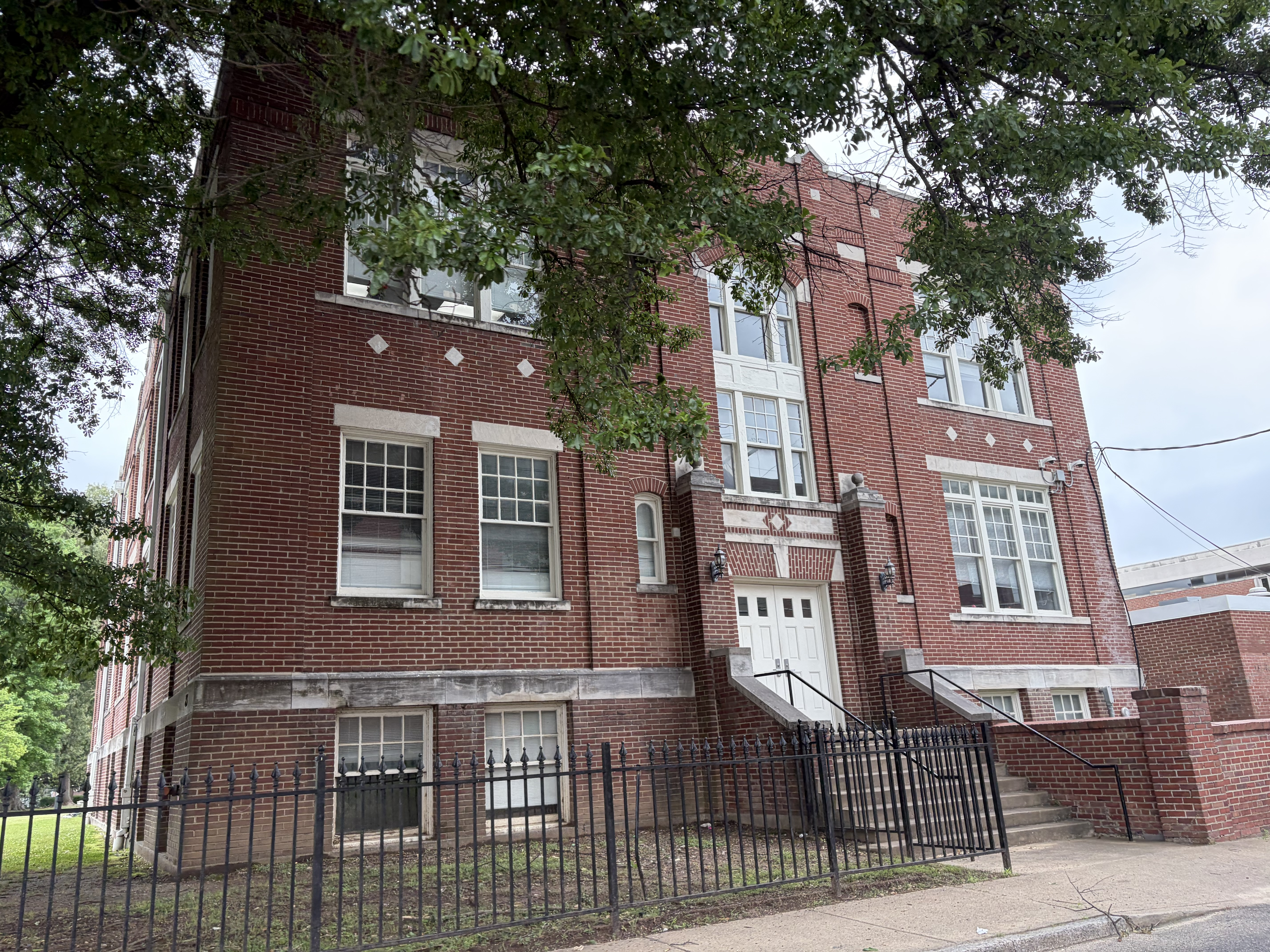
Steele Hall

In 1914 the school moved from Orleans Street to its present site on Walker Avenue. Steele Hall, the first building on the new campus, was erected that same year. LeMoyne became a junior college in 1924. After developing a four-year curriculum, it became a four-year college in 1930. The LeMoyne College was chartered by the State of Tennessee four years later. Steele Hall was listed on the National Register of Historic Places in 1979, and the core of the college's campus was listed on the National Register in 2005.

Owen College was established as a junior college in 1947, when the Tennessee Baptist Missionary and Educational Convention bought property for that purpose on Vance Avenue. After they developed the facility, S. A. Owen Junior College opened at that location in 1954.

LeMoyne–Owen College was formed through the 1968 merger of LeMoyne College and Owen College, both private, historically black, church-affiliated colleges.

In 2007, LeMoyne-Owen had management and accreditation problems due to a lack of financial resources. The Southern Association of Colleges and Schools placed the college on probation for two years. In August 2007, the City of Memphis ensured the college would open for the fall 2007 semester by pledging $3 million in taxpayer funds to be added to other substantial pledges from the United Negro College Fund, Cummins, radio host Tom Joyner and the United Church of Christ. The donation pledge, approved by the City Council, aroused controversy. City councilmembers defended their actions as contributing to the city and its residents. The college's president Johnnie B. Watson said that the college has reaffirmed its accreditation. It had increased its endowment to 20 million dollars in 2014.

In July 2020, LeMoyne-Ownen College received the largest donation in its history. A $40 million pledge from the Community Foundation of Greater Memphis quadrupled the college's endowment. LeMoyne-Ownen's president called the gift "transformative" for all that the college does and can do. The Community Foundation will give approximately $2 million annually.

== Historic district ==
- LeMoyne College Historic District
- U.S. National Register of Historic Places
- Location within Tennessee Location within the United States
- Location: Roughly bounded by Walker, Hollis Price, Crown and alley to rear of Sweeney Hall, Memphis, Tennessee
- Coordinates: 35°07′15″N 90°02′05″W
- Area: 4 acres (1.6 ha)
- Built: 1914
- Architects: George Awsumb; Tandy & Foster
- Architectural style: Colonial Revival, Modernist
- NRHP reference No.: 05001215
- Added to NRHP: November 9, 2005

The LeMoyne College Historic District is a historic district which was listed on the National Register of Historic Places in 2005. It includes four contributing buildings and the 1936 campus quadrangle as a contributing site. It is roughly bounded by Walker, Hollis Price, Crown and alley to rear of Sweeney Hall.

It includes Steel Hall, built in 1914, the oldest and original building on this campus, which was designed by Tandy & Foster and is separately listed on the National Register. It includes two Colonial Revival buildings, Brownlee and Sweeney halls, which were designed by George Awsumb along with the quadrangle in 1936. Sweeney Hall is named for Frank J. Sweeney, college president during 1929–1942, and originally served as the president's residence.

It includes the three-story Modernist-style Hollis F. Price Library, built in 1963, designed by architects Gassner-Nathan-Browne, named for Hollis F. Price, college president during 1943–1970.

== Athletics ==
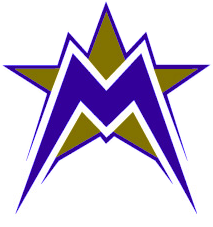
Logo of the LeMoyne–Owen Magicians

The college sponsors athletic teams (nicknamed Magicians) that participate at the Division II level, in the Southern Intercollegiate Athletic Conference (SIAC) of the National Collegiate Athletic Association (NCAA). The LeMoyne–Owen College Department of Athletics sponsors men's intercollegiate baseball, basketball, cross country, golf, and tennis along with women's intercollegiate softball, basketball, cross country, volleyball and tennis. Men's volleyball was added in the 2025 season (2024–25 school year).

In 1975, the LeMoyne–Owen College men's basketball team won the NCAA Men's Division III Basketball Championship. The school was then a member of the Division III level of the NCAA. Up to this day, LeMoyne-Owen has been the only HBCU to win a national championship at that level.

LeMoyne–Owen College golfer Dominique Worthen was the first player in SIAC history to win the SIAC Player of the Year award, earn a selection to the All Conference Team, and earn the SIAC Conference Championship MVP award, and an All Tournament First Team award, all in one week. Worthen of LeMoyne-Owen also won the 2015 PGA Minority Collegiate Championship.

== Notable alumni ==
Name	Lifespan	Year	Notability	Referencing
Lloyd Barbee	1925-2002	1949	Wisconsin legislator and civil rights activist	
Marion Barry	1936-2014	1958	former mayor of Washington, D.C. and former Washington, D.C. City Council member	
Henry Clifford Boles	1910-1979	1927	architect	
Annie Marie Watkins Garraway	1940-	1958 (Note: Graduated from S. A. Owen Junior College, which was later incorporated into LeMoyne–Owen College)	Mathematician who worked in telecommunications and electronic data transmission and philanthropist	
W. W. Herenton	1940-		former mayor of Memphis, Tennessee from 1992 until his resignation in 2009	
Benjamin Hooks	1925-2010	1943	former executive director of NAACP	
Ira Latimer	1906-1985		Taught at LeMoyne before becoming a lawyer and civil rights activist in Chicago	
Myron Lowery			former mayor pro-tem of Memphis, Tennessee from July 31, 2009 – October 26, 2009	
Andrea Lewis Miller			12th president of LeMoyne–Owen College	
Larry Robinson			Current President at Florida A&M University in Tallahassee, Florida	
Bert Maynard Roddy	1886-1963	1910	Memphis businessman and civil rights organizer	

== List of presidents ==
- Johnnie B. Watson
- Andrea Lewis Miller (2015–2019) first female and second alumnus
- Carol Johnson-Dean (2019–2021) interim
- Vernell Bennett-Fairs

== See also ==
- National Register of Historic Places listings in Shelby County, Tennessee
