= Ivey Delph Apartments =

- U.S. National Register of Historic Places
- U.S. Historic district – Contributing property
- New York State Register of Historic Places
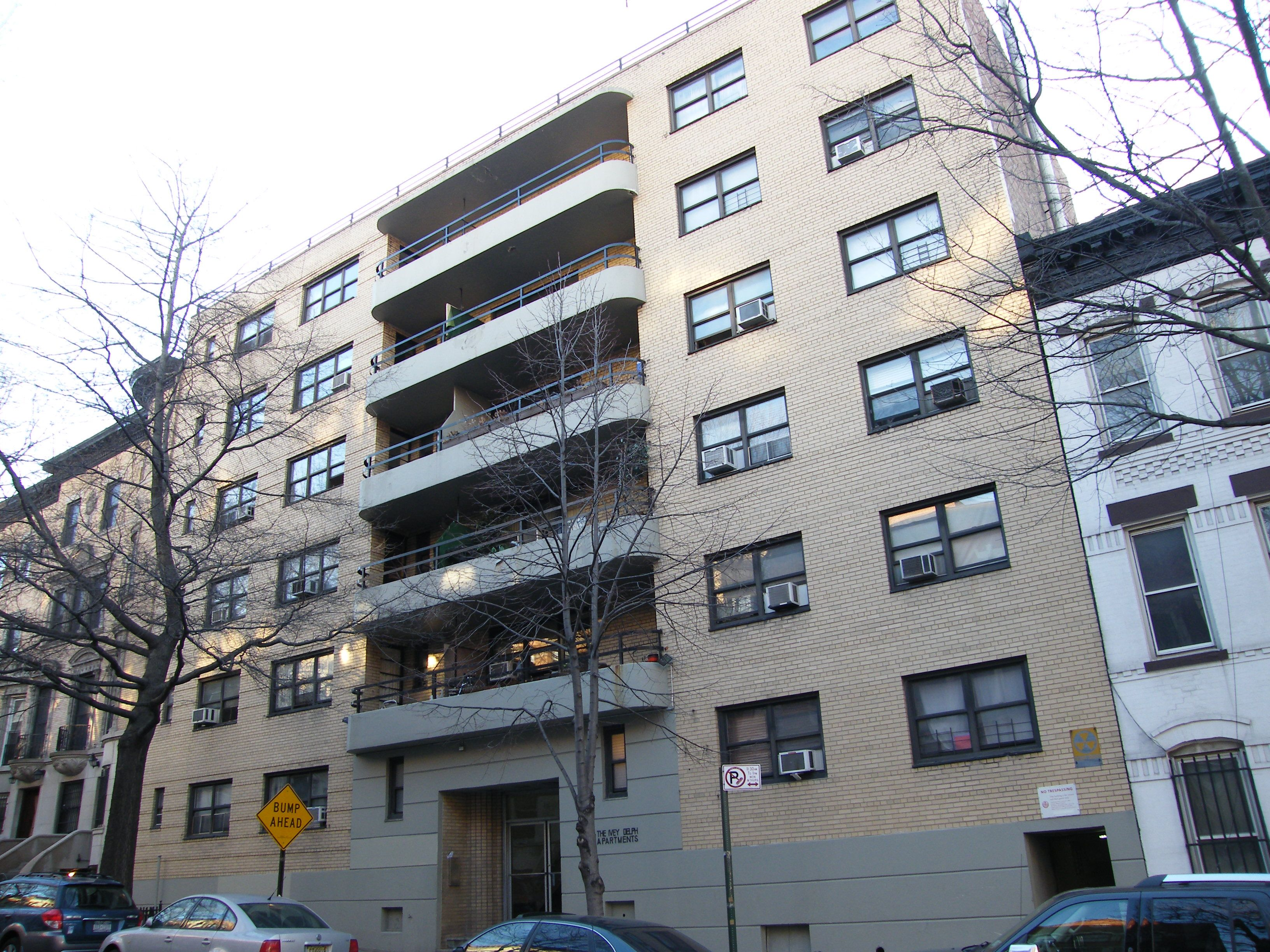
- Ivey Delph Apartments, March 2009

- Location within New York City Location within New York Location within the United States
- Location: 17-19 Hamilton Terrace, New York, New York
- Coordinates: 40°49′20″N 73°56′50″W
- Area: less than one acre
- Built: 1948
- Architect: Vertner Tandy
- Architectural style: Moderne
- Part of: Hamilton Heights Historic District (ID83001727)
- NRHP reference No.: 04001531
- NYSRHP No.: 06101.015038

Significant dates
- Added to NRHP: January 20, 2005
- Designated NYSRHP: November 22, 2004

Ivey Delph Apartments is a historic apartment building in Hamilton Heights, Manhattan, New York City. It was designed by noted African American architect Vertner Woodson Tandy (1885 – 1949) in 1948 and completed in 1951. It is a six-story, beige brick and concrete building in the Moderne style. It is a three bay wide building and the center bay features projecting balconies with curved ends and topped by curved iron railings with two horizontal bars. It is located within the Hamilton Heights Historic District.

It was listed on the National Register of Historic Places in 2005.
