= G. P. Hamilton =

G. P. Hamilton may refer to:

- Gilbert P. Hamilton, English-American film company executive
- Green Polonius Hamilton, African-American educator and author
