= George Shields =

George Shields may refer to:

- George Shields (politician), Australian politician
- George Oliver Shields, American writer and conservationist
- George Sylvester Shields, Canadian politician
- George Shields, character in Allotment Wives

== See also ==
- George Shiels (1881–1949), Irish dramatist
- George F. Shiels (1863–1943), surgeon and Medal of Honor recipient
- George Shield (1876–1935), British politician
