= Steele Hall (Memphis, Tennessee) =

- U.S. National Register of Historic Places
- U.S. Historic district – Contributing property
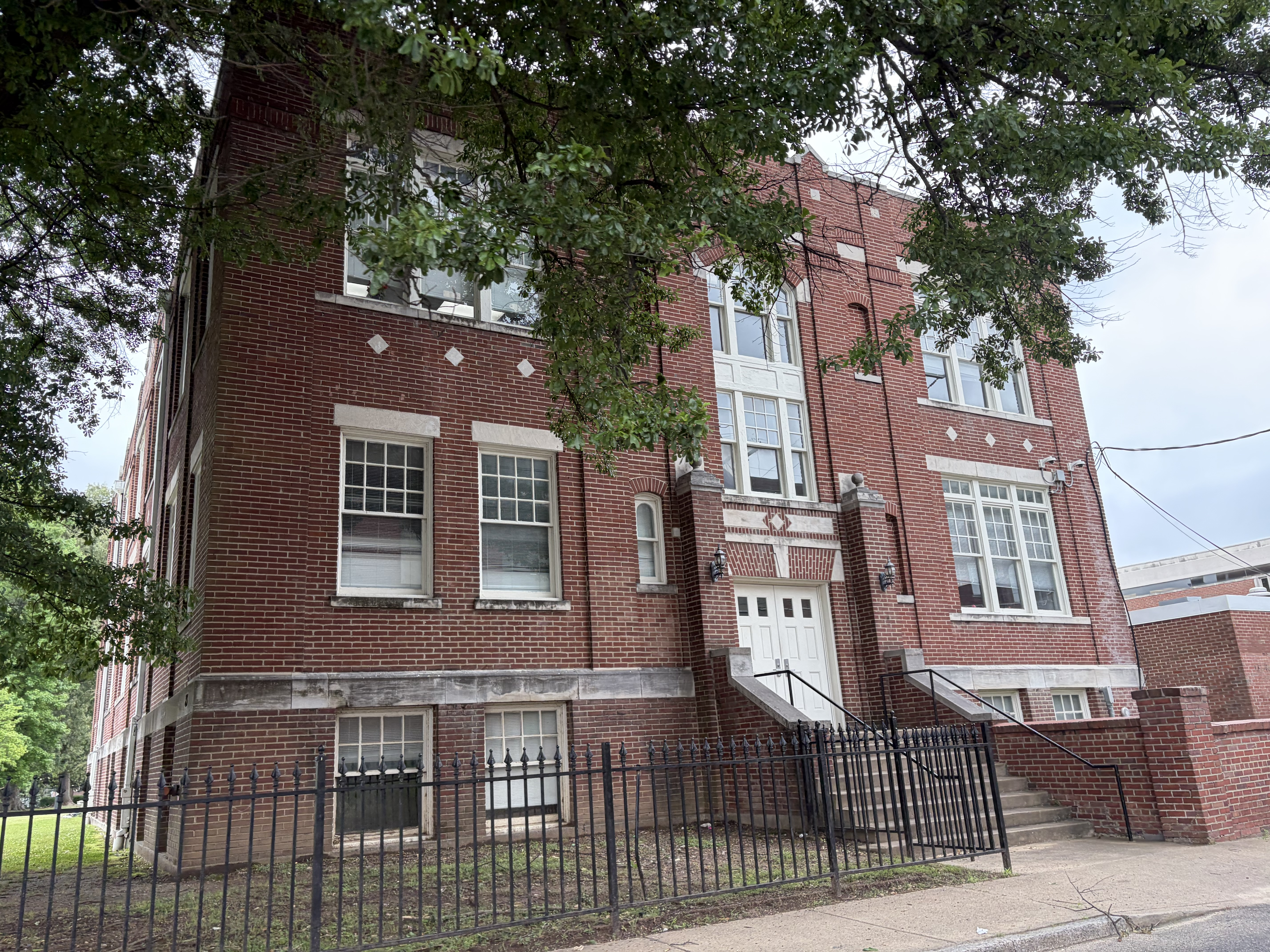
- Steele Hall in 2026

- Location within Tennessee Location within the United States
- Location: LeMoyne-Owen College campus, Memphis, Tennessee
- Coordinates: 35°07′09″N 90°02′09″W
- Area: 1.9 acres (0.77 ha)
- Built: 1914
- Architect: Tandy & Foster
- Part of: LeMoyne College Historic District (ID05001215)
- NRHP reference No.: 79002481

Significant dates
- Added to NRHP: March 23, 1979
- Designated CP: November 9, 2005

Steele Hall, on the campus of LeMoyne-Owen College in Memphis, Tennessee, is a historic building built in 1914. It is the oldest building on campus. It was designed by architects Tandy & Foster.

It is a two-story brick building upon a full basement with all three floors used for academic purposes. It was built on a limited budget, originally costing $32,000, and "has no architectural pretentions."

It was listed on the National Register of Historic Places in 1979. It also is included in the LeMoyne College Historic District, also on the National Register.
