= Booker T. Washington High School (Tennessee) =

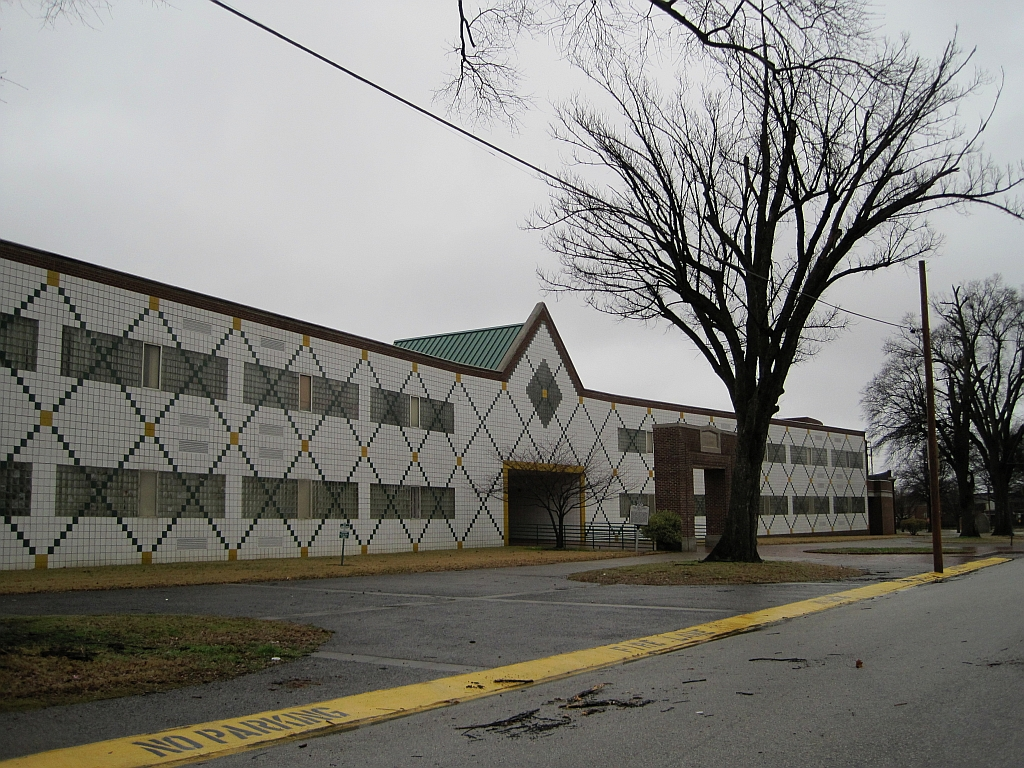
- Eastern facade with main entrance from South Lauderdale Street

Location
- 715 South Lauderdale Street; Memphis, Tennessee; United States; 35°07′40″N 90°02′42″W

Information
- Former name: Clay Street School
- Type: Public secondary
- Motto: We're tops! We lead and others follow.
- Established: 1873 (built)-1926 (rebuilt)
- School district: Memphis-Shelby County Schools
- Principal: Alicia Kiner
- Grades: 9-12
- Enrollment: 477 (2022-23)
- Campus: Urban
- Colors: Green and gold
- Mascot: Warrior
- Website: btwashington-hs.scsk12.org

Booker T Washington High School (also known as BTW) is a public high school located in Downtown Memphis, on the southside of Memphis, Tennessee, United States. The school was administered by the Memphis City Schools system, until the beginning of the 2013-14 school year. It is currently a part of Memphis-Shelby County Schools. The school gained national attention when U.S. President Barack Obama delivered the school's 2011 commencement address as a reward for winning the 2011 Race to the Top Commencement Challenge.

== History ==
The school was founded as the Clay Street School in 1873 and was among the first public high schools for African Americans in Memphis. Green Polonius Hamilton was its principal. It was renamed Kortrecht High School in 1891.

In 1926 a new building was constructed and the school was renamed in honor of American educator and civil rights leader Booker T. Washington. Further expansions were completed in the years since, including the Blair T. Hunt Gymnasium, dedicated in 1950.

=== Race to the Top ===
The school entered and won the 2011 Race to the Top Commencement Challenge, a competition that "invites public high schools across the country to demonstrate how their school best prepares students for college and a career." Among the required application materials were student essays and videos that demonstrated the school's innovation in education. The accomplishments of the school included increasing graduation rates from 55% in 2007 to 82% in 2010 through the use of same-gender freshman classrooms and increased teacher effectiveness. BTW also suffered from and overcame high teen pregnancy and violence rates. The school beat out more than 450 other applicant schools, and as a reward for this achievement, President Barack Obama delivered the school's 2011 commencement speech.

== Notable alumni ==
- Johnny Ace - Memphis, R&B singer
- J. Blackfoot - Memphis soul singer, member of The Soul Children, best known for his hit song "Taxi"
- The Bar-Kays - Memphis soul, R&B, and funk band formed in 1966
- Marion Barry - mayor of Washington, D.C.
- Harvey Branch - professional baseball player
- Lucie Campbell - evangelist and songwriter
- Clara Ester (1965) – civil rights activist, witness to the assassination of Martin Luther King Jr.
- W. W. Herenton - first African-American mayor of Memphis
- George W. Haley - lawyer, politician, public official, and ambasador
- Benjamin Hooks - American civil rights leader and executive director of the National Association for the Advancement of Colored People
- Verdell Mathis - Negro league baseball player
- The Mad Lads - Memphis soul, R&B, Stax recording vocal group formed at Booker T. Washington High School in 1965
- Booker T. Jones - American musician and leader of Booker T & The MGs
- David Porter (musician) - Stax Records songwriter of many '60s and '70s hits, including Soul Man for Sam & Dave
- Maxine Smith - academic, civil rights activist, and school board official
- Oscar Reed - American professional football player who played running back eight seasons for the Minnesota Vikings from 1968-1974
- Judge Russell B. Sugarmon, Jr. - civil rights attorney and Member of the Tennessee House of Representatives
- Rufus Thomas - Stax Records writer and performer
- Fred Valentine - Major League Baseball outfielder
- Maurice White - founder of soul and R&B hitmakers Earth, Wind and Fire
- Lorenzen Wright - professional basketball player

== See also ==
- List of things named after Booker T. Washington
- Manassas High School
