= Carol Johnson-Dean =

American academic administrator

President of LeMoyne–Owen College
- Interim
- In office August 26, 2019 – January 2021
- Preceded by: Andrea Lewis Miller
- Succeeded by: Vernell Bennett-Fairs

Personal details
- Born: 1948 (age 76–77)
- Children: 6
- Education: Fisk University; University of Minnesota

Carol R. Johnson-Dean (born 1948) is an American academic administrator who served as the interim president of LeMoyne–Owen College from 2019 to 2021. She was the superintendent of Minneapolis Public Schools, Memphis City Schools, and Boston Public Schools.

== Life ==
Johnson-Dean was born in 1948 to Willie Rawls and Buddy Rawls. She was raised in Brownsville, Tennessee. Her mother was an elementary school teacher and her father was the owner of a barbershop and pool hall. She was the third of nine siblings. She attended segregated schools in Brownsville. Johnson-Dean earned a bachelor's degree in elementary education from Fisk University. She completed a master's degree (1980) and doctorate (1987) in curriculum and instruction and a doctorate in educational policy and administration from the University of Minnesota College of Education and Human Development.

Johnson-Dean was a teacher and principal. In 1997, she became the superintendent of Minneapolis Public Schools. From 2003 to 2007, she was the superintendent of Memphis City Schools. She was the superintendent of Boston Public Schools from 2007 to 2013. In January 2014, she became a visiting professor in the department of leadership, policy, and organizations at the Vanderbilt Peabody College of Education and Human Development. In 2015, she was the executive director of the Tennessee Department of Education's Large District Support Program. On August 26, 2019, Johnson-Dean began an 18-month stint as the interim president of LeMoyne–Owen College, succeeding Andrea Lewis Miller. She stepped down in January 2021 and was succeeded by Vernell Bennett-Fairs.

She was married to Matthew who died in March 2012. Johnson-Dean is married to Willie Dean and has six children. In July 2023, she was carjacked by a man with an AR-15–style rifle.
