= St. Philip's Episcopal Church (Manhattan) =

Church in Manhattan, New York

- U.S. National Register of Historic Places
- New York State Register of Historic Places
- New York City Landmark
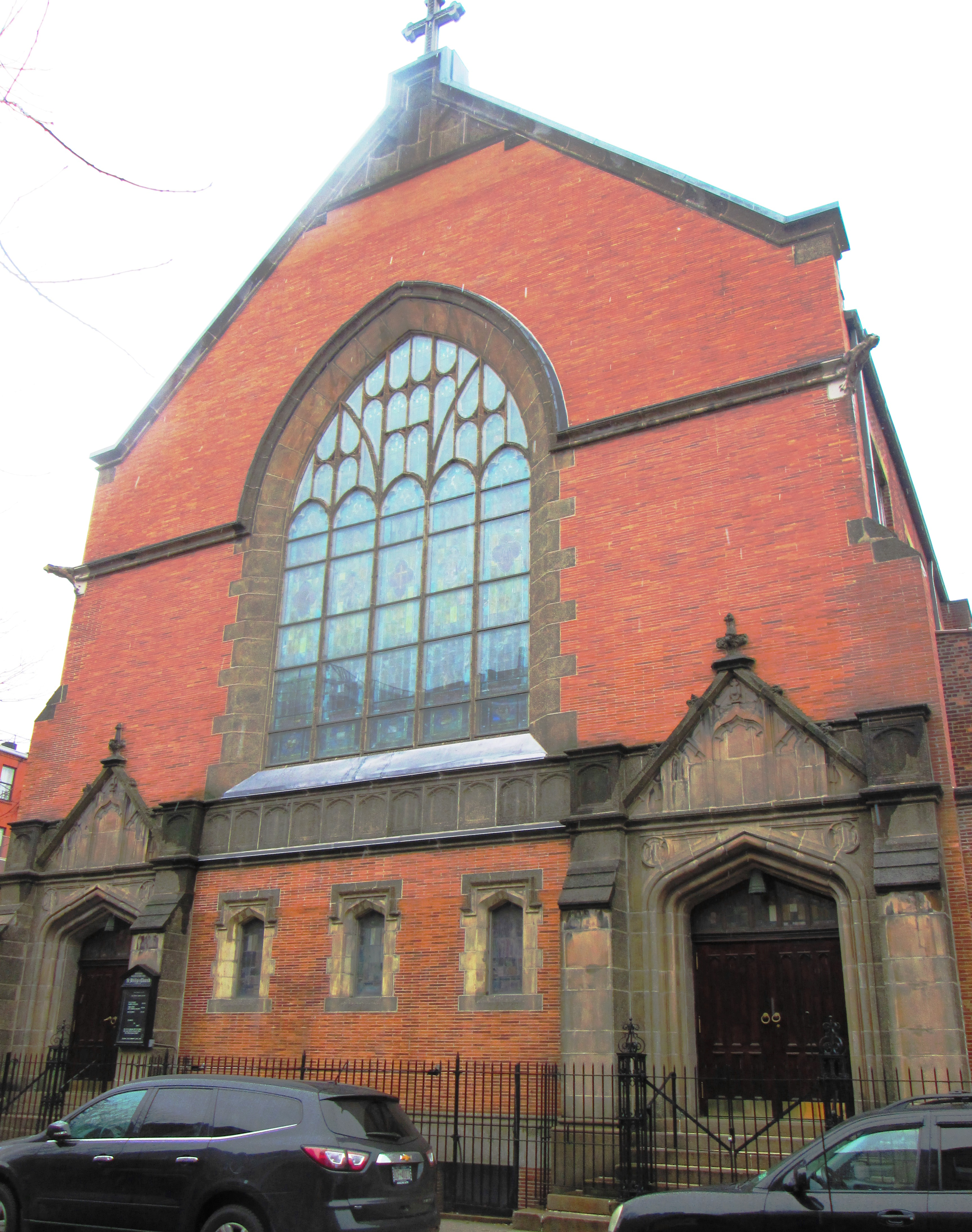
- (2014)

- Location within Manhattan Location within New York City Location within New York Location within the United States
- Location: 210-216 West 134th Street; Manhattan, New York City
- Coordinates: 40°48′53″N 73°56′43″W
- Built: 1910–1911
- Architect: Tandy & Foster: Vertner W. Tandy; George W. Foster, Jr.
- Architectural style: Gothic Revival
- NRHP reference No.: 08000933
- NYSRHP No.: 06101.007744
- NYCL No.: 1846

Significant dates
- Added to NRHP: September 25, 2008
- Designated NYSRHP: November 12, 1997
- Designated NYCL: July 13, 1993

St. Philip's Episcopal Church is a historic Episcopal church located at 204 West 134th Street, between Adam Clayton Powell Jr. Boulevard and Frederick Douglass Boulevard in the Harlem neighborhood of Manhattan, New York City. Its congregation was founded in 1809 by free African Americans worshiping at Trinity Church, Wall Street as the Free African Church of St. Philip. First located in the notorious Five Points neighborhood, it is the oldest black Episcopal parish in New York City. Historically, it was extremely influential both while located in lower Manhattan and as an institution in Harlem, and many of its members have been leaders in the black community. The church reported 207 members in 2017 and 187 members in 2023; no membership statistics were reported in 2024 parochial reports. Plate and pledge income reported for the congregation in 2024 was $206,594 with average Sunday attendance (ASA) of 45 persons.

== History ==
=== Previous buildings ===
The first church foundation stone was laid in 1819, and the first rector, serving from 1826 to 1840, was the Rev. Peter Williams, Jr., a leading abolitionist and the first African-American Episcopal priest in New York. He was one of three blacks who served on the first executive committee of the American Anti-Slavery Society. In the 1820s other men in the church were also upwardly mobile, beginning to gain financial success primarily in the service industry and joining abolitionist and other reform groups. They stressed education and promoted "character, respectability, and uplift." In the following decades Black Episcopalians continued to build on their church connections, with some creating a niche in marine trades, where white Episcopalians owned ships and served as captains. Some achieved professional status as teachers and doctors, and others had businesses as grocers and restaurateurs.

The first two sites were located on 122 Centre Street. In 1822, a brick building replaced the original wood frame church, which had been damaged by fire. It was renovated twice because of damage suffered in social unrest. In 1834 the church was vandalized by whites. During the American Civil War, it suffered damage by New York City police using it as a barracks for militia and police during the 1863 New York City draft riots.

Demographic changes continued as New York expanded and the city developed uptown. New waves of immigrants settled in the oldest housing, and more established residents moved north along the island. Along with its congregation, St. Philip's relocated uptown, by 1886 having a site on 25th Street. It sold this property c.1909 for $600,000. With this money it bought the site of the current church, as well as 10 apartment buildings on West 135th Street in Harlem. This area had previously been restricted to whites only. Some moved beyond the city limits into the developing railroad suburbs. The reredos of the current church came from the church on 25th Street.

Like many other churches, St. Philip's had considerable stability in its leadership through the mid-20th century. Rev. Hutchens C. Bishop was rector for 47 years, from 1886 until 1933. Bishop's son, Shelton Hale Bishop, served as rector from 1933–1957.

=== Current building ===
The present church building was designed by architects Vertner Woodson Tandy and George Washington Foster of the firm Tandy & Foster. Both were prominent African-American architects: Tandy was the first African-American architect licensed to practice in New York State and Foster was among the first licensed by the State of New Jersey. The church was built in 1910–1911 in the Neo-Gothic style.

The church was designated as a New York City Landmark in 1993, and was added to the National Register of Historic Places in 2008.

== Parishioners ==
In the 19th century, notable parishioners included Thomas Jennings, Thomas Downing, his son George T. Downing, Isaiah DeGrasse, Dr. James McCune Smith, and Alexander Crummell. Local teacher Susan Elizabeth Frazier was a long-term member, and upon her death other teachers laid a tablet in the church in her honor.

In the 20th century, members of the church included political and cultural leaders such as professor and public intellectual W. E. B. Du Bois; Thurgood Marshall, NAACP Legal Defense Fund attorney and Supreme Court Justice; and poet and playwright Langston Hughes.

== See also ==
- List of New York City Designated Landmarks in Manhattan above 110th Street
- National Register of Historic Places listings in Manhattan above 110th Street
- Lafargue Clinic, a mental health clinic that operated in the church basement from 1946 to 1958
