= Susan Elizabeth Frazier =

American teacher (1864–1924)

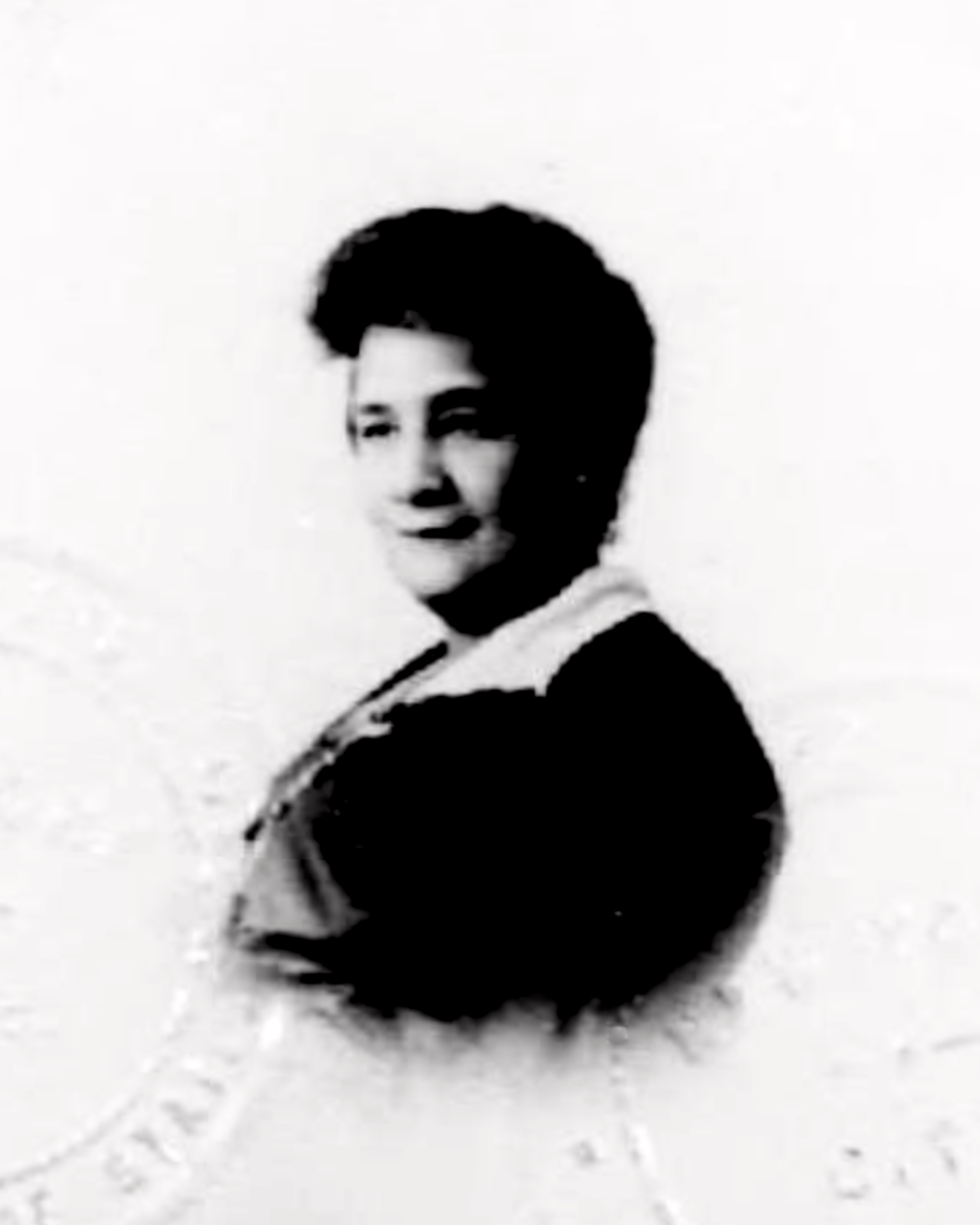
- Susan Elizabeth Frazier
- Born: May 29, 1864; New York City, U.S.
- Died: February 3, 1924 (aged 59); New York City, U.S.
- Occupation: New York City public school teacher

Susan Elizabeth Frazier (May 29, 1864 – February 3, 1924) was a thought leader on the issues of women's and African Americans' rights and capacity. She was an active and accomplished substitute teacher in New York City Public Schools at a time when such opportunities for African-American women were very limited.

== Early life and education ==
Susan Elizabeth Frazier was born on May 29, 1864, in New York City, to Helen Eldridge Frazier and Louis M. Frazier. She attended public schools as a child, and Hunter College afterwards. When she entered the college, it was called the Female Normal and High School, and was a women's college focused on training teachers. During her time there, the minimum admission age was raised to 14 years old, and the length of study went from three to four years. She graduated in 1888.

== Career ==
=== Teaching ===
After graduating, Frazier became a substitute teacher at P.S. 80 in New York City, teaching under a probationary license. Once she had substituted for the required number of hours, she applied to be placed on the eligible list of regular teachers in the city's school system, which schools would pull from to choose permanent teachers. She was the first African American woman to be placed on the list. Due to racial discrimination, she was not contacted by any school to become a regular teacher for several years.

On February 16, 1892, Frazier delivered an address to an audience of the Brooklyn Literary Union, called "Some Afro American Women of Mark" which has been referenced from its time of first presentation, through to contemporary books and dissertations today.

In 1894, Frazier applied for the position of New York City public school teacher, at a school with white students. Later that year, she received a request to meet in person with School 58 principal F. W. James. Upon meeting her, James declined to appoint her due to her African heritage, saying such an appointment could "cause trouble". At the time, African-Americans were restricted to teaching only other African Americans.

She is quoted as saying at the time: "There are colored teachers in the schools of Brooklyn, Jersey City, Boston and other cities, and I think it time that the color line was obliterated in appointing a teacher in New York City."

So she took her case to the courts, which initially rejected her plea in 1895. The judge said that school authorities could choose any teachers they wanted from the eligible list, regardless of discrimination, even though the judge saw and condemned the racism present in the case. However, Frazier received an appointment in 1895 to teach in a racially integrated school in the system, becoming the first African American to teach in one of those schools in New York City. Her appointment was finalized on May 26, 1896. She faced pushback from other teachers and school officials, but continued to teach until her death in 1924.

=== Service ===
During World War I, she founded and was president of the Women's Auxiliary of the Old Fifteenth National Guard, an African-American troop, and continued to work with the 369th Infantry, as it became known.

Frazier was among 15 New York City public school teachers who won a contest promoted in the spring of 1919 by the Evening Telegram. The contest, based on votes from the public, identified the most popular teachers and sent them to the very recently silenced battlefields of Europe. They left for Europe on November 10, 1919, on the SS Royal George, receiving a leave of absence from their teaching positions.

Frazier served as president of the Woman's Loyal Union in New York CIty. She taught Sunday School for a long time and was president of the Church Missionary Society.

== Personal life and death ==
Frazier was the great-granddaughter of African-American Revolutionary War Veteran Andrew Frazier. She was a member of St. Philip's Episcopal Church in Harlem, New York City.

Upon her death in 1924, full military honors were held in the 369th Regiment Armory and her casket was draped with the American flag. This was very unusual for African-American women at the time. A memorial was held at St. Philip's, and on June 21, 1925, the church unveiled a tablet, placed by other teachers, in Frazier's honor.

== Bibliography ==
- Maffly-Kipp, Laurie (2010). Women's Work: An Anthology of African-American Women's Historical Writings from Antebellum America to the Harlem Renaissance. Oxford University Press.
- Mitchell & Taylor (2009). The Cambridge Companion to African American Women's Literature.
- Brown, Nikki (2006). Private Politics and Public Voices: Black Women's Activism from World War I to the New Deal. ISBN 9780253348043.
- Yellin, Jean (1991). The Pen is Ours: A Listing of Writings by and about African-American Women Before 1910 with Secondary Bibliography to the Present. Oxford University Press.
- Notable American Women, 1607–1950: A Biographical Dictionary. 1971.
- Dannett, Sylvia (1964). Profiles of Negro Womanhood: 1619–1900. Educational Heritage.
- Brown, Hallie Q. (1926). Homespun Heroines and Other Women of Distinction. Xenia, OH: The Aldine Publishing Company.
