= George Washington Foster =

American architect (1866–1923)

- Born: George Washington Foster Jr. December 18, 1866; Newark, New Jersey, U.S.
- Died: December 20, 1923 (aged 57); Park Ridge, New Jersey, U.S.
- Resting place: Westwood Cemetery; Westwood, New Jersey, U.S.
- Known for: Architect
- Spouse: Carrie
- Children: 6

George Washington Foster Jr. (December 18, 1866 – December 20, 1923), was an American architect. He was among the first African-American architects licensed by the State of New Jersey in 1908, and later New York (1916). Foster partnered with Vertner Woodson Tandy (1885–1949), the first African-American architect licensed by the State of New York, in the firm of Tandy and Foster, which was active from 1908 to 1914.

== Early life ==
George Washington Foster Jr. was born on December 18, 1866, in Newark, New Jersey, to Isabella (née Davis) Foster. His father was a carriage stripper. His mother was a relative of Jefferson Davis.

Foster attended night school at Cooper Union and studied architecture.

== Career ==
Foster is said to have worked in the office of Henry Hardenbergh from 1888 to 1889, who designed the New York City landmarks Dakota Apartment Building, Plaza Hotel, and the first Waldorf-Astoria, on the present site of the Empire State Building. During his time with Hardenbergh, he would have worked on the Waldorf Hotel in 1892. By 1903, he may also have worked on the Flatiron Building, designed by the Chicago-based firm of D. H. Burnham.

Foster met Vertner Woodson Tandy, New York's first registered African-American architect and formed the architectural firm Tandy & Foster together in 1908. In the same year, Foster received his license to practice architecture in New Jersey. Tandy & Foster designed St. Philip's Episcopal Church (Harlem, New York) in 1910. After 1915, Foster was licensed to practice in New York and separated from Tandy and managed his own office in Harlem until his death. He worked on the Mother AME Zion Church in Harlem prior to his death.

== Personal life ==
Foster relocated with his wife, Carrie, to Park Ridge, New Jersey, in a house he designed and built. He and his wife had six children, including Henry Hardenburg Foster, who was named after his employer.

He died of pneumonia on December 20, 1923, in a house he designed on Colony Avenue, in Bergen County, Park Ridge, New Jersey. He is buried at the Westwood Cemetery in Westwood, New Jersey.

== Works ==
- Berea Hall at Lincoln Institute in Simpsonville, Kentucky (1910)
- Parish House, Harlem, New York, Queen Anne style (1910)
- St. Philip's Episcopal Church (Manhattan), Gothic Revival style (1911)
- Mother African Methodist Episcopal Zion Church, Gothic Revival style (1923-1925)

== See also ==
- African-American architects
