= Vertner Woodson Tandy =

American architect

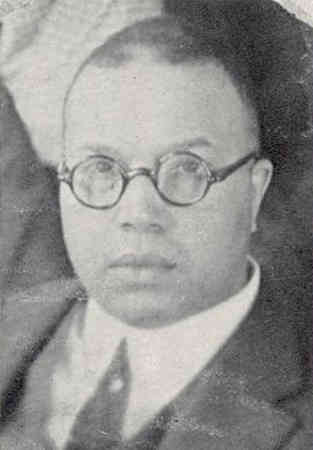
- Tandy, c. 1920
- Born: May 17, 1885; Lexington, Kentucky, U.S.
- Died: November 7, 1949 (aged 64); Manhattan, New York City, U.S.
- Monuments: Historic marker in Lexington, Kentucky, U.S.
- Known for: First registered African-American architect in New York State; co-founder of Alpha Phi Alpha fraternity at Cornell University
- Spouse: Sadie Tandy
- Children: Vertner Woodson Tandy Jr.

Vertner Woodson Tandy (May 17, 1885 – November 7, 1949) was an American architect, and the first African American registered architect in New York state. He was one of the seven founders (commonly referred to as "The Seven Jewels") of Alpha Phi Alpha fraternity at Cornell University in 1906. He served as the first treasurer of the Alpha chapter, and was the designer of the fraternity pin. The fraternity became incorporated under his auspices.

== Early life and education ==
Tandy was born on May 17, 1885, in Lexington, Kentucky. His parents were Henry A. Tandy and Emma Brice Tandy. Henry Tandy was a successful entrepreneur and building contractor. Born enslaved, in 1893 he established the firm Tandy & Byrd in Lexington. Among prominent projects of the firm are the Lexington Opera House and the Fayette County Courthouse, now the site of the Lexington Visitor Center.

In 1904, Tandy attended Tuskegee Institute, studying architectural drawing.

He married Sadie Dorsette, a daughter of the Montgomery physician Cornelius N. Dorsette.

In 1905, he transferred to Cornell University, which he graduated from in 1907 with a degree in architecture. He was one of the founding members, collectively called the "Seven Jewels," of the Alpha Phi Alpha Society, the first African-American fraternity, in 1906.

== Career ==
After graduation, Tandy and George Washington Foster started their own firm, Tandy & Foster, with offices on Broadway in New York City. Tandy became the State of New York's first registered Black architect.

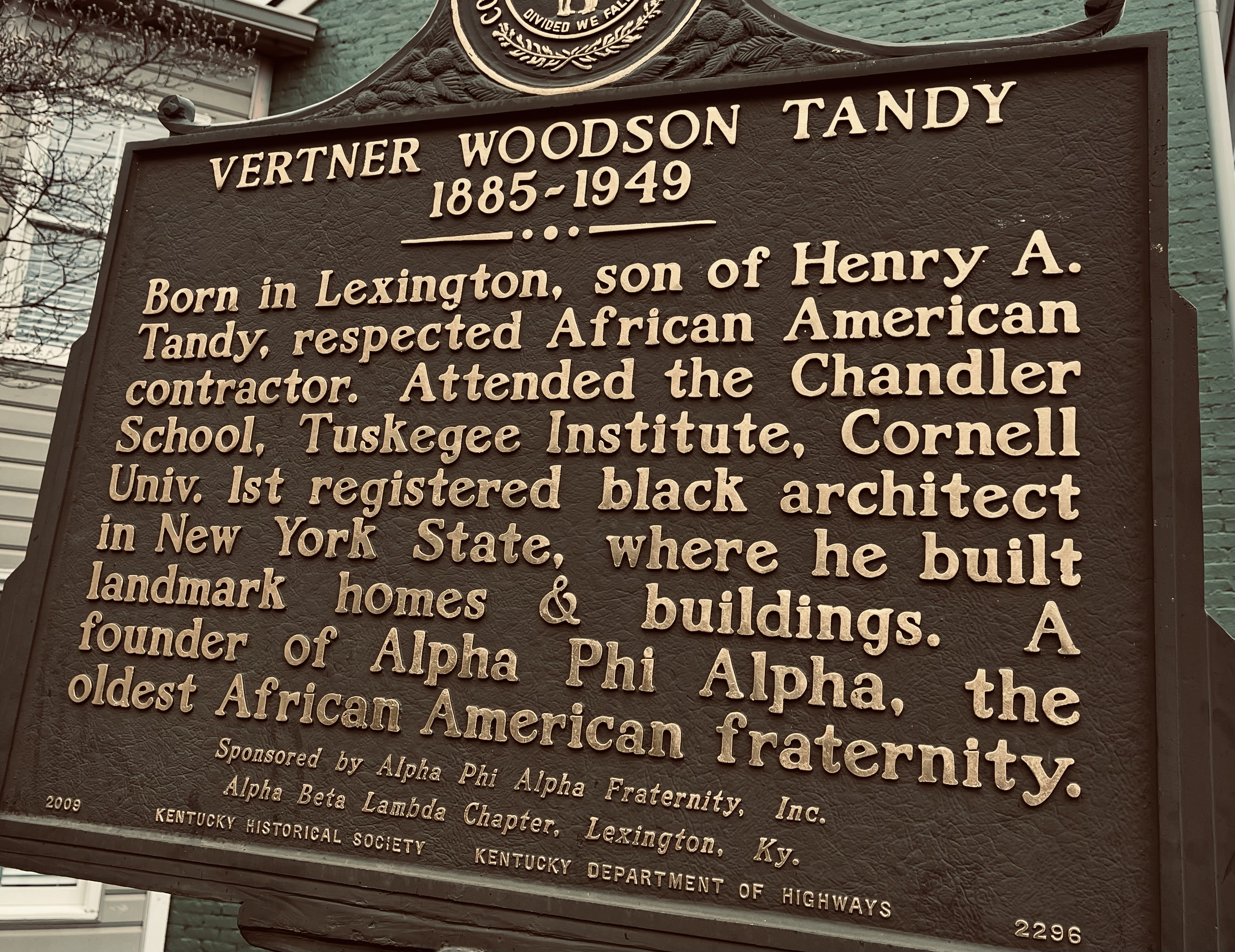
Historic marker installed 2009 honoring Tandy, sponsored by Alpha Phi Alpha, the oldest African American fraternity

Tandy's most famous commission was probably Villa Lewaro, the $250,000 mansion for the daughter of the Harlem millionairess Madam C. J. Walker, in Irvington on Hudson, New York. The Italianate-style mansion was completed in 1918 and became important in the Harlem Renaissance prior to Walker's death. Among his other extant work are the Ivey Delph Apartments, and St. Philip's Episcopal Church at 204 West 134th Street in Harlem, through his architectural firm, Tandy & Foster. The Ivey Delph Apartments, designed in 1948, was listed on the National Register of Historic Places in 2005.

Tandy also holds the distinction of being the first African American to pass the military commissioning examination. He was commissioned first lieutenant in the 15th Infantry of the New York National Guard.

== Death ==
Tandy died of pneumonia on November 7, 1949, aged 64, in Manhattan, New York City. He is honored with a historic marker in Lexington, Kentucky, installed in 2009.

== Work ==
- Berea Hall (1910) at Lincoln Institute, Simpsonville, Kentucky; as Tandy & Foster
- St. Philip's Episcopal Church (1910–1911) at 204 West 134th Street, Harlem, Manhattan; as Tandy & Foster
- Villa Lewaro (1918), Irvington, Hudson, New York; a $250,000 mansion for the daughter of the Harlem millionaire Madam C. J. Walker
- Ivey Delph Apartments (1948) in Hamilton Heights, Manhattan; NRHP listed
