= 369th Infantry Regiment (United States) =

United States Army African-American regiment

15th New York National Guard Regiment 369th Infantry Regiment
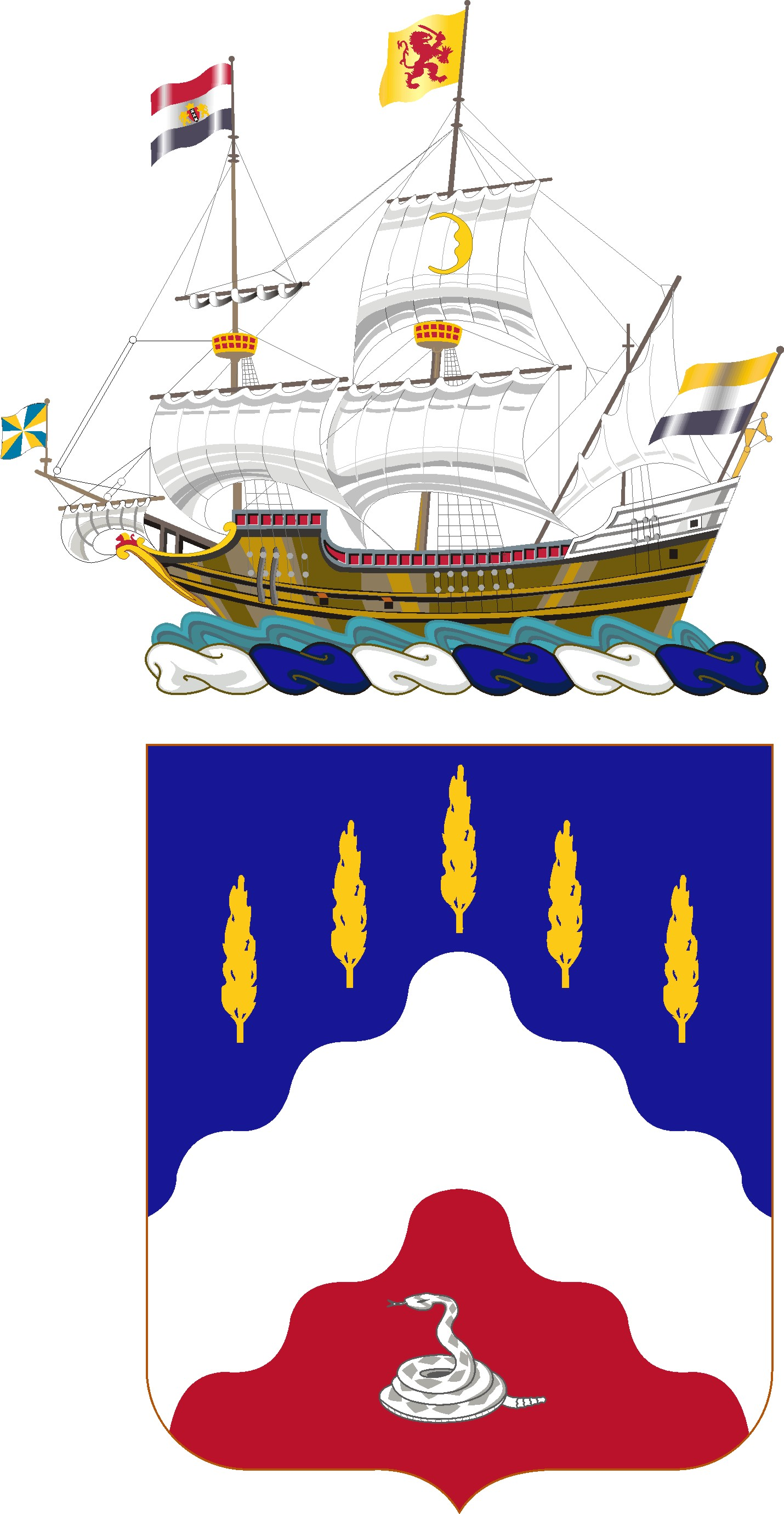
- Coat of arms
- Active: 2 June 1913 – present (369th Sustainment Brigade); 15 May 1942 – 3 February 1946 (AUS)
- Country: United States
- Branch: United States Army; French Army (attached during WWI)
- Type: Infantry
- Size: Regiment
- Nicknames: Hell-fighters, Men of Bronze, Harlem Rattlers
- Mottos: "Don't Tread on Me", "God Damn", "Let's Go"
- Engagements: World War I: Champagne–Marne; Meuse–Argonne; World War II: New Guinea; Bismarck Archipelago

Commanders
- Notable commanders: William Hayward; Benjamin O. Davis Sr.

Insignia
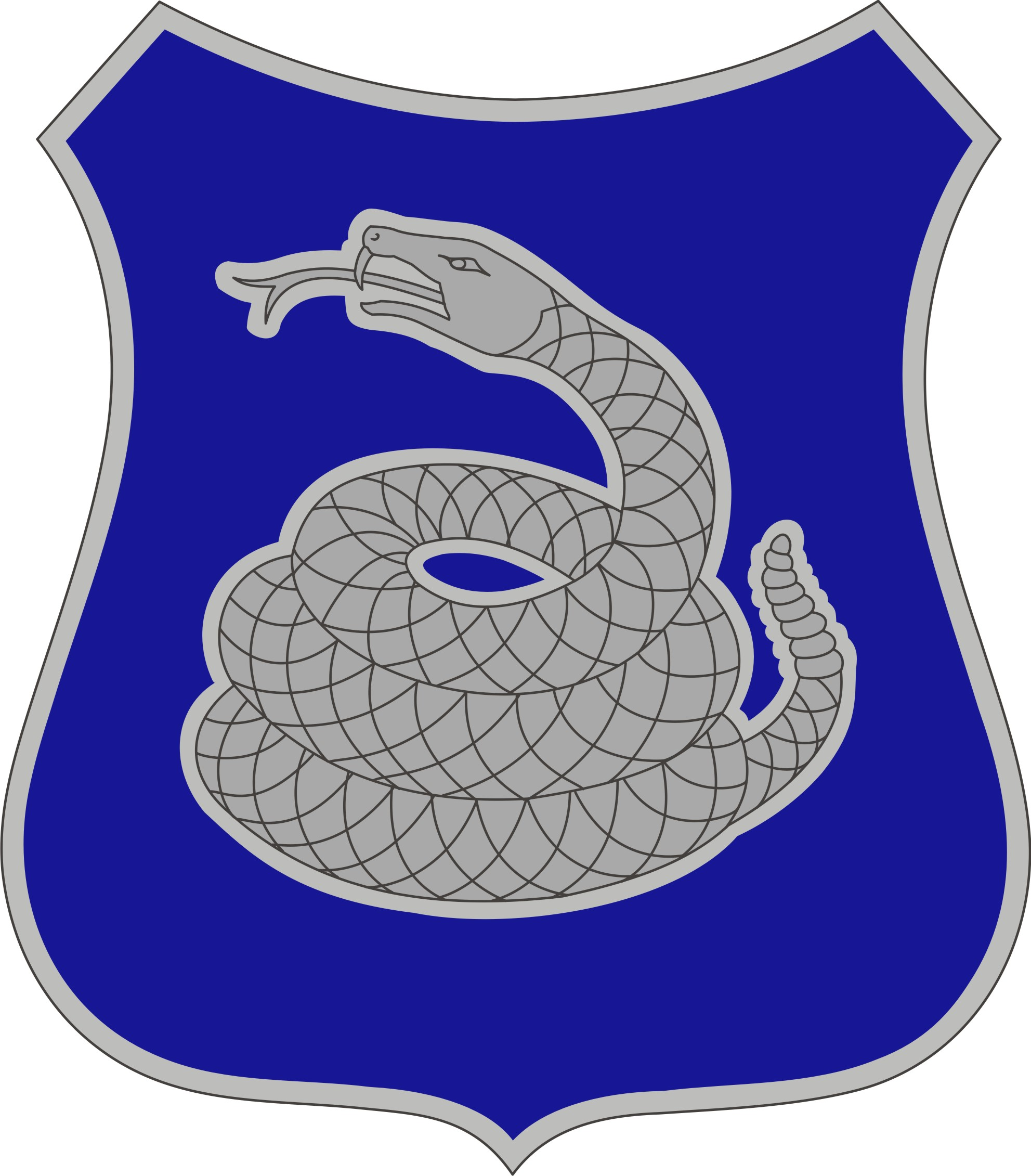
- DUI

The 369th Infantry Regiment, originally formed as the 15th New York National Guard Regiment before it was re-organized as the 369th upon its federalization, and commonly referred to as the Harlem Hellfighters, was an infantry regiment of the New York Army National Guard during World War I and World War II. The regiment mainly consisted of African Americans. With the 370th Infantry Regiment, it was known for being one of the first African-American regiments to serve with the American Expeditionary Forces during World War I.

The regiment was named the Black Rattlers after arriving in France by its commander Colonel William Hayward. The nickname Men of Bronze (French: Hommes de Bronze) was given to the regiment by the French after they had witnessed the gallantry of the Americans fighting in the trenches. Legend has it that they were called the Hellfighters (German: Höllenkämpfer) by the German enemy, although there is no documentation of this and the moniker may have been a creation of the American press. During World War I, the 369th spent 191 days in front line trenches, more than any other American unit. They also suffered the most losses of any American regiment, with 1,500 casualties. The regiment was also the first of the Allied forces to cross the Rhine into Germany. The lineage of the 369th Infantry is perpetuated today by the 42nd Infantry Division Sustainment Brigade.

== Background ==
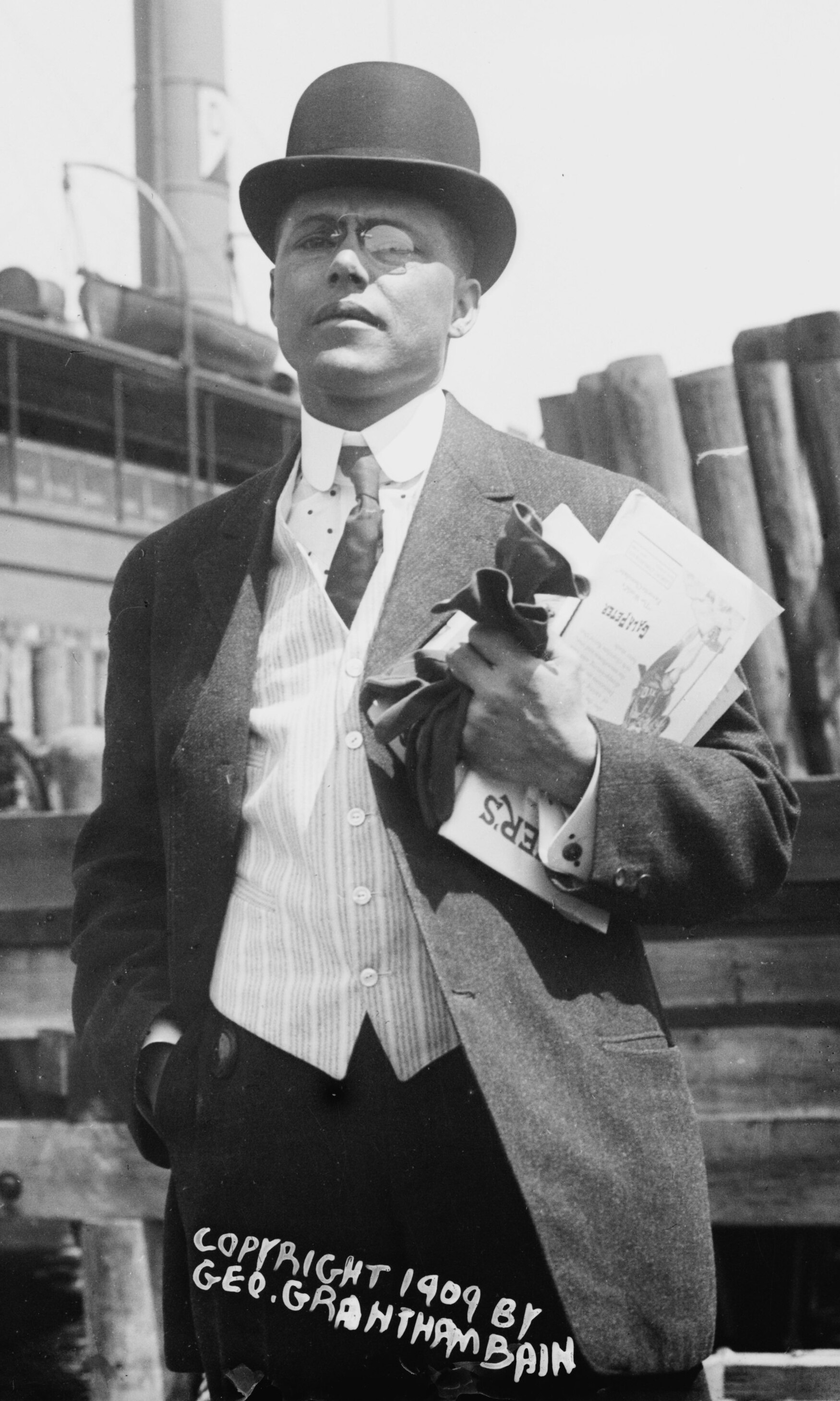
Emmett Jay Scott helped form the Hellfighters

On 5 October 1917, Emmett Jay Scott, long-time secretary to Booker T. Washington, was appointed Special Assistant to Newton D. Baker, the Secretary of War. Scott was to serve as a confidential advisor in situations that involved the well-being of ten million African Americans and their roles in the war. While many African Americans who served in the Great War believed racial discrimination would dissipate once they returned home, that did not happen.

Although many African Americans were eager to fight in the war, they were often turned away from military service. When the United States realized that it did not have close to enough soldiers, it decided to pass the Selective Service Act of 1917 which required all men from the ages of 21 to 30 to register for the draft; this included African Americans. Many African Americans enlisted believing that their military service would give them the opportunity to change the way they were perceived by white Americans.

The 369th Regiment was reformed from the National Guard's 15th Regiment in New York. The 15th New York National Guard was a state militia regiment which served to help suppress the 1863 New York City draft riots and was mustered into federal service for 30 days in June 1864, providing manpower for Army posts in the New York Harbor. The 15th Regiment was reconstituted after Charles S. Whitman was elected Governor of New York. He enforced the legislation that was passed due to the efforts of the 10th Cavalry in Mexico, which had passed as a law that had not manifested until June 2, 1913.

When the U.S. entered World War I, many African Americans believed that entering the armed forces would help eliminate racial discrimination throughout the United States. Many felt it was "a God-sent blessing" so they could prove they deserved respect from white Americans through service in the armed forces. On the other hand, many were forced through false promises of freedom and equality. Through the efforts of the Central Committee of Negro College Men and President Wilson, a special training camp to train black officers for the proposed black regiments was established.

== World War I ==
=== Formation ===
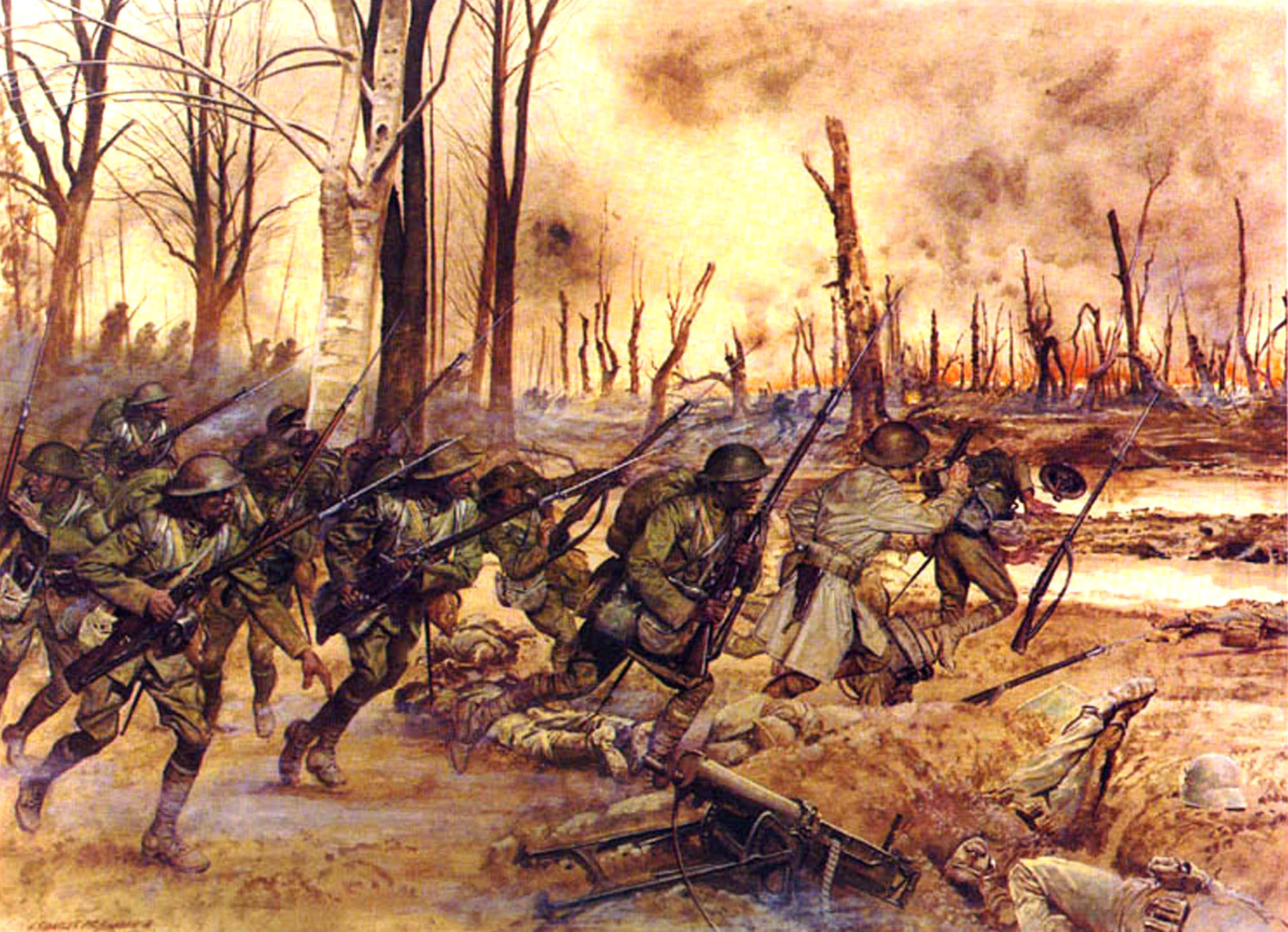
The 369th in action, by H. Charles McBarron Jr. After being detached and seconded to the French, they wore the Adrian helmet, while retaining the rest of their U.S. uniform. Seen here at Séchault, France on 29 September 1918, during the Meuse-Argonne Offensive, they wear the U.S. Army-issue Brodie helmet, correct for that time.

The 369th Infantry Regiment was constituted on 2 June 1913 in the New York Army National Guard as the 15th New York Infantry Regiment. The 369th Infantry was organized on 29 June 1916 at New York City.

The infantry was called into Federal service on 25 July 1917 at Camp Whitman, New York. While at Camp Whitman, the 369th Infantry learned basic military practices. After their training at Camp Whitman, the 369th was called into active duty in New York. While in New York, the 369th's three battalions were spread throughout New York where they guarded rail lines, construction sites, and other camps.

Then on 8 October 1917 the Regiment traveled to Camp Wadsworth in Spartanburg, South Carolina, where they received training in actual combat. Camp Wadsworth was set up similar to the French battlefields. While at Camp Wadsworth they experienced significant racism from the local communities and from other units. There was one incident in which two soldiers from the 15th Regiment, Lieutenant James Reese Europe and Noble Sissle, were refused by the owner of a hotel shop when they attempted to buy a newspaper. Several soldiers from the white 27th Division, a New York National Guard organization, came to stand with and support their fellow New York soldiers. Lieutenant Europe, however, directed them to leave before violence erupted. There were many other shops that refused to sell goods to the members of the 15th Regiment, so members of the 27th Division told the shop owners that if they did not serve black soldiers that they can close their stores and leave town. The white soldiers then stated "They're our buddies. And we won't buy from men who treat them unfairly."

The 15th Infantry Regiment NYARNG was assigned on 1 December 1917 to the 185th Infantry Brigade. It was commanded by Col. William Hayward, a member of the Union League Club of New York, which sponsored the 369th in the tradition of the 20th U.S. Colored Infantry, which the club had sponsored in the U.S. Civil War. The 15th Infantry Regiment shipped out from the New York Port of Embarkation on 27 December 1917, and joined its brigade upon arrival in France. Despite its designation and training as an infantry regiment, the unit was relegated to labor service duties in France instead of being assigned a combat mission.

The 15th Infantry Regiment, NYARNG was reorganized and re-designated on 1 March 1918 as the 369th Infantry Regiment, but the unit continued labor service duties while it awaited a decision as to its future.

=== Assignment to the French Army ===
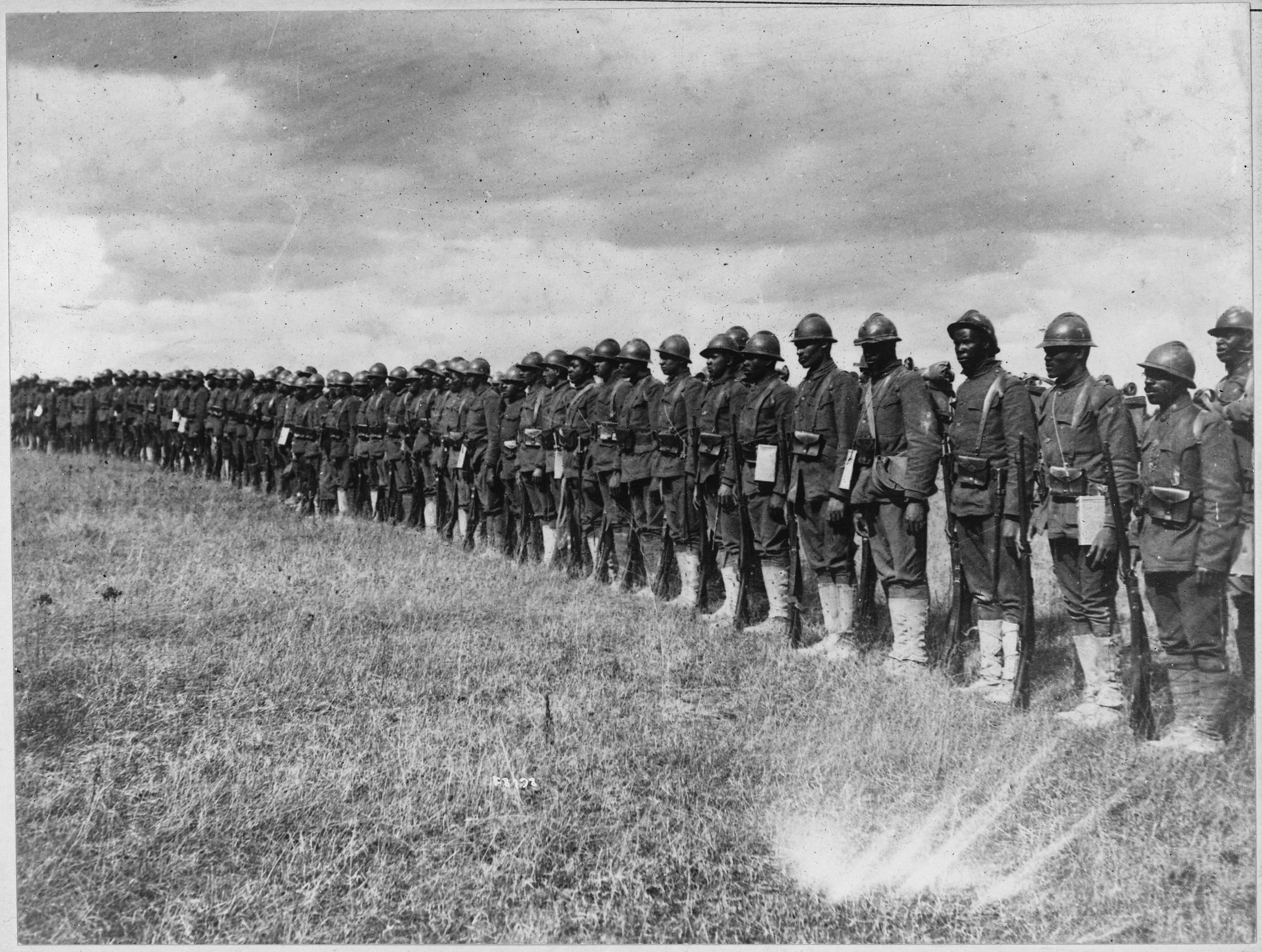
15th Infantry in France, wearing Adrian helmets

Because of the U.S. Army's policy of continued segregation between African American and White units, it was decided on the 8th of April, 1918, to reassign the unit to the 16th Division of the 4th Army of the French Armed Forces for the duration of American participation in the war. Eventually the 369th Infantry were issued French weapons, helmets, belts, and pouches, although they continued to wear their U.S. uniforms. While in the United States, the Regiment was subjected to intense racial discrimination, and its members looked down upon. French Colonel J.L.A. Linard of the American Expeditionary Forces headquarters was persuaded to write the notorious pamphlet Secret Information Concerning Black American Troops, which "warned" French civilian authorities of the alleged inferior nature and supposed racist tendencies of African Americans.

The 369th was largely treated similarly to other French units at the time. The regiment was not segregated from other French units, and generally faced little racial discrimination. Prior to the 369th's integration, the French army had included many colonial units with non-white personnel, many from Morocco and Senegal. Having also faced severe manpower shortages, French soldiers shared less concern for race than Americans.

The 369th Infantry Regiment was relieved 8 May 1918 from assignment to the 185th Infantry Brigade and went into the trenches as part of the French 16th Division. It served continuously until 3 July before returning to combat in the Second Battle of the Marne. Later, the 369th was reassigned to Gen. Lebouc's 161st Division to participate in the Allied counterattack. On one tour, they were out for over six months, which was the longest deployment of any unit in World War I. On 19 August, the regiment went off the line for rest and training of replacements.

While overseas, the Hellfighters saw enemy propaganda intended for them. It claimed Germans had done nothing wrong to African Americans, and they should be fighting the US, which had oppressed them for years. It had the opposite of the intended effect.

On 25 September 1918, the French 4th Army went on the offensive in conjunction with the American drive in the Meuse–Argonne. The 369th turned in a good account in heavy fighting, though they sustained severe losses. The unit captured the important village of Séchault. At one point the 369th advanced faster than French troops on their right and left flanks and risked being cut off. By the time the regiment pulled back for reorganization, it had advanced 14 kilometres (8.7 mi) through severe German resistance.

In mid-October the regiment was moved to a quiet sector in the Vosges, and was stationed there on 11 November, the day of the Armistice. Six days later, the 369th made its last advance and on 26 November, reaching the banks of the river Rhine and becoming the first Allied unit to do so. The regiment was relieved on 12 December 1918 from assignment to the French 161st Division. When the regiment attempted to travel home on board the USS Virginia, the ship's captain, Henry Joseph Ziegemeier, had them removed "on the grounds that no blacks had ever traveled on an American battleship." It returned to the New York Port of Embarkation and was demobilized on 28 February 1919 at Camp Upton at Yaphank, New York, and returned to the New York Army National Guard.

=== Honors ===
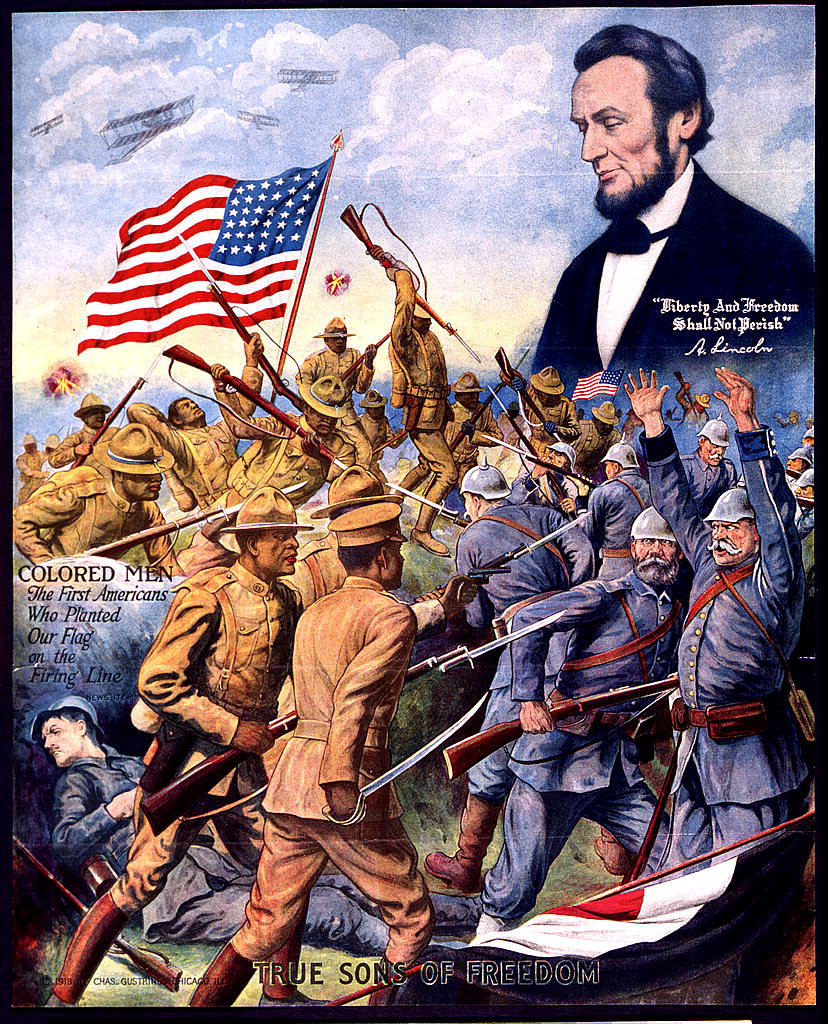
Wartime poster of the 369th fighting German soldiers, with the figure of Abraham Lincoln above

One Medal of Honor and numerous Distinguished Service Crosses were awarded to members of the regiment.

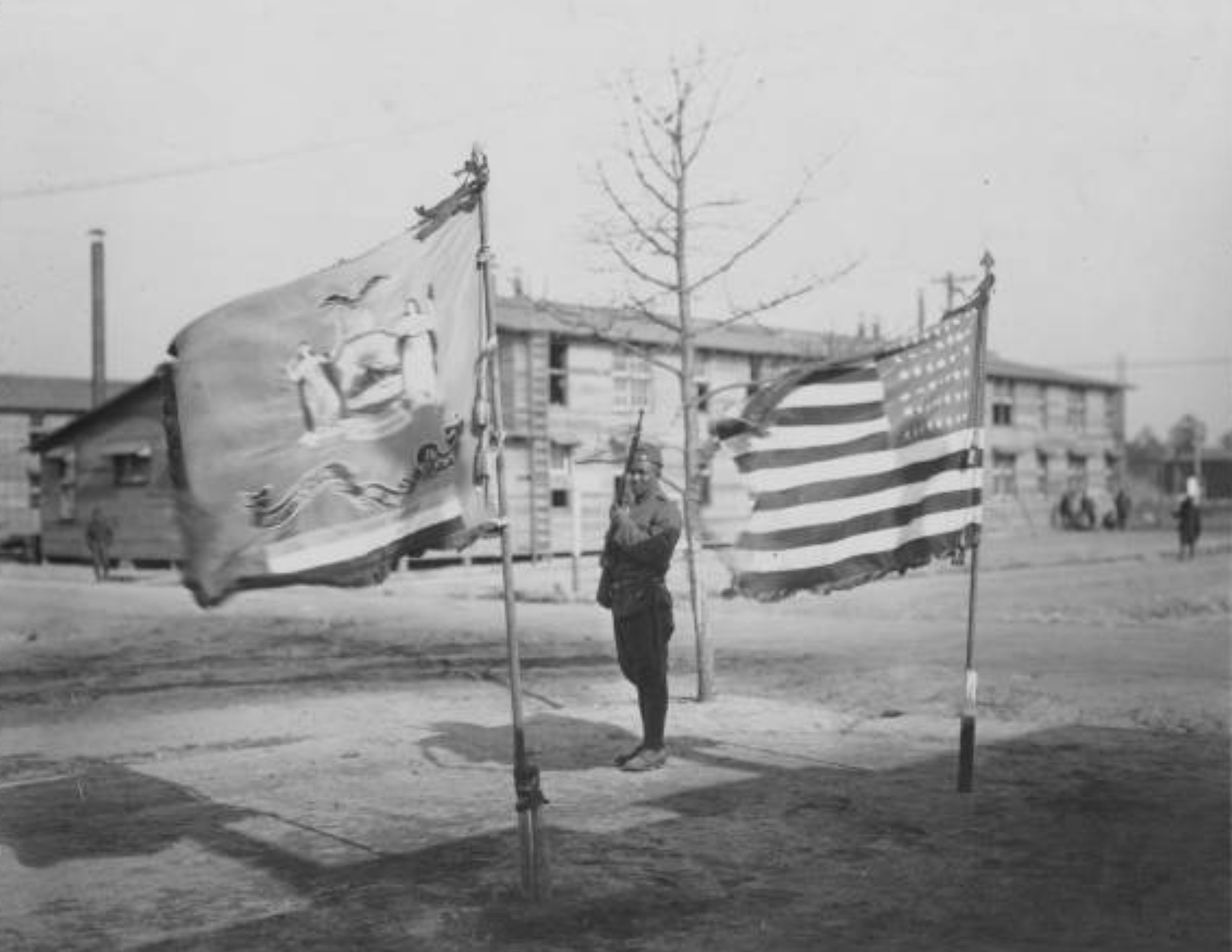
Flag of the old 15th New York Regiment (369th Colored Infantry) after being decorated by the French

Pvt. Henry Johnson, a former rail station porter from Albany, New York, earned widespread acclaim in the 369th for his extraordinary feats in combat in France, leading to the moniker "Black Death". In May 1918, Johnson and Pvt. Needham Roberts valiantly repelled a 24-man German patrol, despite both sustaining severe injuries. Amidst the chaos, Johnson directed Roberts to alert the French units about the approaching enemy, but Roberts returned under gunfire. Together, they fought until a German grenade incapacitated Roberts. Undeterred, Johnson took it upon himself to maintain the defensive line and shield his comrade. With depleted ammunition, Johnson engaged the enemy using grenades, the rifle butt, and eventually a bolo knife. Reports suggest Johnson may have slain at least four German soldiers and wounded around 30 others, enduring at least 21 injuries himself. Recognizing their valor, over 100 men from the 369th received American and/or French decorations, with Johnson becoming the first American to be awarded the Croix de Guerre.

On 13 December 1918, one month after Armistice Day, the French government awarded the Croix de Guerre to 170 individual members of the 369th, and a unit citation was awarded to the entire regiment. It was pinned to the unit's colors by General Lebouc.

One of the first units in the United States armed forces to have black officers in addition to all-black enlisted men, the 369th could boast of a fine combat record, a regimental Croix de Guerre, and several unit citations, along with many individual decorations for valor from the French government. Nevertheless, the poor replacement system —coupled with no respite from the line — took its toll, leaving the unit utterly exhausted by the armistice in November. The 369th Infantry Regiment was the first New York unit to return to the United States, and was the first unit to march up Fifth Avenue from the Washington Square Park Arch to their armory in Harlem. Their unit was placed on the permanent list with other veteran units.

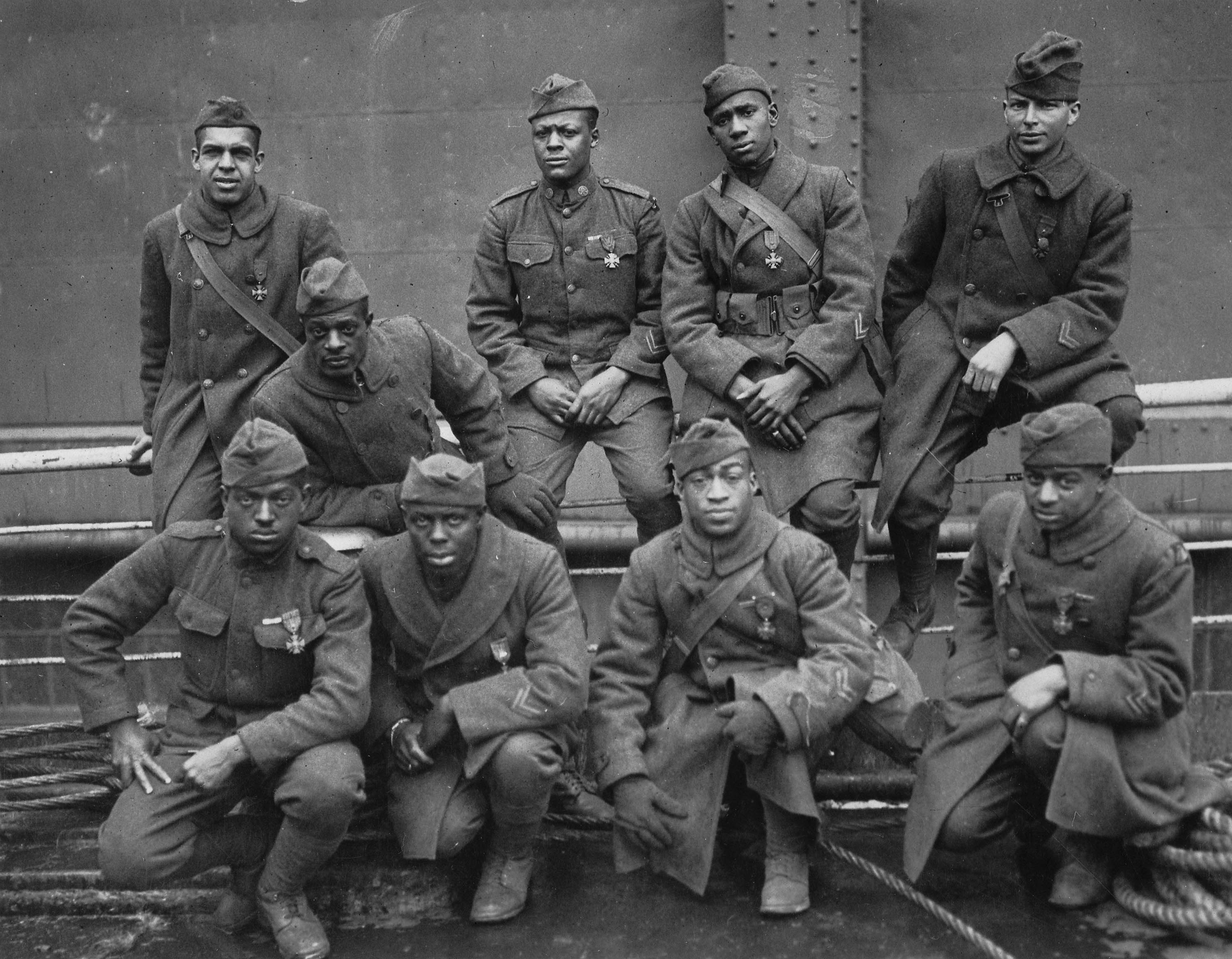
Soldiers of the 369th (15th N.Y.), awarded the Croix de Guerre for gallantry in action, 1919. Left to right. Front row: Pvt. Ed Williams, Herbert Taylor, Pvt. Leon Fraitor, Pvt. Ralph Hawkins. Back Row: Sgt. H. D. Prinas, Sgt. Dan Storms, Pvt. Joe Williams, Pvt. Alfred Hanley, Cpl. T. W. Taylor

Arthur W. Little, who had been a battalion commander for the 369th, wrote in the regimental history From Harlem to the Rhine, it was official that the outfit was 191 days under fire, never lost a foot of ground or had a man taken prisoner; on two occasions men were captured, but were recovered. Only once did it fail to take its objective and that was due largely to bungling by French artillery support.

By the end of the 369th Infantry's campaign in World War, I they were present in the Champagne – Marne, Meuse – Argonne, Champagne 1918, Alsace 1918 campaigns in which they suffered 1,500 casualties, the highest of any U.S. regiment. In addition, the unit was plagued by acute discipline problems resulting from disproportionate casualties among the unit's longest-serving members and related failures to assimilate new soldiers. The 369th also fought in distinguished battles such as Belleau Wood and Chateau-Thierry.

== 369th Regiment Military Band ==
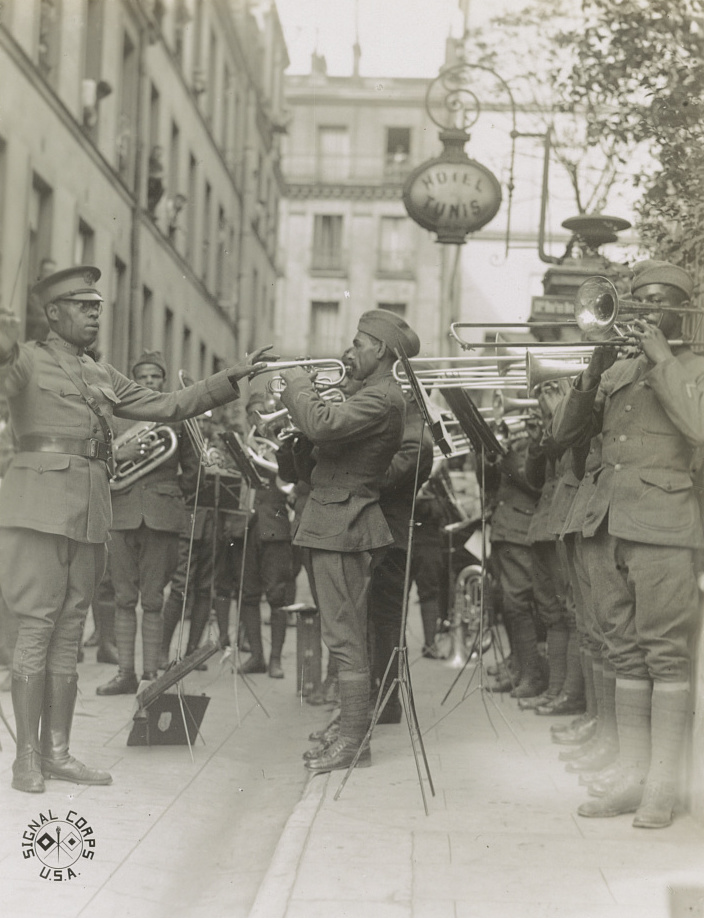
The 369th band played jazz for American wounded in the courtyard of a Paris hospital

The 369th Regiment "Hellfighters Band" was relied upon not only in battle but also for morale. So, by the end of their tour, they became one of the most famous military bands throughout Europe. They followed the 369th overseas and were highly regarded and known for being able to immediately boost morale. While overseas the 369th Regiment made up less than 1% of the soldiers deployed but was responsible for over 20% of the territory of all the land assigned to the United States. During the war the 369th's regimental band (under the direction of James Reese Europe) became famous throughout Europe by introducing the until-then unknown music called jazz to the British, French and other European audiences.

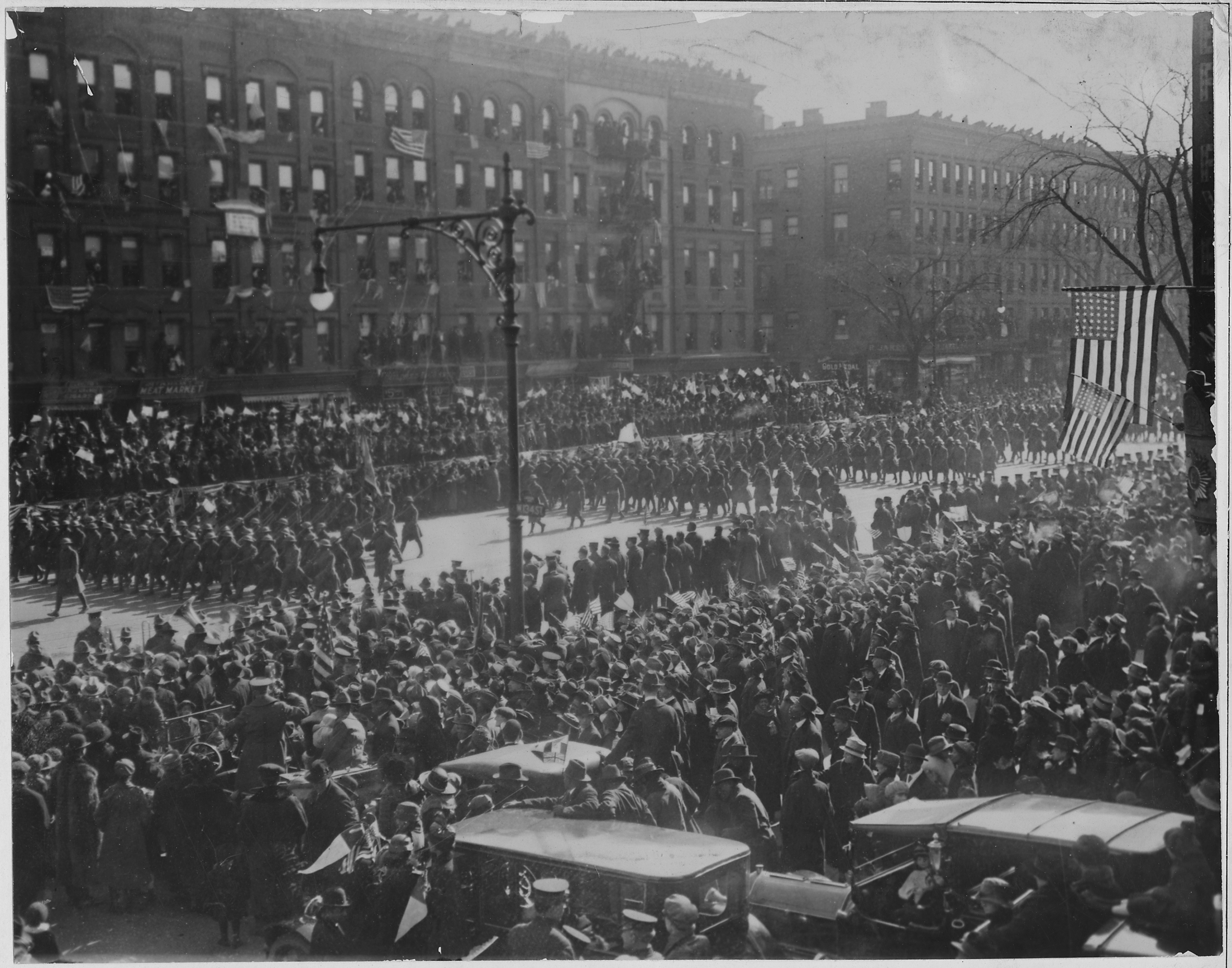
The 369th Infantry (old 15th National Guard) parade through New York City.

At the end of the war, the 369th returned to New York City, and on 17 February 1919, paraded through the city. This day became an unofficial holiday of sorts for all of Harlem. Many black school children were dismissed from school so that they could attend the parade. With the addition of many adults there were thousands of people that lined the streets to see the 369th Regiment: the parade began on Fifth Avenue at 61st Street, proceeded uptown past ranks of white bystanders, turned west on 110th Street, and then turned onto Lenox Avenue, and marched into Harlem, where black New Yorkers packed the sidewalks to see them. The parade became a marker of African American service to the nation, a frequent point of reference for those campaigning for civil rights. There were multiple parades that took place throughout the nation, many of these parades included all black regiments, including the 370th from Illinois. Then in the 1920s and 1930s, the 369th was a regular presence on Harlem's streets, each year marching through the neighborhood from their armory to catch a train to their annual summer camp, and then back through the neighborhood on their return two weeks later.

Tap dancer and actor Bill Robinson is frequently claimed to have been the drum major for the regimental band during the homecoming parade on Fifth Avenue upon the 369th's return from overseas. This has however been questioned as it is not mentioned in either his biography by Jim Haskins or the biography of James Europe.

== Interwar period ==
The 369th Infantry was demobilized on 28 February 1919 at Camp Upton. Per the National Defense Act of 1920, it was reconstituted in the National Guard on 19 October 1920 and allotted to the state of New York as a separate regiment. It was partially organized on 11 October 1921 by redesignation of active elements of the 15th Infantry, New York National Guard as the 369th Infantry. The regimental headquarters was organized and federally recognized on 6 September 1924 at Harlem. The regiment was attached on 17 June 1922 to the 44th Division's 87th Infantry Brigade. It conducted annual summer training most years at Camp Smith, near Peekskill, New York, from 1924 to 1939. It was assigned to the First Army on 1 October 1933, but remained attached to the 87th Infantry Brigade for command, control, and administration. In 1938, Benjamin O. Davis Sr. became the regimental commander. He would eventually lead a reorganization that saw the regiment, less the Service Company and 3rd Battalion, converted into the 369th Coast Artillery Regiment (Antiaircraft) on 30 August 1940. The 369th Coast Artillery was attached to the First Army on 30 December 1940. It was inducted into federal service on 13 January 1941 at Harlem, and transferred to Fort Ontario, New York, arriving there on 15 January 1941 where it was assigned to the Northeast Defense Command. It was transferred again on 5 September 1941 to Camp Edwards, Massachusetts.

=== Commanders ===
- Colonel Arthur W. Little - 6 September 1924 – 8 April 1925
- Colonel William A. Taylor - 8 April 1925 – 8 December 1933
- Colonel John G. Grimley - 8 December 1933 – 23 February 1938
- Colonel Joseph A.S. Mundy - 23 February 1938 – 27 August 1938
- Colonel Benjamin O. Davis Sr. (Regular Army) - 27 August 1938 – 25 October 1940
- Colonel Chauncey M. Hooper - 25 October 1940–December 1943

== World War II ==
After U.S. entry into World War II, the 369th Coast Artillery was transferred to Los Angeles, California, on 5 May 1942. It staged at Camp Stoneman, near Pittsburg, California from 1 June until 16 June, when it departed the San Francisco Port of Embarkation, arriving in Hawaii on 21 June. On 12 December 1943, the 369th Coast Artillery was broken up, with the headquarters and headquarters battery redesignated the Headquarters and Headquarters Battery, 369th Antiaircraft Artillery Group, the 1st Battalion as the 369th Antiaircraft Artillery Gun Battalion, and the 2nd Battalion as the 870th Antiaircraft Artillery Automatic Weapons Battalion.

=== 369th Infantry Regiment (Army of the United States) ===
On 15 May 1942, the 369th Infantry Regiment was re-established as an element of the 93rd Infantry Division (Colored) in the Army of the United States; this iteration of the 369th Infantry does not have any lineal connection with the 15th New York established before World War I and that is still active in the present day. It was deployed overseas and participated in labor and security operations in the Southwest Pacific Area. The 369th, along with the rest of the 93rd Infantry Division, occupied Morotai in Dutch New Guinea from April to June 1945, seeing limited combat. The division redeployed to Zamboanga in the Philippines on 1 July 1945, where it conducted "mop up" patrols until the Japanese surrendered on 15 August. The 369th left the Philippines with the division on 17 January 1946, returning to the United States on 1 February. The unit was deactivated two days later.

== Armory ==
In 1933, the 369th Regiment Armory was created to honor the 369th regiment for their service. This armory stands at 142nd and Fifth Avenue, in the heart of Harlem. This armory was constructed starting in the 1920s and was completed in the 1930s. The 369th Regiment Armory was listed on the National Register of Historic Places in 1994 and was designated as a city landmark by the New York City Landmarks Preservation Commission in 1985.

== Later years ==
The infantry's polished post-World War I reputation was not completely safe from external criticism, which ultimately surfaced as a result of ongoing racial tension in the United States. In 1940, the Chicago Defender reported that the United States Department of War arranged for the 369th regiment to be renamed the "Colored Infantry". The department announced that there were too many infantry units in the national guard and the 369th regiment would be among those slated to go, the first alleged step toward abolishing the famed unit. Supporters of the regiment swiftly objected to the introduction of racial identity in the title of a unit in the United States army, effectively preserving the regiment's reputation. However, eventually, all African American US Army units were renamed as "Colored", and the 369th served in World War II as the 369th Coast Artillery Regiment (Antiaircraft) (Colored), with its successor being the 369th Infantry Regiment (Colored).

In 2003, the New York State Department of Transportation renamed the Harlem River Drive as the "Harlem Hellfighters Drive". On 29 September 2006 a twelve-foot-high monument was unveiled to honor the 369th Regiment. This statue is a replica of a monument that stands in France. The monument is made of black granite and contains the 369th crest and rattlesnake insignia.

The Congressional Gold Medal was awarded to the regiment in August 2021 in recognition of their bravery and outstanding service during World War I. The medal legislation was sponsored by U.S. Representatives Thomas Suozzi and Adriano Espaillat.

On June 12, 2025, the infantry was represented in an honor guard ceremony for the late Harlem-based U.S. Congressman Charles Rangel, himself an African American U.S. Army veteran who received military honors during the Korean War.

== Notable soldiers ==
- Benjamin O. Davis Sr.
- James Reese Europe
- Hamilton Fish III
- Susan Elizabeth Frazier
- William Hayward
- Henry Johnson
- Otis Johnson
- Rafael Hernández Marín
- Horace Pippin
- Spotswood Poles
- George Seanor Robb
- Luckey Roberts
- Needham Roberts
- William Jay Schieffelin
- George F. Shiels
- Noble Sissle
- Vertner Woodson Tandy
- John Woodruff

== Distinctive unit insignia ==
Description

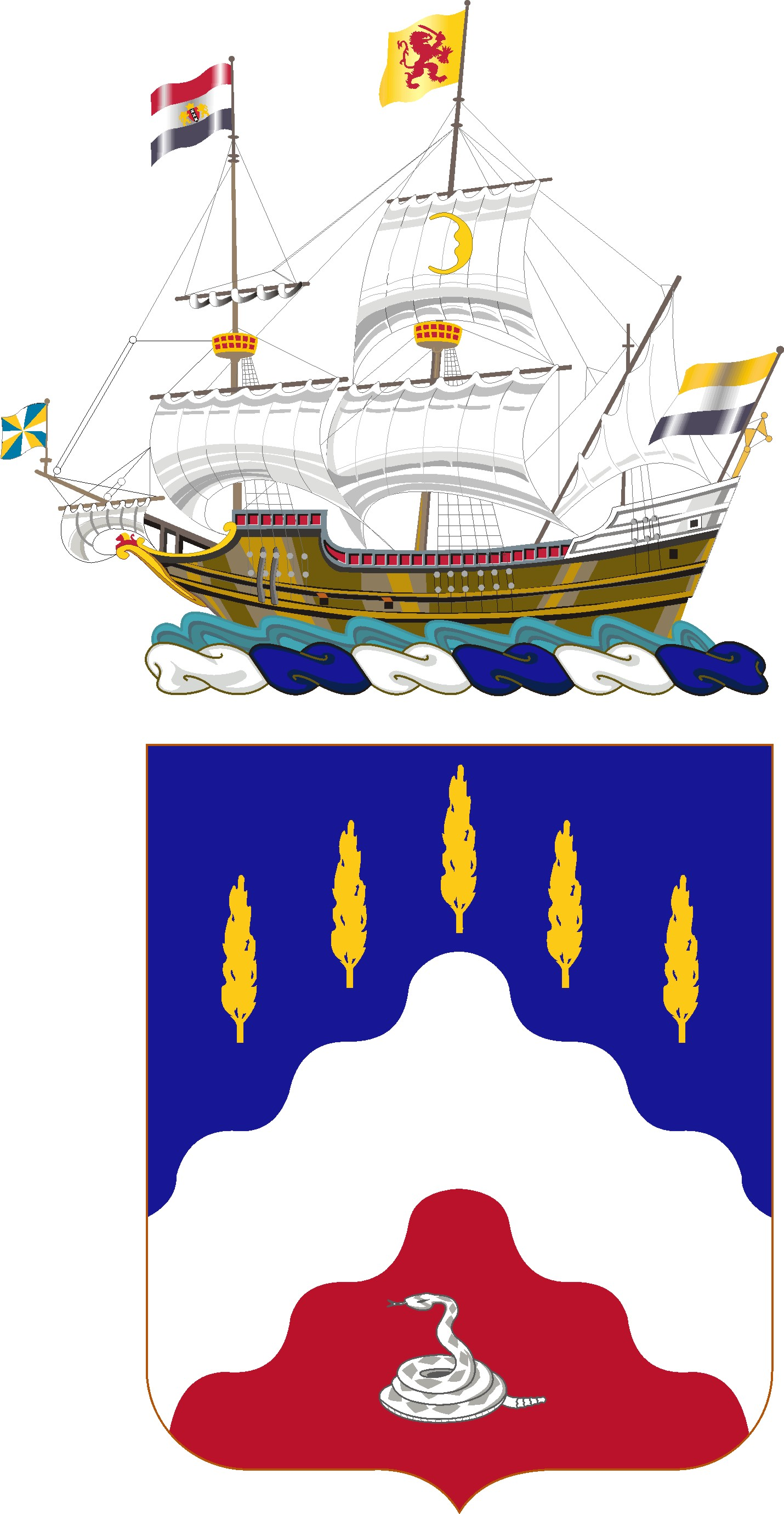
Harlem Hellfighter's crest

A silver color metal and enamel device 1 1/4 inches (3.2 cm) in height overall consisting of a blue shield charged with a silver rattlesnake coiled and ready to strike.

Symbolism

The rattlesnake is a symbol used on some colonial flags and is associated with the thirteen original colonies. The silver rattlesnake on the blue shield was the distinctive regimental insignia of the 369th Infantry Regiment, ancestor of the unit, and alludes to the service of the organization during World War I.

Background

The distinctive unit insignia was originally approved for the 369th Infantry Regiment on 17 April 1923. It was redesignated for the 369th Coast Artillery Regiment on 3 December 1940. It was redesignated for the 369th Antiaircraft Artillery Gun Battalion on 7 January 1944. It was redesignated for the 569th Field Artillery Battalion on 14 August 1956. The insignia was redesignated for the 369th Artillery Regiment on 4 April 1962. It was amended to correct the wording of the description on 2 September 1964. It was redesignated for the 569th Transportation Battalion and amended to add a motto on 13 March 1969. The insignia was redesignated for the 369th Transportation Battalion and amended to delete the motto on 14 January 1975. It was redesignated for the 369th Support Battalion and amended to revise the description and symbolism on 2 November 1994. The insignia was redesignated for the 369th Sustainment Brigade and amended to revise the description and symbolism on 20 July 2007.

== 369th Veterans' Association ==
The 369th Veterans' Association is a group created to honor those who served in the 369th infantry. This veterans group has three distinct goals. According to the Legal Information Institute of the Cornell Law Institute these include, "promoting the principles of friendship and goodwill among its members; engaging in social and civic activities that tend to enhance the welfare of its members and inculcate the true principles of good citizenship in its members; and memorializing, individually and collectively, the patriotic services of its members in the 369th antiaircraft artillery group and other units in the Armed Forces of the United States."

== Depiction in media ==
The 1977 film Men of Bronze is about the Harlem Hellfighters.

Fictionalized accounts which feature the Harlem Hellfighters include the 2014 graphic novel The Harlem Hellfighters written by Max Brooks and illustrated by Caanan White. It depicts a fictionalized account of the 369th's tour in Europe during World War I. As of March 2014 a film adaptation of the aforementioned novel is in the works under Sony Pictures and Overbrook Entertainment.

The Harlem Hellfighters appear in Battlefield 1 during the prologue mission. The unit features as a pre-order bonus as well, featuring a Hellfighter statue. The Hellfighter Pack also features as a pre-order bonus from GameStop, giving players access to unique emblems and weapon skins.

In 2018, the 369th Infantry Regiment became a part of the documentary Noble Sissle's Syncopated Ragtime, directed and produced by Daniel L. Bernardi and David de Rozas with the collaboration of El Dorado Films and the Veteran Documentary Corps. The film subject is musician and Harlem Hellfighters' soldier Noble Sissle, the documentary won Best US Documentary Feature Film at the 2019 American Documentary Film Festival and Film Fund.

The song "Hellfighters", recorded by Swedish power metal band Sabaton for their 2022 album The War to End All Wars, is about the 369th Infantry Regiment.

In the video game Valiant Hearts: Coming Home, the 369th Infantry Regiment is depicted and is to honor those who served in the Harlem Hellfighters during World War I.

Twins Smoke and Stack from the movie Sinners were said to have fought with the unit during World War 1.

== See also ==
- 369th Sustainment Brigade (United States)
- Military history of African Americans
