= Andrea Lewis Miller =

American academic administrator

12th President of LeMoyne–Owen College
- In office September 1, 2015 – September 1, 2019
- Preceded by: Johnnie B. Watson
- Succeeded by: Carol Johnson-Dean (interim)

Personal details
- Education: LeMoyne–Owen College; Clark Atlanta University

Andrea Lewis Miller is an American academic administrator who served as the 12th president of LeMoyne–Owen College from 2015 to 2019. She was its first female president.

== Life ==
Miller is from Memphis, Tennessee. She completed a B.S. in biology from LeMoyne–Owen College in 1976. She earned a M.S. (1978) and Ph.D. in cell and developmental biology from Clark Atlanta University. Her master's thesis was titled, The effects of the l-proline analog, l-azetidine-2-carboxylic acid, on the morphogenesis of feathers in developing chick embryos. Roy Hunter Jr. was her academic advisor. She completed postdoctoral studies at the University of Cincinnati College of Medicine.

Miller was an assistant dean in the college of human and community sciences at the University of Nevada, Reno. For six years, she was the vice president for academic affairs and dean of faculty at LeMoyne–Owen College. She was the provost and executive vice president for academic and student affairs at Southwest Tennessee Community College for six years. She was chancellor of Sowela Technical Community College from 2007 to 2012. In December 2011, she became chancellor of Baton Rouge Community College. On September 1, 2015, she became the 12th president of LeMoyne-Owen College, succeeding Johnnie B. Watson. She is the first woman and second alumnus to serve in the role. In June 2017, she received a vote of no-confidence from its 51 full-time faculty members. Her term as president ended on September 1, 2019. She was succeeded by interim president Carol Johnson-Dean. In 2019, she joined AMEC Group, Inc. as its president and chief executive officer.
