= Green Polonius Hamilton =

American educator

Green Polonius Hamilton (1867–1932) was an American educator, principal, and author who was prominent in the African-American community of Memphis, Tennessee.

Hamilton was born in Memphis and graduated from LeMoyne Normal Institute in 1882. He taught and then continued his education at Rust College and Columbia University before becoming principal at the first Memphis high school for African Americans, Kortrecht School. He was married to Alice Richmond Hamilton.

He chronicled Memphis' African American community at the start of the 20th century in his books Bright Side of Memphis (1908) and Beacons of the Race (1911).

Hamilton High School, Hamilton Middle School, and Hamilton Elementary School in Memphis are named for him.

== Bibliography ==
- The Bright Side of Memphis: A Compendium of Information Concerning the Colored People of Memphis, Tennessee, Showing Their Achievements in Business, Industrial and Professional Life and Including Articles of General Interest on the Race (1908)
- Beacon Lights of the Race, F. H. Clarke and Bros., Memphis (1911)
