= George F. Shiels =

American physician

George Franklin Shiels
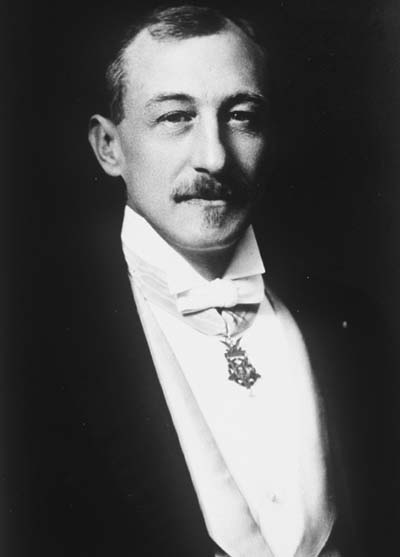
- George F. Shiels, Medal of Honor recipient
- Born: April 13, 1863; San Francisco, California, US
- Died: October 26, 1943 (aged 80); Palo Alto, California, US
- Burial place: Cypress Lawn Memorial Park
- Military career
- Allegiance: United States
- Branch: United States Army
- Service years: 1898–1900, 1917–1919
- Rank: Major
- Nickname: The Fighting Doctor
- Unit: Army Medical Corps
- Conflicts: Philippine–American War; World War I
- Awards: Medal of Honor; Distinguished Service Cross; Croix de Guerre

George Franklin Shiels (April 13, 1863 – October 26, 1943) was a surgeon in the United States Army and a Medal of Honor recipient for his actions in the Philippine–American War.

== Early life ==
George Franklin Shiels was born on April 13, 1863, in San Francisco, California, to William Shiels and Sarah Esdale Lynham. Little is known of his childhood. He graduated from the Military College in Ossening, New York and then attended the University of Edinburg where he earned a Bachelor of Medicine and a Master of Surgery. His thesis at the University of Edinburg was "On the Effects of Tobacco on Those Using it as a Luxury." He joined the US Army Medical Volunteer Corps as a surgeon on the 8 July 1898, and he deployed to the Philippines with the Volunteer Medical Corps, serving until 1899. In 1902 he married Emily Montague Bibby Mead in Manhattan, NY.

== Medal of Honor ==
Rank and organization: Surgeon, U.S. Volunteers.
Place and date: At Tuliahan River, Philippine Islands, March 25, 1899.
Entered service at: California.
Birth: California.
Date of issue: November 22, 1906.

Citation:

Voluntarily exposed himself to the fire of the enemy and went with 4 men to the relief of 2 native Filipinos Iying wounded about 150 yards in front of the lines and personally carried one of them to a place of safety.

== Silver Star ==
Rank and Organization: Surgeon, 369th Infantry Regiment
Place and Date: Fontaine, France, 29 September 1918

Citation: By direction of the President, under the provisions of the act of Congress approved July 9, 1918 (Bul. No. 43, W.D., 1918), Major G. Franklin Shiels, Medical Department, United States Army, is cited for gallantry in action and is entitled to wear a silver star on the Victory Medal ribbon as prescribed by Paragraph 1, G.O. 75, c. s., these headquarters. For gallantry in action at Fontaine, France, 29 September 1918, in caring for the wounded under heavy shell fire. General Orders: GHQ, American Expeditionary Forces, Citation Orders No. 5 (June 3, 1919) https://achh.army.mil/regiment/silverstar-wwi-wwi-qs

== Philippine Insurrection ==
Major Shiels served as a surgeon in the US Volunteer Medical Corps in the Philippines. During that service period, Major Shiels was cited for action above and beyond the call of duty placing himself in mortal danger on the battlefield while rescuing and treating wounded soldiers while under direct fire. For his valorous actions, he was awarded the Medal of Honor by President Theodore Roosevelt on the 22nd of November, 1906. After returning from the Philippines Major Shiels retired from military service and resumed his civilian life as a surgeon.

== Interwar years ==
Now known as "The Fighting Doctor," Dr. Shiels returned to civilian life as a surgeon and was appointed Professor of Surgery of Gunshot Wounds and Military Medicine at Fordham University in New York City. He was considered an expert at legal medicine, and was an expert witness at the murder trial of Harry W. Thaw (who had murdered architect Stanford White in Manhattan's Madison Square Garden), supporting the first use of the temporary insanity defense. He also testified as an expert witness in the Fatty Arbuckle murder trial, in that case offering his opinion on the medical condition afflicting the victim prior to her murder. Dr. Shiels was a prolific contributor to medical journals, writing on wide ranging subjects including the nature of Colic, the proper teaching of anatomy, the role of the physician as an expert witness, and closure of surgical wounds.

== World War I ==
At the outset of WWI, Dr. Shiels volunteered again for service, and was re-commissioned as a Major. He received a special order to serve in Major General Pershing's forces in France, where he was assigned to the 369th Infantry Regiment, known as the Harlem Hellfighters. His actions on September 27–30, 1918, earned him the French Croix de Guerre and the Silver Star.

== Post military service ==
George was discharged in October 1919 and went on to become the professor of clinical surgery at the University of California, San Francisco and at Fordham University of New York. He married twice, first to Emily, and last to Grace (who had been married twice before with one child), and had no children with either wife.

The Honolulu-Star Bulletin December 5, 1930, printed a short entry about Dr. Shiels embarking on "a trip to the orient" in which he is referred to as "Colonel" although records have not yet been found corroborating a promotion. The same article states that Dr. Shiels "is traveling to recuperate from being gassed in the World War." Again this has not yet been corroborated independently, and there is no record of a Purple Heart Medal.

George Franklin Shiels died on October 26, 1943.

== See also ==
- List of Medal of Honor recipients
- List of Philippine–American War Medal of Honor recipients
