= Hamilton Heights Historic District =

Historic district in Manhattan, New York

- U.S. National Register of Historic Places
- U.S. Historic district
- New York State Register of Historic Places
- New York City Landmark
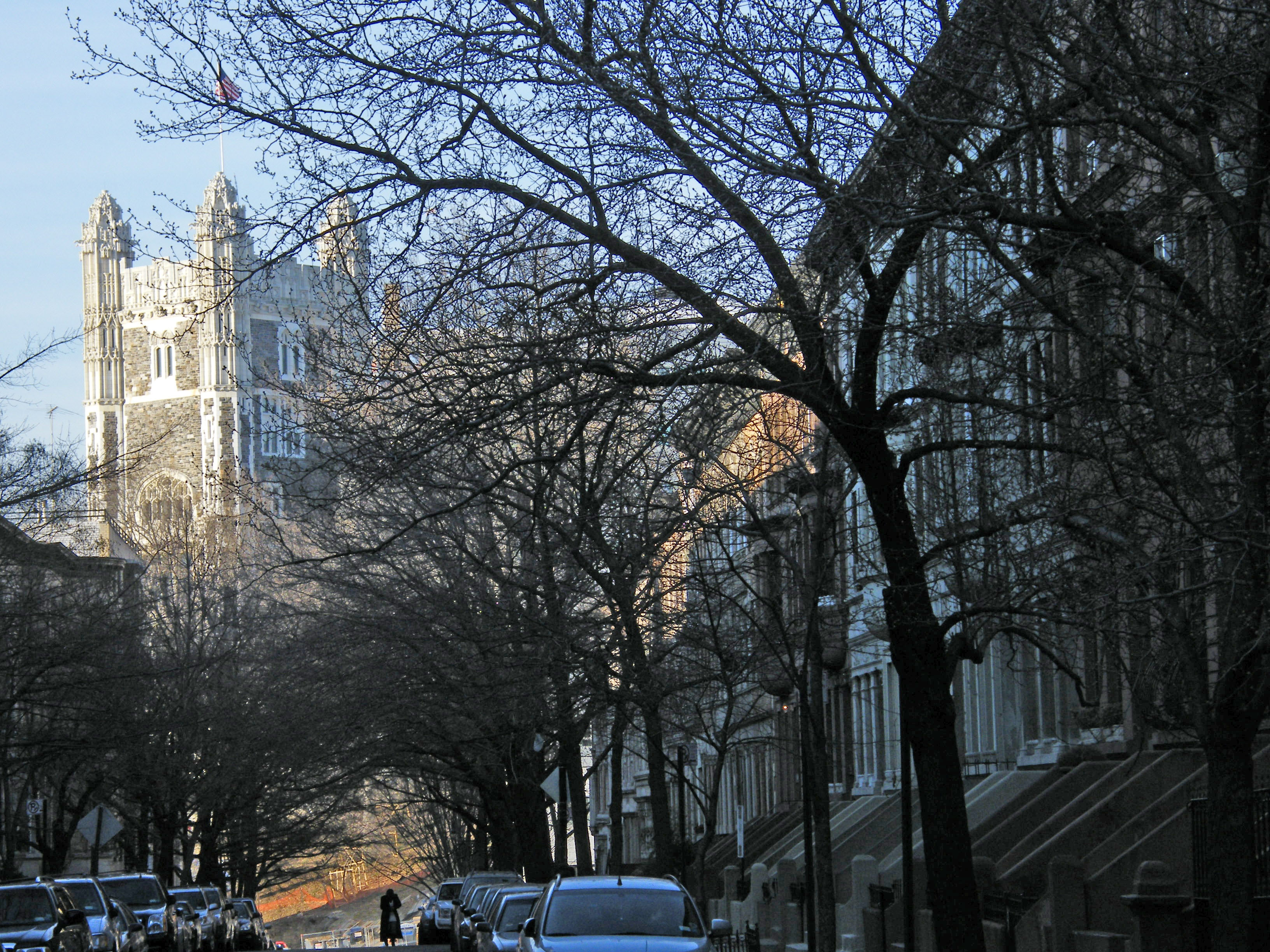
- Hamilton Heights Historic District, March 2009

- Location within New York City
- Location: Roughly bounded by St. Nicholas and Amsterdam Aves, W. 145 and W. 140th Sts., New York, New York
- Coordinates: 40°49′21″N 73°56′54″W
- Area: 0 acres (0 ha)
- Built: 1886
- Architect: Multiple
- Architectural style: Queen Anne, Romanesque Revival, Beaux Arts
- NRHP reference No.: 83001727

Significant dates
- Added to NRHP: September 30, 1983
- Designated NYSRHP: August 4, 1983
- Designated NYCL: November 26, 1974

The Hamilton Heights Historic District is a national historic district in Hamilton Heights, New York, New York. It consists of 192 contributing residential rowhouses, apartment buildings, and churches built between about 1886 and 1931. Most are three and four story brick rowhouses set behind raised stone terraces. The three churches within the district are St. Luke's, the Convent Avenue Baptist Church, and St. James Presbyterian Church. Architectural styles include Queen Anne, Romanesque, and Beaux-Arts.

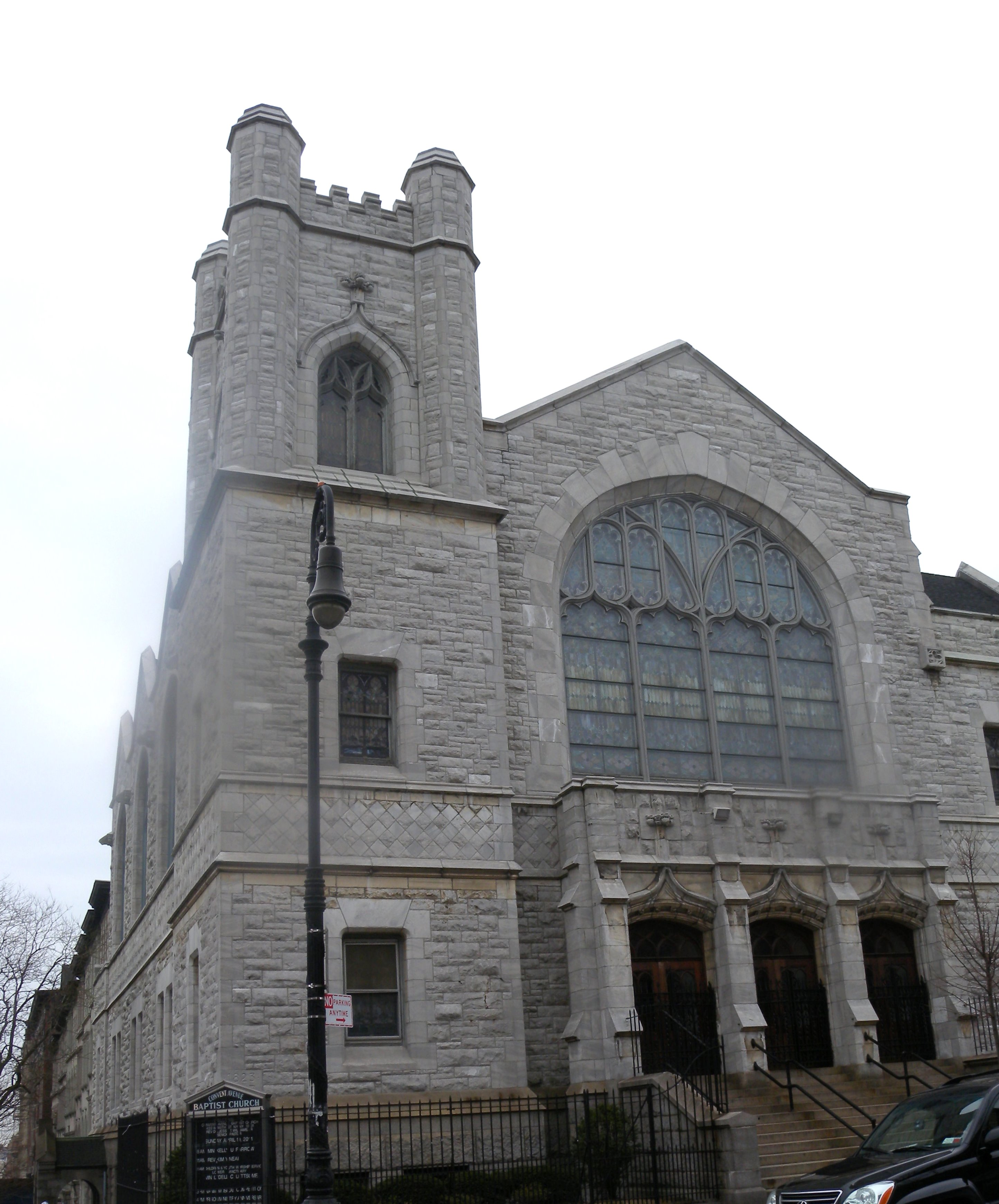
Convent Avenue Baptist Church

It was listed on the National Register of Historic Places in 1983.
