= Bert M. Roddy =

Bert Maynard Roddy (born August 19, 1886 - died 1963) founded a chain of grocery stores and was the first African American owner of a grocery store chain in Memphis, Tennessee. He was involved in the Lincoln League. He was born in Augusta, Arkansas August 19, 1886. His parents were Jerry and Harriette McKenny Roddy. After his family moved to Memphis he attended LeMoyne Normal School. He cofounded the Coloured Citizens Association, was an organizer of a theater, cofounded a restaurant, organized and was the first president of the Memphis NAACP chapter, and was involved in various African American civic and business groups.
