= Tandy & Foster =

American architectural firm (1908–1914)

- Industry: Architecture
- Founded: 1908; 118 years ago
- Founders: Vertner Woodson Tandy; George Washington Foster
- Defunct: 1914
- Headquarters: New York, New York, United States

Tandy & Foster was an American architectural firm active from 1908 to 1914 in New York and New Jersey, based in New York City.

Founded in 1908 by Vertner Woodson Tandy (1885–1949) and George Washington Foster (1866–1923). Tandy was the first African-American architect licensed by the State of New York and Foster was among the first African-American architects licensed by the State of New Jersey in 1908, and later New York (1916). Tandy and Foster dissolved their partnership in 1914 and thereafter both practiced privately, Foster attaining his license in New York by 1915.

== Works ==
- St. Philip's Episcopal Church (Harlem, New York) (1910), 204 West 134th Street
- Steele Hall (Memphis, TN) 1914 LeMoyne-Owen College.
