= Odom =

Odom is a surname originating from England. Notable people with the surname include:

- Amari Odom (living), American football player
- Andrew Odom (1936–1991), American blues singer and songwriter
- Antwan Odom (born 1981), American former football player
- Barry Odom (born 1976), American football coach and former player
- Bernard Odom, professional name of Bernard Odum (1932–2004), American bass guitarist
- Bob Odom (1935–2014), Louisiana Commissioner of Agriculture and Forestry
- Brian Odom (born 1981), American football coach and former player
- Caleb Odom (born 2005), American football player
- Carmen Hooker Odom (born 1945), American former state government agency head
- Chris Odom (born 1994), American football player
- Christopher C. Odom (born 1970), American film director
- Chuka Odom (born 1960), Nigerian lawyer and politician
- Cliff Odom (born 1958), American former football player
- Darrell Odom (born 1954 or 1955), American politician, soldier and firefighter
- Dave Odom (born 1942), American basketball coach
- Dave Odom (baseball) (1918–1987), American baseball player
- David Odom (living), U.S. Marine Corps Lieutenant General and Director of Operations at the Joint Staff
- DeWayne Odom (born 1968), American former football player
- Deworski Odom (born 1977), American former sprinter
- Duncan Odom (living), American researcher and research group leader
- Edward Odom (born 1853), American barber and politician
- Elijah B. Odom (1859–1924), American businessman and physician
- Elzie Odom (1929–2025), American politician, community activist and postal worker
- Frederick M. Odom (c. 1871–1960), Justice of the Louisiana Supreme Court
- Gary Odom (born 1951), American politician
- George Odom (disambiguation), several people
- Heinie Odom (1900–1970), American baseball player
- Hang Serei Odom (1970–2012), Cambodian journalist
- Henry Odom (born 1959), American former football player
- James B. Odom (born 1933 or 1934), American NASA engineer and program manager
- Jason Odom (born 1974), American football player
- Jerry Odom (disambiguation), several people
- Jim Odom (1921–1989), American baseball umpire
- Joe Odom (born 1979), American former football player
- Joe Odom (attorney) (1948–1991), American attorney-turned-musician
- John Odom (disambiguation), several people
- Joseph Odom (born 1992), American former professional baseball catcher
- Kenyatta Odom (1983–1988), American murder victim
- Lamar Odom (born 1979), American former basketball player
- Leaonna Odom (born 1998), American basketball player
- Leslie Odom Jr. (born 1981), American actor, singer and songwriter
- Lometa Odom (1933–2017), American basketball player and coach
- Mary H. Odom (1921–2014), American educator, journalist, politician and postal worker
- Mel Odom (disambiguation), several people
- Rod Odom (born 1991), American basketball player
- Ryan Odom (born 1974), American basketball coach and former player
- Sam Odom (1919–1977), American baseball player
- Sammy Odom (1941–2001), American football player
- Spencer Odom (1913–1962), American pianist-arranger
- Steve Odom (born 1952), American football player
- Susan Odom (1980–2021), American chemistry professor
- Teri W. Odom (born 1970s), American chemist and materials scientist
- Tyler Odom, American rock guitarist, member of Northstar (rock band)
- Vernon Odom (born 1948), American journalist
- Vernon Odom Sr. (1921–1996), American civil rights leader
- William Eldridge Odom (1932–2008), former director of the U.S. National Security Agency
- William M. Odom (c. 1885–1942), American academic
- William Odom, birth name of William M. Rainach (1913–1978), American businessman and politician

== See also ==
- Odom's indicator, a piece of anesthetic equipment
- Odum (disambiguation)
