= Prince Gardner =

American politician

Prince Gardner was a state legislator in Alabama. He served in the Alabama House of Representatives in 1874 until he was unseated.

In 1872 he was documented as a teacher in Barbour County. He was a leader of the African Methodist Episcopal (A.M.E.) church in Russell County, Alabama. He served in the Alabama House of Representatives in 1874. representing Russell County, Alabama.

He and D. J. Daniels, an African American, were unseated. Petitioners contesting their election states that 1,500 of their votes were illegal. Allen E. Williams, Edward Odum, and Adam Gachet, representatives of Barbour County, Alabama, were also ousted from the Alabama House of Representatives.

He was a signatory on a Memorial of the Republican Members of the Legislature of Alabama to the Congress of the United States.

== See also ==
- Election Riot of 1874
- African American officeholders from the end of the Civil War until before 1900
