= Comer =

Comer is Portuguese and Spanish for the verb to eat. It may also refer to:

== People ==
- Anjanette Comer (born 1939), American actress
- Braxton Bragg Comer (1848-1927), American politician
- Brent Comer, American actor
- Brian Comer (born 1985), Canadian politician
- Brian Comer, Irish businessman; see Luke and Brian Comer
- Christine Comer, former Director of Science in the curriculum division of the Texas Education Agency (TEA)
- Douglas Earl Comer, computer scientist, professor at Purdue University
- Emma Comer, Australian politician
- Gary Comer (1927-2006), entrepreneur and founder of clothing retailer Lands' End
- George Comer (1858-1937), American polar explorer and whaler
- Hugh Comer (1842-1900), American businessman
- J. W. Comer (1845-1919), American businessman
- James Comer (born 1972), US Representative from Kentucky
- James P. Comer, American professor of child psychiatry
- Jodie Comer (born 1993), English actress
- John Comer (1924-1984), English actor, best known for Last of the Summer Wine
- Kevin Comer (born 1992), American baseball player
- Luke Comer, Irish businessman; see Luke and Brian Comer
- Mary Elizabeth Comer (1928–2008), American political strategist
- Samuel M. Comer (1893-1974), movie set decorator
- Thomas Comer (1790-1862), British actor

== Places ==
- Comer, Georgia, United States, a city in Madison County

== See also ==
- Franz Commer (1813-1887), German composer
- Commer, British commercial vehicle manufacturer active 1905–1979
- Commer, Mayenne, commune, France
- Comercial Mexicana, nicknamed "La Comer"
- Committee on Monetary and Economic Reform, Canada
