= Kummer =

Kummer is a German surname. Notable people with the surname include:

- Bernhard Kummer (1897–1962), German Germanist
- Clare Kummer (1873–1958), American composer, lyricist and playwright
- Clarence Kummer (1899–1930), American jockey
- Christopher Kummer (born 1975), German economist
- Corby Kummer (born 1957), American journalist
- Dirk Kummer (born 1966), German actor, director, and screenwriter
- Eberhard Kummer (1940–2019), Austrian concert singer, lawyer, and medieval music expert
- Eduard Kummer, also known as the following Ernst Kummer
- Eloise Kummer (1916–2008), American actress
- Ernst Kummer (1810–1893), German mathematician
  - Kummer configuration, a mathematical structure discovered by Ernst
  - Kummer surface, a related geometrical structure discovered by Ernst
- Ferdinand von Kummer (1816–1900), German general
- Frederic Arnold Kummer (1873–1943), American author, playwright, and screenwriter
- Friedrich August Kummer (1797–1879), German cellist and composer
- Karl Kummer (disambiguation), more than one person
- Kaspar Kummer (1795–1870), German flautist and composer
- Lilian Kummer (born 1975), Swiss skier
- Luise Kummer (born 1993), German biathlete
- Mario Kummer (born 1962), German cyclist
- Nicolas Kummer (1882–1954), Luxembourgish gymnast
- Paul Kummer (1834–1912), priest, taxonomist of Zerbst
- Patrizia Kummer (born 1987), Swiss snowboarder
- Samuel Kummer (1968–2024), German organist
- Siegfried Adolf Kummer (1899–1977), German mystic and Germanic revivalist
- Sigrud Kummer, (born ? ), German sprint canoeist
- Thomas Kummer (born 1963), American classicist and teacher
- Thomas John Kummer (1933–1969), American hair stylist known as Jay Sebring
- Tilo Kummer (born 1968), German politician
- Tom Kummer (born 1963), Swiss journalist
- Wolfgang Kummer (disambiguation), more than one person

== See also ==
- Cummer (disambiguation)
- Kommer
