= Edward Odom =

American politician (1853-?)

Edward Odom (born 1853) was an American politician and barber.

He was first elected to the Alabama House of Representatives in 1872. His 1874 election as a legislator from Barbour County, and that of fellow state representatives Adam Gachet and A. E. Williams, were overturned in the house.

He testified about violent organized attacks on Republican voters in Eufaula, Alabama, arrests, jailings, and intimidation. He testified that Republican meetings were disrupted by Democrats and Republican leaders forced to leave the area due to threats.

== See also ==
- Election Riot of 1874
- African American officeholders from the end of the Civil War until before 1900
