= Spring Hill Methodist Church =

Historic church in Alabama, United States

- U.S. National Register of Historic Places
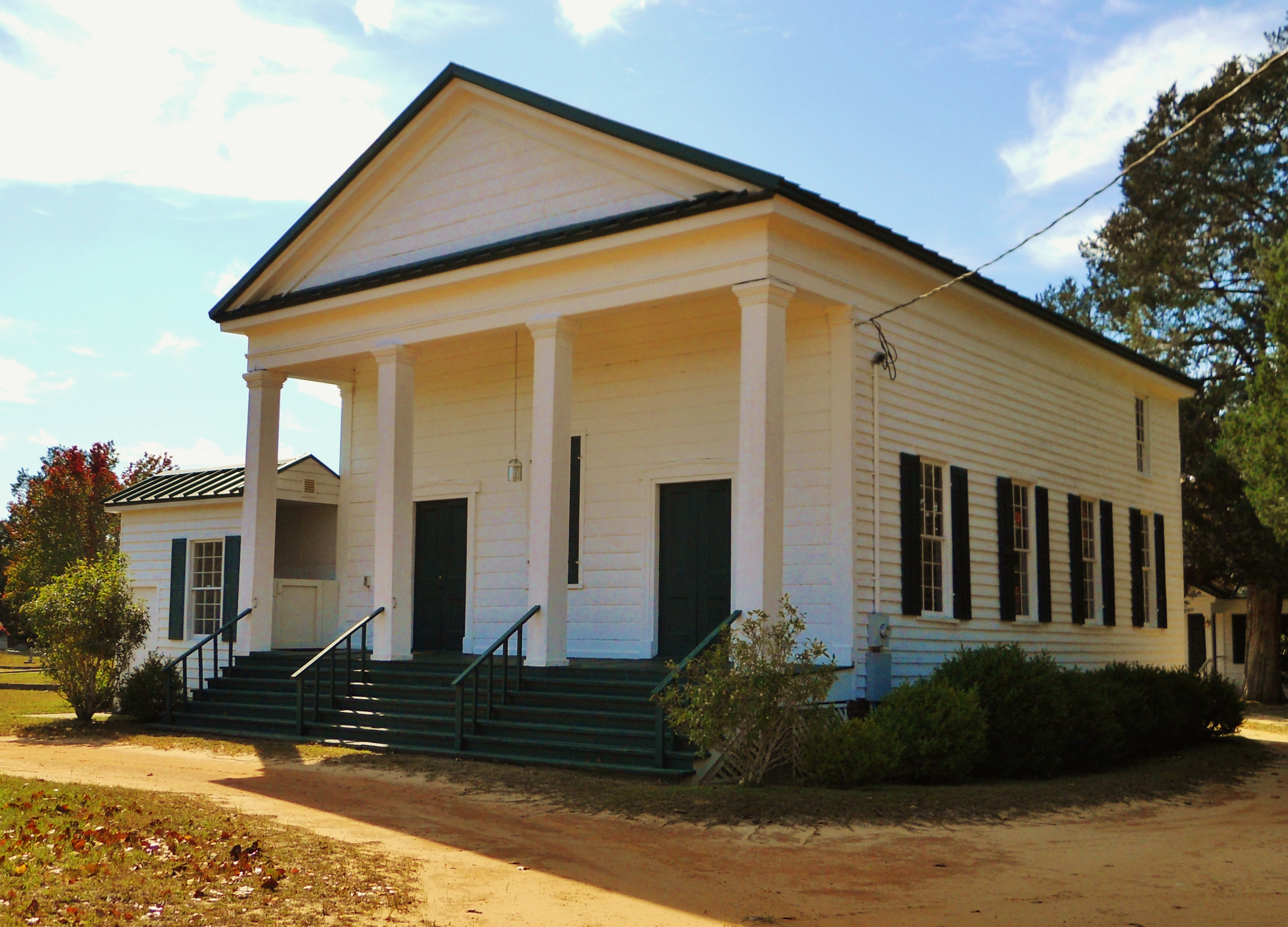

- Location within Alabama Location within the United States
- Location: Co. Rd. 89 S side, approximately 750 ft. W of jct. with Co. Rd. 49, Spring Hill, Alabama
- Coordinates: 32.08021°N 85.33931°W
- Area: 14 acres (5.7 ha)
- Built: 1841
- Architectural style: Greek Revival
- NRHP reference No.: 96000110
- Added to NRHP: February 16, 1996

Spring Hill Methodist Church is a historic Methodist church on County Road 89 on the south side, approximately 750 feet west of the junction with County Rd. 49 in Spring Hill, Alabama, United States. The Greek Revival church was built in 1841 by John Fletcher Comer, father of Alabama Governor B. B. Comer. It was added to the National Register of Historic Places in 1996.
