= Odum =

Odum may refer to:

== People ==
- Bernard Odum (1932-2004), American bass guitar player
- Ernest J. Odum (1882-1919), American lawyer and politician
- Ethma Odum (1931-2009), American television personality with KALB-TV
- Eugene Odum (1913-2002), American ecologist
- George Odum (born 1993), American football player
- Howard T. Odum (1924–2002), American ecologist
- Howard W. Odum (1884-1954), American sociologist
- Igwegbe Odum (late 1800s-1940), Nigerian politician
- Jake Odum (born 1991), American basketball player and coach
- Joseph R. Odum (1913-1942), United States Navy sailor and Silver Star recipient
- Kasper Ødum (born 1979), Danish badminton player

== Other ==
- Odum, Georgia, a town in the state of Georgia in the United States
- USS Odum (APD-71), U.S. Navy high-speed transport
- The Ghanaian name for the iroko, an African hardwood tree

== See also ==
- Odom, a surname
