= Allen Williams =

Allen Williams may refer to:

- J. Allen Williams (born 1960), American animator, writer and director
- Allen Williams (actor) (1944–2019), American actor
- Allen Williams (American football) (born 1972), American football player
- Allen E. Williams, state legislator in Alabama
- Allen Lane (Allen Lane Williams, 1902–1970), British publisher

== See also ==
- Allan Williams (1930–2016), British businessman and promoter
- Allan Williams (politician) (1922–2011), British Columbia politician
