= Cummer =

Cummer may refer to:

- Cummer, County Galway, a civil parish in Ireland
- Anna Cummer (born 1977), Canadian actress
- Ninah Cummer, namesake of the Cummer Museum of Art and Gardens in Florida, United States

Places in Toronto, Canada:

- Cummer Avenue, North York
- Cummer Valley Middle School, North York
- Old Cummer GO Station, North York

== See also ==
- Kummer (surname)
- Comer (disambiguation)
