= Bibb Manufacturing Company =

Textile company in Georgia

Bibb Manufacturing Company (The Bibb Company)
- Industry: Textiles
- Founder: Major John F. Hanson, Isaac N. Hanson, and Hugh M. Comer
- Defunct: 1998
- Fate: Closed
- Headquarters: Macon, Georgia, United States
- Products: Sheets, bedspreads, curtains, towels, comforters, industrial cord

Bibb Manufacturing Company was a textile company founded in Macon, Georgia, in 1876 and was sold to Dan River in 1998. Bibb Manufacturing Company, also known as "The Bibb Company" produced cotton products such as sheets, comforters, towels, curtains, and bedspreads. Bibb Manufacturing not only provided jobs for its employees but also medical care, schools, housing, and social workers to organize clubs, trips, and other events.

== Background ==
On 25 February 1876, Georgia Governor James Smith approved the incorporation of the Bibb Manufacturing Company. The charter request originated from three men; Major John F. Hanson, Isaac N. Hanson, and Hugh M. Comer. Once it was approved, these same three men became the directors of Bibb Manufacturing Company. Comer was elected president, J. Hanson secretary treasurer, and I. Hanson was in charge of the business office.

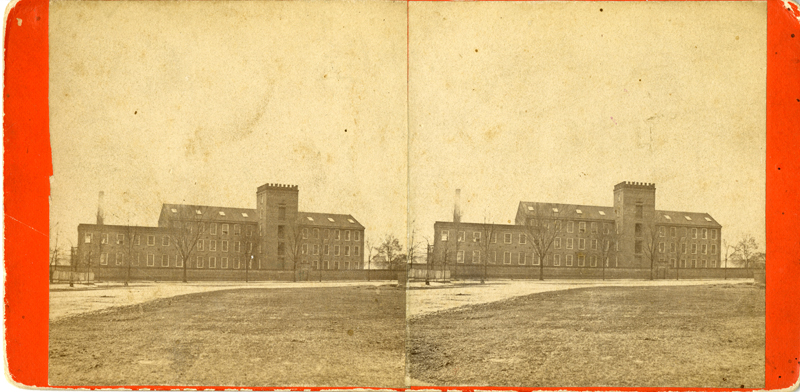
Bibb Mill Two – Macon, GA – 1877

Shortly thereafter, J. Hanson went before the Mayor and City Council of Macon, Georgia and demanded that the company be exempted from taxes before they would agree to start the business in Macon. The exemption was granted for 99 years.

== Early years ==
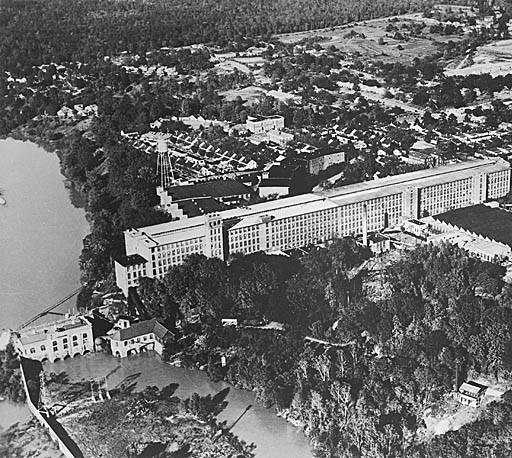
Columbus Plant – Columbus, GA – 1915

The first real estate acquired by the company was an old freight house in east Macon. The adjoining 101.59 acres were also purchased. After some immediate success, Bibb purchased a mill in west Macon that had been owned by Macon Manufacturing. This transaction was completed in 1878. These two mills were then named Bibb Mill Number One and Bibb Mill Number Two. In 1880 the business office was moved from Number One Mill to 111 Third St. The following year the company sold its first stock to Muir and Duckworth, increasing their capital to $150,000.

By 1878, the company had 16,500 spindles and 140 looms. It goods were sold through James Reynolds and Company in New York.

In 1898, Bibb merged with Macon Knitting Company, Taylor Manufacturing (near Reynolds, Ga), the Cordele Manufacturing Company, and Porterdale Mills. Stock at this point was valued at $1.4 million.

In 1900, Bibb bought the Columbus Power Company. The Columbus Power Company included a spindle mill and a dam that generated power for the mill. In 1906, the power company portion was sold, but the mill and 51 acres around the mill were retained. A new mill, the Columbus Mill, was built and, along with the surrounding land, was incorporated into Bibb City. Also in 1900, the Cordele Manufacturing Company was sold.

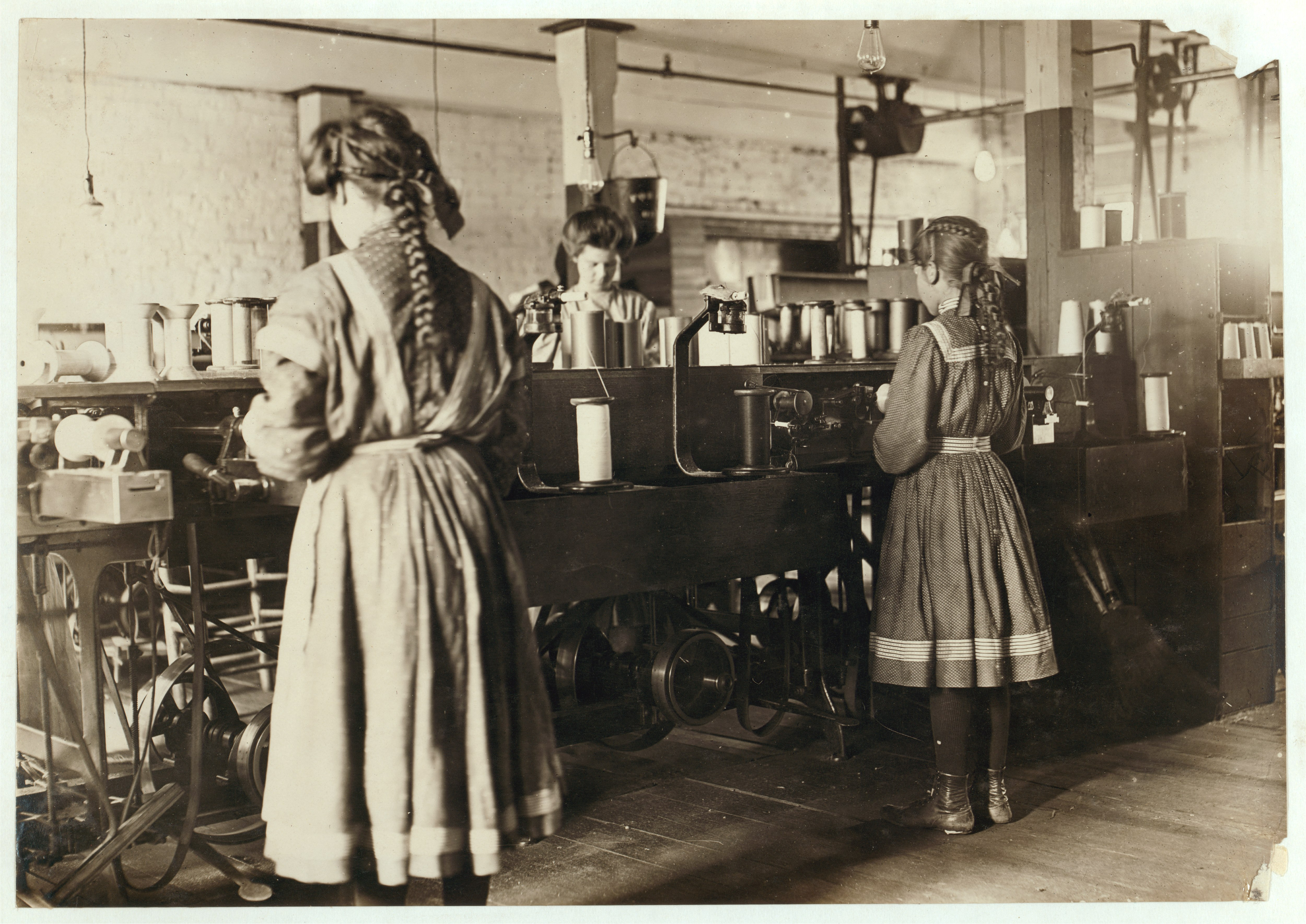
Spool cotton department – Bibb Manufacturing – Mill 1 – Macon, GA

In 1927, Bibb bought Payne Cotton Mills. This transaction was initiated in 1904 when J. Hanson recognized an opportunity to acquire the mill after the mill began to suffer from financial difficulties. The transaction was complicated, full of errors, and took nearly 23 years to complete. In 1919, employees of the mill requested that the land and mill be incorporated as a city. This included the mill, employee houses, gardens, and a community center. The incorporation was approved in April 1919 and Payne City became a city within Macon, Georgia.

== Mill life ==
Bibb Manufacturing provided its employees with more than just a job and income. In the communities surrounding some plants, mill villages were built that included housing for employees and company stores. Education was also part of the benefits provided. In 1950, Bibb Manufacturing operated five schools at mill locations outside of Macon. They also operated 19 vocational schools to teach employees how to properly operate equipment. Any church denomination could build a church in mill communities on free land. Bibb Manufacturing would pay one-third of the cost of construction. In 1950, there were six churches at Bibb mill communities with a membership of 2400.

Bibb Manufacturing also took care of its employees' health. They operated six free clinics with nine doctors and eight nurses. In 1950, 15,000 employees used this free medical service. The nurses also would visit sick people in their homes. At the Porterdale plant, the company maintained a hospital with 20 beds.

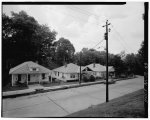
Mill Village Houses – Columbus, GA

Social life was an important part of the Bibb mill communities. As of 1950, the company employed six social workers who were in charge of the social activities in the mill communities. They organized clubs such as women's clubs, Boy Scouts, and Girl Reserves. They also organized camps, fishing trips, and vacation trips to the Atlantic and Florida. The social workers managed the creation of athletic teams such as baseball, softball, swimming, and football. In 1949, over 100,000 people watched the various athletic games. At the Porterdale and Columbus plants, the company maintained two gyms. In other locations, there were four auditoriums for social events, banquets, and entertainment.

== Products ==
The product line for Bibb Manufacturing included sheets, comforters, bedspreads, towels, curtains for both consumers and hotels, and carpet yarn. They also manufactured industrial textiles to be used in automobile hoses and conveyor belts.

In 1942, Bibb Manufacturing announced the creation of a heat resistant cotton tire cord. One of the purposes for this invention was to conserve rubber that was in limited supply at the time. This cotton cord also was meant to replace rayon that was being used for the war.

Some of Bibb Manufacturing's later success was a result of licensed kids products. The more prominent licenses included Star Wars, Barney the Dinosaur, The Mighty Morphin' Power Rangers, and The Lion King. Other licenses included 101 Dalmatians, Casper the Friendly Ghost, Sailor Moon and Batman. The inability to properly manage the volatility of these licensed products contributed to the demise of Bibb Manufacturing.

== Closure ==
In 1985 Thomas Foley created the NTC Group which acquired Bibb using a junk-bond financed leveraged buy-out. This buyout took Bibb from a publicly held firm to privately held. From 1992 – 1995, NTC collected $3 – $4 million a year in management fees.

In 1995, Bibb's $160 million in junk bonds were downgraded to the lowest possible rating. The company's earnings for this year were expected to be $15 million, however, they owed $26 million in interest payments.

In 1997, Bibb Manufacturing sold its terry division to West Point Stevens. This included the Rosemary plant which was acquired in 1988 from J.P. Stevens.

In 1998, Dan River, Inc agreed to buy Bibb Manufacturing for approximately $250 million. Two years later, the Macon office of Bibb Manufacturing was closed. The building in East Macon which was once the company headquarters was sold to the city of Macon. The city has since leased the building to the Secretary of the State to be used for Examining Board offices.

== Plants and locations ==
Bibb Manufacturing Plants
Plant	Location	Opened/Acquired	Closed or Sold
Abbeville/ Calhoun Falls	Abbeville County, SC		1995
Anderson	Columbus, GA	1937	
Arnall	Sargent, GA	1964	1986
Arnco	Newnan, GA	1964	1998
Bellevue	Macon, GA	1960	1986
Bibb Mill One	Macon, GA		1985
Bibb Mill Two	Macon, GA		
Brookneal	Brookneal, VA		2005
Camellia	Juliette, GA		1998
Cherokee	Forsyth, GA		1985
Columbus	Columbus, GA	1900	1998
Cordele	Cordele, GA	1898	1900
Forsyth	Forsyth, GA		1985
Fort Valley	Fort Valley, GA		
Goldsboro	Goldsboro, NC		
Greensboro	Greensboro, NC		
LaGrange	LaGrange, GA		
Laurel	Pottersville, GA		
Macon Knitting Mill	Macon, GA	1898	
Newnan	Newnan, GA		1970
Osprey	Porterdale, GA	1898	
Payne	Payne City, GA	1916 (legally 1927)	
Reynolds	Reynolds, GA	1898	
Roanoke II	Roanoke Rapids, NC		1997
Rosemary	Roanoke Rapids, NC		1997
Whitehorse	Greenville, SC		

== Leadership ==
Presidents:

- Hugh Moss Comer 1876–1900
- John Hanson −1900–1908
- W.T. Hanson 1908–1909
- G. Gunby Jordan: 1909–1913
- E. T. Comer: 1913–1919
- William D. Anderson 1919–1936
- William D. Anderson, Jr. 1936–1937
- William D. Anderson – 1937–1941
- Scott Russell 1941–1943
- William D. Anderson 1943–1947
- Charles Hertwig 1947–1956
- Robert Train 1956–1970
- William S. Manning 1970–1986
- Roland Knight – 1986–1987
- Alan Davis 1987–1992
- Edgar Davis 1992–1994
- Thomas Foley 1995–1998

== Bibliography ==
- Anderson, Wm. D. (1950). A Bench Mark: Bibb Manufacturing Company. North America: The Newconen Society. pp. 15–17.
- Andrews, Mildred Gwin (1987). The Men and the Mills. Macon, Georgia: Mercer University Press. pp. 10, 32, 107–108, 171, 196. ISBN 0-86554-289-9.
- Anderson, Nancy (21 January 2003). "Macon". New Georgia Encyclopedia. University of Georgia Press.
- Catherine Bedell; Joseph O. Parker; Glenn W. Sutton; Will E. Leonard Jr; Georg M. Moore; J. Banks Young (November 1971). "Certain Yarns, Fabrics, and Other Textile Products: Bibb Manufacturing Company" (PDF). U.S. International Trade Commission.
- "Bibb Mills Announce Durable New Tire Cord Which Conserves Rubber". The Butler Herald. Butler, Georgia. 7 May 1942.
- Billips, Mike (30 March 1995a). "Bibb Co. Bonds Downgraded on Expected Default". The Macon Telegraph. Macon, Georgia.
- Billips, Mike (3 April 1995b). "Blame It On Barney". The Macon Telegraph. Macon, Georgia.
- Billips, Mike (19 February 1997). "Bibb Company Sells N.C. Terry Division". The Macon Telegraph. Macon, Georgia.
- "Death of Scott Russell, Former Bib President, Lamented by Georgians". The Butler Herald. Butler, Georgia. 27 April 1950.
- Knudson, Dewey (11 July 1976). "The Bibb Company Had Historic Role In Area Economy". The Macon Telegraph. Macon, Georgia.
- Lender, John (21 May 2010). "One Foley Company Not A Success Story: Candidate For Governor". Hartford Courant. Hartford, Conn. ProQuest 257369551.
- Long, Susan (23 January 1986). "Bellevue Plant Closing; 100 Will Lose Their Jobs". The Macon Telegraph. Macon, Georgia.
- Long, Susan (9 May 1985a). "Board OKs Takeover of Textile Firm". The Macon Telegraph. Macon, Georgia.
- Long, Susan (6 December 1985b). "Executives Buy Bibb Yarn Plants". The Macon Telegraph. Macon, Georgia.
- McCurry, John W. (May 1997). "Bibb eyes growth after hard times". Textile World. p. 28.
- "Newman". West Georgia Heritage Textile Trail. Center for Public History-Department of History-University of West Georgia.
- "Company News; Dan River In $250 Million Deal To Acquire Bibb". The New York Times. Reuters. 30 June 1998.
- Rhyne, Debbie (6 December 1999). "Moving South". The Macon Telegraph. Macon, Georgia.
- "Sargent & Arnco". West Georgia Heritage Textile Trail. Center for Public History-Department of History-University of West Georgia.
- 1997 Annual Report (PDF) (Report). The Bibb Company. 1998.
- Thomas, Emory (4 January 1995). "Bibb May Suffer, But Most Parents Are Rejoicing". The Wall Street Journal. New York. ProQuest 398561280.
- Whitlock, Mary Pearl (October 1986). "1–3". Bibb Manufacturing Company and Payne City, Georgia: An Historical Perspective, 1876 – 1986 (Specialist). Georgia College.
- Williams, Arden (13 October 2006). "Bibb Manufacturing". New Georgia Encyclopedia. University of Georgia Press.
