= J. W. Comer =

American businessman (1845–1919)

John Wallace Comer
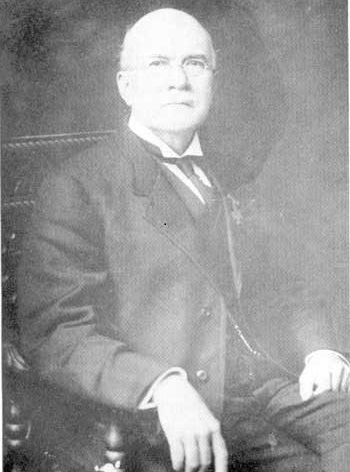
- Born: June 13, 1845; Spring Hill, Barbour County, Alabama
- Died: September 20, 1919 (aged 74); Savannah, Georgia
- Occupation: Businessman
- Spouse: Carrie Gertrude Seay
- Parent(s): Catharine Drewry Comer and John Fletcher Comer
- Relatives: B. B. Comer (brother); Hugh Comer (brother)

John Wallace Comer (13 June 1845 – 20 September 1919) was a businessman, slave owner, mine operator and planter in Alabama during the Reconstruction Era and the early 1900s. The brother of Alabama Governor B. B. Comer, John Wallace Comer operated the Comer family plantation in Barbour County, Alabama. J. W. Comer served from 1863 until 1865 in the 57th Alabama Infantry Regiment during the American Civil War. J. W. Comer also operated the Eureka Iron Works throughout the late 1800s and early 1900s.

== Biography ==
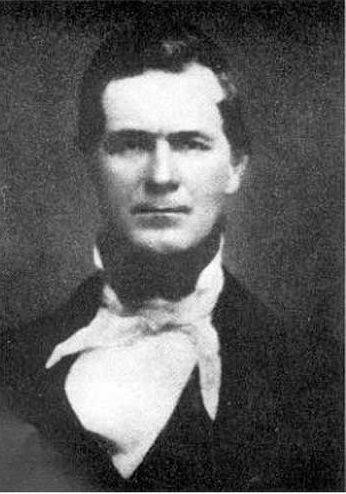
J. W. Comer's father, John Fletcher Comer

=== Early life ===
J. W. Comer was born on the Comer family's plantation in Spring Hill, Barbour County, Alabama. His father, John Fletcher Comer, died when John Wallace was 13 years old. Wallace, as he was known in his family, was educated primarily in private schools and through the use of private tutors. in 1861, when he was 16, the Civil War broke out. J. W. would enlist two years later in 1863.

=== Civil War service ===
John Wallace enlisted on 1 April 1863 in Troy, Alabama to serve in the 57th Alabama Infantry Regiment. J. W. Comer achieved the rank of 1st Sergeant and was stationed in Mobile and Pollard until 1864. Comer joined the Alabama 27th Infantry Regiment as a Lieutenant in 1864 and followed them to Demopolis where they joined with the Army of the Tennessee. Comer served under Captain B. M. Talbot in Company H of the 57th Alabama Infantry Regiment for the majority of his service.

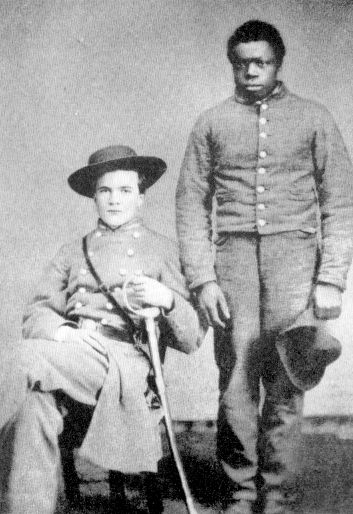
Comer in uniform with his enslaved "body servant", Burrell, c. 1864

Comer was injured during the Battle of Atlanta and was rescued from the battlefield by his body servant, Burrell. Body servants were slaves who were often brought into battle by Confederate soldiers. Burrell, who was only 16 at the time, took Comer to a bateau and rowed him down the Chattahoochee River to Columbus, Georgia, a distance of almost 260 miles. Comer's mother met them there and took Comer and Burrell to Spring Hill where Comer recuperated. Comer himself noted that Burrell was a slave and not a soldier. Following the war, Burrell received a pension from the State of Alabama.

Following his recuperation, Comer rejoined his company in North Carolina. Comer was the last officer left in his company when it surrendered to Union forces. He had been promoted to Captain shortly before the surrender, but the commission was not processed before the war ended.

=== Election riot of 1874 ===
Comer played a prominent role in the Election Riot of 1874. The White League, a paramilitary group opposed to equal rights for newly emancipated African Americans in the southern United States, attacked a polling place in Spring Hill. The son, Willie Kells, of the Republican Federal Judge presiding over the elections, Judge Elias M. Kells, was shot and killed in a melee that took place in the county courthouse. The White League was attempting to prevent any more Republican candidates from being elected into office by the majority black, Republican electorate of Barbour County.

Following their invasion of nearby Eufaula, the White League stormed the polling place in Spring Hill and destroyed the ballot box. The League effectively led a coup d'etat in Barbour County as they removed all Republican officials from public office and installed Democrats instead.

Legend holds that Comer, who was involved in the assault on the Spring Hill polling place, spared the life of Judge Kells, who, rather than his son, was the intended target of the mob, after the judge made the Masonic sign to Comer.

=== Business Interests ===
==== Agriculture ====
Comer had a stake in a multitude of agricultural and mineral interests. He owned and operated a plantation in Barbour County, known as Spring Hill. Additionally, he and his older brother, Hugh Moss Comer, established the Cowikee Mills at Eufala. Comer assisted his younger brother, Edward Trippe Comer, in the administration of his seven plantations in Milhaven, Georgia. Comer also had a stake in the firm of Comer and McCurdy which bred Hambletonian horses in Lowndesboro, Alabama. Comer also assisted in the administration of the Eureka Mines.

Comer operated the plantation at Spring Hill using leased convict labor, a practice common in southern industry at the time, throughout the late nineteenth and early twentieth centuries. The Comer Plantation leased African-American convicts from the State of Alabama. After a visit to the Comer Plantation in Barbour County in 1883, Richard Dawson, the Alabama Prison Inspector, wrote:

"Things in bad order. No fireplace in cell. No arrangements for washing. No Hospital. Everything filthy- privy terrible- convicts ragged many barefooted- very heavily ironed."

At this time, residents of Barbour County were notorious for kidnapping and selling African Americans into bondage, to exploit their labor after the war to rebuild the wealth of Alabama's elite.

The peonage scheme in the American South grew out of enforcement of the "Black Codes" passed by many southern states immediately after the American Civil War, which sought to control the movement and labor of freedmen, who were sometimes migrating to reunite families and who wanted to do sharecropping rather than work for wages. States required freedmen to work or be defined as vagrants, and sought to regulate behavior by narrowly defining what was acceptable, including prohibition of gambling. Freedmen could also be arrested for such charges as insulting behavior or rudeness to white women. By the 1880s, local and state officials manipulated the system to entrap African Americans. Local officials would arrest African Americans, use white juries to convict them of trumped-up charges, and fine them for their actions plus court costs. Most cash-strapped African Americans could not pay such fines. The state leased them as prisoners to industry and planters for the amount of the fines (usually for $50– $100). Prisoners had to work off the amount they owed to the state through forced labor on farms, plantations, mills and mines.

Although illiterate, the prisoners were forced to sign labor contracts, often including stipulations that they would be subject to the same conditions as other prisoners, which meant leg

irons, being unable to leave their place of work without being subject to punishment, and extension of labor contracts. Researchers have found that the bondsmen were charged for food and medical care; this meant that they were forced to incur debts so they would have to keep working as prisoners. Local and state officials collaborated during the 1880s and 90s, to convert black tenant farmers and sharecroppers into convict labor. Once convicted of petty crimes, these citizens were subject to imprisonment, shackles, and the lash, and worked in the same fields where a few weeks earlier they had been independent, free laborers.

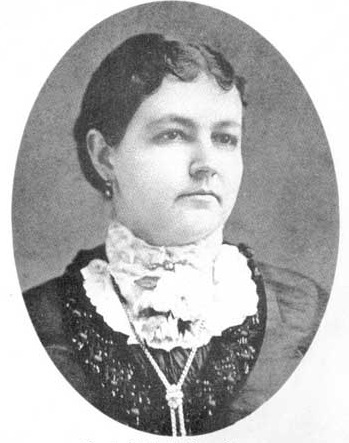
Carrie Gertrude Seay, J. W. Comer's wife

==== Eureka Mines ====
An important source of wealth for Comer was the development of the Eureka Mines. The Eureka complex consisted of two mines, one worked by free miners, and the other by convicts leased under the convict labor system. The vast majority of convict laborers were African Americans, who were convicted in the justice system at a rate of four times that of white citizens. The Eureka mines were developed by "primitive excavation techniques and relentless, atavistic physical force."

Ezekial Archey, a prisoner leased to Eureka mine, wrote that the convicts lived in a stockade "filled with filth and vermin. Gunpowder cans were used to hold human waste that would fill up and 'run all over our beds where prisoners were shackled hand and foot for the night'." Later he wrote to a Roosevelt Administration investigator that:

"[JW]Comer is a hard man. I have seen men come to him with their shirts a solid scab on their backs and he would let the hide grow on and take it off again. I have seen him hit men 100 to 160 times with a ten prong strop and then say thay [sic] was not whipped. He would go off after an escaped man come one day with him and dig his grave the same day."

Between 1878 and 1880, twenty-five bonded convicts died whose contracts had been sold to the Eureka mines. Their bodies were dumped into shallow earthen pits on the edge of the mine site. Jonathan Good testified to the Joint Commission created by the Roosevelt administration to investigate the use of peonage in Alabama enterprises. He said that J. W. Comer, manager of the Eureka mines,

ordered a captured black escapee to lie on the ground and the dogs were biting him. He begged piteously to have the dogs taken off of him, but Comer refused to allow it. Comer...stripped him naked took a stirrup strap, doubled it, wet it, bucked him and whipped him, unmercifully whipped him, over half an hour. The Negro begged them to take a gun and kill him. They left him in a Negro cabin where... he died within a few hours.

=== Political views ===
Although, unlike his brother, Governor Braxton Bragg Comer, J. W. Comer neither aspired to nor held public office, he did, both publicly and vehemently, denounce the Populist trend in Alabama politics.

== See also ==
- B. B. Comer
- Hugh Comer
