= Kommer =

Kommer is a surname. Notable people with the name include:

- Asso Kommer (born 1966), Estonian soldier and politician
- Nick Kommer (born 1990), Australian rules footballer

== See also ==
- Kommer Damen, Dutch businessman
- Fred Kommers, American baseball player
- Kummer, a surname
- Commer, British vehicle manufacturing company
