= George Odom =

George Odom may refer to:

- George David Odom, birth name of Dave Odom (born 1942), American basketball coach
- George M. Odom (1882–1964), American jockey and horse trainer
- George T. Odom (1950–2016), American actor
- George Phillips Odom Jr. (1941–2010), American artist and amateur geometer
