= D. J. Daniels =

American politician

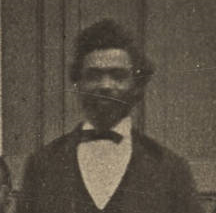
D. J. Daniels (c.1872)

D. J. Daniels was a state legislator in Alabama. He served in the Alabama Senate in 1872 representing Russell County, Alabama. He was a member of the Alabama House of Representatives in 1874 until being ousted for not being registered or having taken an oath. Daniels and Prince Gardner received more than 2,600 votes while the candidates who replaced them, W. H. Chamber and A. G. Jones, received less than 2,000.

He spoke out in protest against the resolution to defeat the Sumner Civil Right Bill for several reason including that he believed the bill to be "what I think is right and justice" and that the resolution caused the other legislators to "violate their solemn oath".

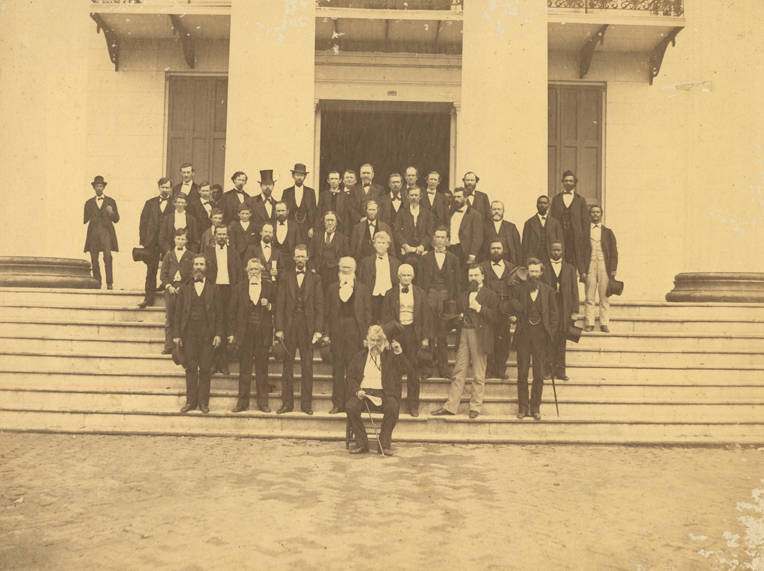
Photo of Alabama Senate members in 1872 on the capitol steps

He and other 1872 Alabama Senators were photographed on the capitol steps. The photograph is part of the Alabama Department of Archives and History.

== See also ==
- African American officeholders from the end of the Civil War until before 1900
