= B. B. Comer Memorial Library =

- B.B. Comer Memorial Library
- U.S. National Register of Historic Places
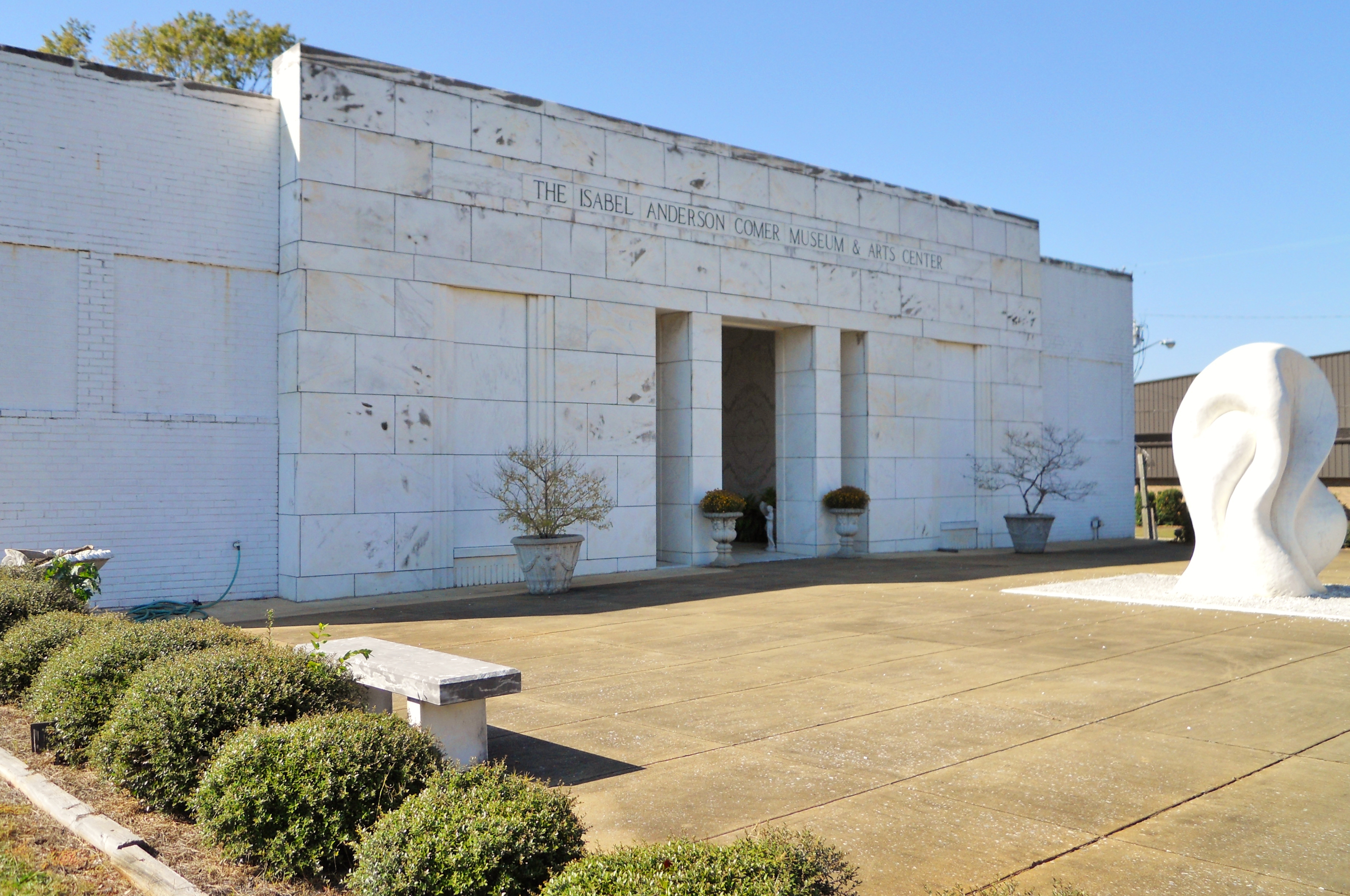
- Front entrance with sculpture

- Location within Alabama Location within the United States
- Location: 314 N. Broadway Ave., Sylacauga, Alabama
- Coordinates: 33°10′39″N 86°15′4″W
- Area: 1.1 acres (0.45 ha)
- Architectural style: Moderne
- NRHP reference No.: 05000972
- Added to NRHP: September 5, 2018

The B.B. Comer Memorial Library is a library located in Sylacauga, Alabama. The library was named to the National Register of Historic Places on September 6, 2005.

The library was founded in 1936 as the Sylacauga Public Library. It was moved three years later, and after a $5,000 grant by the family B. B. Comer, the library was renamed in his honor. The library was again renamed to Isabel Anderson Comer Museum and Arts Center in 1962. It was created with a marble exterior, and was originally built through the Works Progress Administration.
