= Historic Chattahoochee Commission =

State agency of alabama and georgia, US

The Historic Chattahoochee Commission (HCC), a state agency of both Alabama and Georgia, promotes heritage tourism, history education, and historic preservation in an eighteen county area in Alabama and Georgia marketed as the "Chattahoochee Trace." The region is centered on the lower Chattahoochee River where it forms the boundary between the states.

== History ==
Originally organized in 1970, in 1978 the Georgia General Assembly and the Alabama Legislature passed identical legislation to establish an interstate compact for the operation of the Commission. Final approval of the compact came in October of that year when the same bill cleared the U.S. Congress and President Jimmy Carter signed it into law. The organization maintains offices in Eufaula, Alabama and LaGrange, Georgia.

Alabama counties include Barbour, Chambers, Dale, Henry, Houston, Lee, and Russell; Georgia counties include Chattahoochee, Clay, Decatur, Early, Harris, Muscogee, Quitman, Randolph, Seminole, Stewart, and Troup.

Presently the Commission is funded by both Alabama and Georgia. The HCC is the only tourism/preservation agency in the nation with official authority to cross state lines to pursue goals common to all counties involved.

== Events ==
The HCC's numerous programs and projects educate residents and visitors about the unique cultural and natural heritage of the Chattahoochee Trace region and stimulate economic development through tourism. Activities include:

- Grants – providing financial support to a range of innovative public history, education, publishing, tourism, and preservation projects
- Scholarship, Publication and Education – the HCC has published over 30 books on regional history, has sponsored folklife and agritourism research projects, and produced a Heritage Education Unit for use in local schools
- Historical Markers and Historic Site Interpretation – the HCC has erected over 300 historical markers commemorating important people, places, and events in regional history, and guided the creation of the renowned Chattahoochee Indian Heritage Center. It also operates the Hart House, a ca. 1850 home that serves as its Alabama office, as a house museum.
- Heritage Tourism Advocacy – the HCC annually distributes thousands of brochures throughout the Southeast and nation promoting the attractions of the Chattahoochee Trace region of Georgia and Alabama, publishes a monthly calendar of events, and has sponsored familiarization tours for travel writers to bring national attention to the area
- Community Service – the HCC is a partner in several praiseworthy charitable and community development initiatives

== Dissolution ==
The HCC ceased to exist in 2018. After failure to receive annual appropriations from the State of Alabama for eight fiscal years, the HCC’s board of directors voted to dissolve the organization.
