= Wolfgang Kummer =

Wolfgang Kummer can refer to:

- Wolfgang Kummer (bobsledder) (1914-1988), German bobsledder
- Wolfgang Kummer (ice hockey) (born 1970), German ice hockey player
