= George Phillips Odom Jr. =

American artist (1941–2010)

George Phillips Odom Jr. (1941 – 18 December 2010) was an American artist and amateur geometer who is primarily known for his work on the golden ratio ($\Phi$).

== Life and work ==
problem E3007 (Odom, 1983) $\tfrac{|AB|}{|BC|}=\tfrac{|AC|}{|AB|}=\Phi$

Odom garnered some recognition early in his career for his light machines made from fibre optics, that he exhibited at the Knoll International Gallery in Manhattan in the 1960s. Later his career faltered somewhat and he could not repeat his early success. Odom suffered from depressions which ultimately culminated in a suicide attempt and a subsequent hospitalization at the Hudson River Psychiatric Center in Poughkeepsie, where he became a permanent resident starting in the early 1980s.

Odom became interested in geometry after visiting an exhibition by Buckminster Fuller in the 1960s. In the mid 1970s he contacted the Canadian geometer Harold Coxeter as he felt his art work was of some mathematical interest as well. This led to a longtime correspondence with Coxeter and another mathematician Magnus Wenninger, a monk from Minnesota, that spanned over several decades. The two mathematicians were among Odom's few regular contacts with the outside world after he had moved to the Hudson River Psychiatric Center, where he led a rather isolated life. Their correspondence was not only about mathematical topics, but also comprised matters of philosophy, psychology, religion and world affairs. In mathematics Odom was particularly interested in various geometric shapes and the golden ratio. He discovered the occurrence of the golden ratio in a few elementary geometrical figures, where it had not been noticed before. The two mathematicians communicated Odom's results to others in their lectures and conversations, and Coxeter incorporated them into some of his publications as well. Best known of these is the construction of the golden ratio with the help of an equilateral triangle and its circumcircle. Coxeter posed Odom's construction in the form of a problem, that was published 1983 in the American Mathematical Monthly as problem #E3007:

Let A and B be midpoints of the sides EF and ED of an equilateral triangle DEF. Extend AB to meet the circumcircle (of DEF) at C. Show that B divides AC according to the golden section

$\tfrac{|AE|}{|AF|}=\tfrac{|EF|}{|AE|}=\Phi$

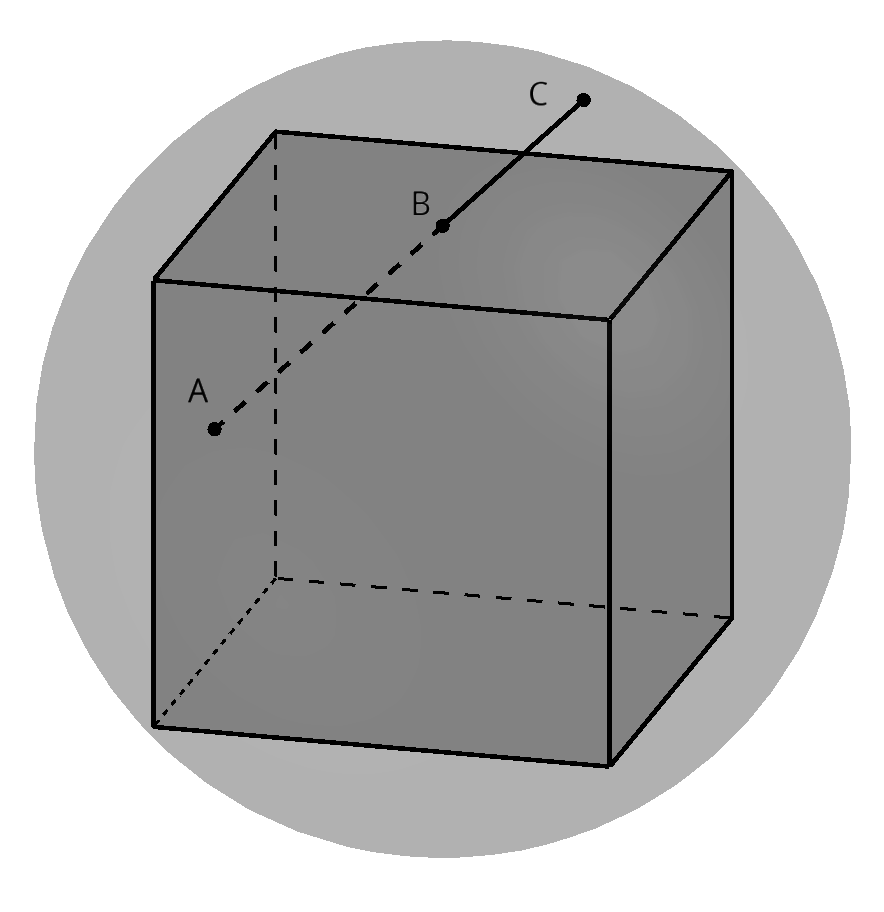
$\tfrac{|AC|}{|AB|}=\tfrac{|AB|}{|BC|}=\Phi$

Odom also found another construction of the golden ratio, that is based on an equilateral triangle:

Consider an equilateral triangle ABC with its altitude from C onto AB. Let D be the pedal point of the altitude on AB. Now extend the altitude CD beyond D by |BD| and denote the endpoint of the extension with E. The ray EA intersects the circle around D with radius |CD| in F and A divides now EF according to the golden section.

Odom used 3-dimensional geometrical shapes in his artwork, which he examined for occurrences of the golden ratio as well. There he discovered two simple occurrences in platonic solids and their circumscribed spheres.

The first occurrence requires connecting the midpoints A and B of 2 edges of a tetrahedron surface and extending this line on one side so that it intersects the circumscribed sphere at C; then B divides AC according to the golden section. This construction also yields the situation of problem #E3007 from above, if one cuts this 3-dimensional figure along the plane in which the tetrahedron surface is embedded.

The second occurrence is in a cube. If one connects the centers A and B of any two cube adjacent faces and extends the connecting line segment again, such that the extended line intersects the circumscribed sphere at C, then B will divide AC according to the golden section.

The Princeton mathematician John Horton Conway visited Odom in Poughkeepsie in 2007.
