= John Odom =

John Odom may refer to:

- Blue Moon Odom (born 1945 as Johnny Lee Odom), American baseball player
- John Odom (baseball) (1982–2008), American baseball player
