= USS Odum =

American WWII high-speed transport

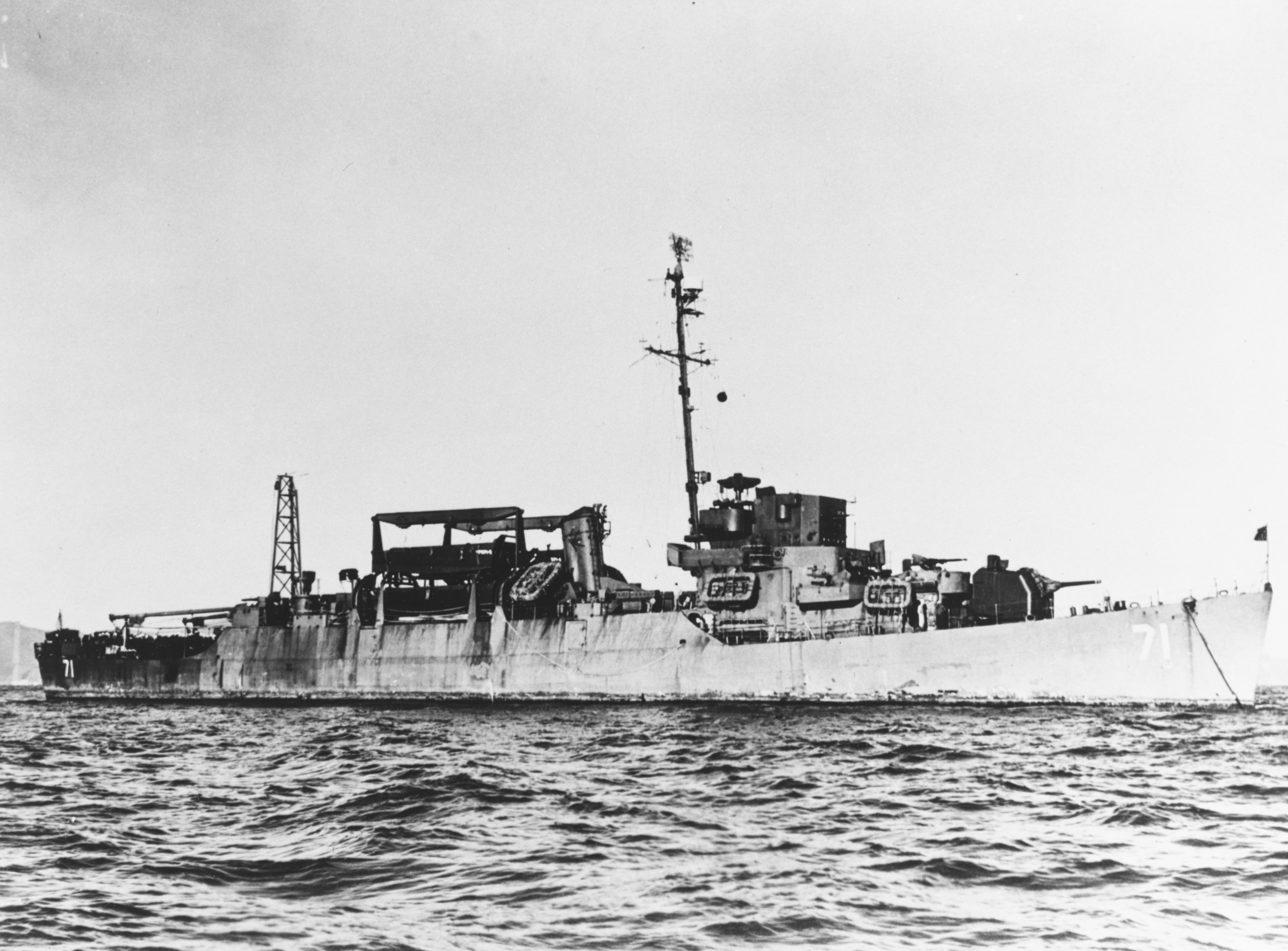
- USS Odum

History

United States
- Name: USS Odum
- Namesake: Fireman First Class Joseph R. Odum (1913–1942), U.S. Navy Silver Star recipient
- Builder: Consolidated Steel Corporation, Orange, Texas
- Laid down: 15 October 1943
- Launched: 19 January 1944
- Sponsored by: Mrs. Katherine Odum
- Reclassified: APD-71, 27 June 1944
- Commissioned: 12 January 1945
- Decommissioned: 15 November 1946
- Stricken: 1 November 1966 or 1 December 1966
- Fate: Transferred to Chile

History

Chile
- Name: Serrano (APD-26)
- Acquired: 15 November 1966
- Stricken: 1984
- Fate: Scrapped

General characteristics
- Class & type: Charles Lawrence-class high-speed transport
- Displacement: 1,400 long tons (1,422 t)
- Length: 306 ft (93 m) overall
- Beam: 36 ft 10 in (11.23 m)
- Draft: 13 ft 6 in (4.11 m) maximum
- Installed power: 12,000 shaft horsepower (16 megawatts)
- Propulsion: Two boilers; two GE steam turbines (turbo-electric transmission)
- Speed: 24 knots (44 km/h; 28 mph)
- Range: 6,000 nautical miles (11,000 km) at 12 knots (22 km/h; 14 mph)
- Troops: 162
- Complement: 186
- Armament: 1 × 5 in (130 mm) gun; 6 × 40 mm guns; 6 × 20 mm guns; 2 × depth charge tracks

USS Odum (APD-71), ex-DE-670, was a United States Navy high-speed transport in commission from 1945 to 1946.

The ship was named after Joseph Roy Odum, who was killed in action aboard the destroyer USS Meredith in October 1942.

== Construction and commissioning ==
Odum was laid down as the Buckley-class destroyer escort USS Odum (DE-670) by the Consolidated Steel Corporation at Orange, Texas, on 15 October 1943 and launched as such on 19 January 1944, sponsored by Mrs. Katherine Odum, mother of the ship's namesake. The ship was reclassified as a Charles Lawrence-class high-speed transport and redesignated APD-71 on 27 June 1944. After conversion to her new role, the ship was commissioned on 12 January 1945.

== Service history ==
=== World War II ===
Following shakedown off Bermuda, Odum transited the Panama Canal and proceeded up the Pacific coast to San Diego, California, whence she departed on 16 May 1945 for Hawaii. There she completed amphibious warfare training off Maui, took on underwater demolition team gear, and headed to the Western Pacific for World War II service. Discharging her cargo at Guam, she proceeded to Ulithi Atoll, whence she escorted transport SS Kote Baroe to Leyte in the Philippine Islands, arriving there on 29 June 1945. From Leyte, escort missions took her again to Ulithi Atoll, thence to Hollandia in New Guinea, and back to Leyte.

=== Postwar ===
At Leyte, in mid-August, following the surrender of Japan on 15 August 1945, Odum joined Task Force 33 and, on 31 August 1945, got underway to escort transports carrying troops for the occupation of Japan. Arriving in Japan on 8 September 1945, she departed again on 12 September 1945 to escort transports carrying Allied former prisoners of war to the Philippines.

Odum remained in the Far East supporting the occupation of Japan until late November 1945, when she headed back to the United States. Assigned to the United States Atlantic Fleet, she operated in Transport Squadron 2 along the United States East Coast and off Cuba and Puerto Rico until entering the Charleston Naval Shipyard at Charleston, South Carolina, for inactivation on 26 July 1946, after which she proceeded to Green Cove Springs, Florida for decommissioning.

== Decommissioning and disposal ==
Odum decommissioned at Green Cove Springs on 15 November 1946 and entered the Florida Group of the Atlantic Reserve Fleet on the St. Johns River there. Later transferred to the Texas Group of the Atlantic Reserve Fleet, Odum remained inactive in reserve for 20 years until stricken from the Navy List on either 1 November 1966 or 1 December 1966.

== Chilean Navy service ==
Odum was sold to Chile on 15 November 1966 under the Military Assistance Program. During the dictatorship of Pinochet, the Serrano was used for the transport of political prisoners to Dawson Island. She served in the Chilean Navy as Serrano (APD-26) until retired in 1984 and scrapped.
