= Karl Kummer =

Karl Kummer may refer to:

- Karl Kummer (boxer) (1909 – ? ), Swiss boxer
- Karl Kummer (politician) (1904–1967), Austrian politician, social reformer, and labour law reformer
