= Vernon Odom =

American journalist (born 1948)

Vernon Odom, Jr. (born September 16, 1948) is a retired local Philadelphia TV journalist.

== Early life and education ==
Odom is the son of Vernon Odom Sr. and Sadie Harvey Odom. His sister, Maida Cassandra Odom, is also a journalist and a professor at Temple University, Philadelphia.

Odom received a Bachelor of Arts degree in sociology and political science from Morehouse College and later continued his education at Columbia University.

== Career ==
He started with WPVI-TV, in Philadelphia on May 17, 1976. He has covered a plethora of major stories during his tenure, ranging from Presidential debates to the 1985 MOVE bombing. He also hosted Visions, a weekly look at urban life in Philadelphia. In November 2004, he was inducted into the Broadcast Pioneers Hall of Fame.

He retired from 6 ABC in December of 2019, and now works as a visiting professor at West Chester University in West Chester, Pennsylvania.
