= Mel Odom =

Mel Odom may refer to:

- Mel Odom (artist) (born 1950), American artist, illustrator and doll designer
- Mel Odom (writer) (born 1957), American writer
