= Christopher C. Odom =

American film director

Christopher C. Odom (born July 7, 1970 in Manhasset, New York), is an independent director, producer, writer, cinematographer, editor, composer and actor.

Odom holds a Bachelor of Arts in Film and Video with a Minor in Theater from Georgia State University in Atlanta, Georgia and a Professional Certificate in Screenwriting, as well as a Master of Fine Arts in Film, Television and Digital Video, from the University of California, Los Angeles.

== Biography ==
In 2003, Odom completed the feature documentary How To Make It In Hollywood Before You Make, on which Chris worked as the producer, director, writer and editor.

Currently, Odom is writing, directing, and producing a slate of Hi-Def low-budget Faith-based features.

== Influences ==
Odom's father, an avid movie buff, first laid down Odom's interest in movies. Odom also cites films with African American actors, as well as Spike Lee, Steven Spielberg, Akira Kurosawa, George Lucas, Orson Welles and Peter Greenaway as his influences.

== Selected works ==
- The 23rd Psalm, Feature, Director/Writer/Cinematographer/Editor/Producer, In\-Post Production
- How To Make It In Hollywood Before You Make It, Documentary, Director/Writer/Cinematographer/Editor/Producer, Tapeworm Video Distributors
- Angel of Hate, Feature, Cinematographer, by Michael Marks
