= Spring Hill, Barbour County, Alabama =

Unincorporated community in Alabama, United States

Spring Hill, Alabama
- Unincorporated community
- Location within Alabama Location within the United States
- Coordinates: 32°04′46″N 85°20′13″W
- Country: United States
- State: Alabama
- County: Barbour
- Elevation: 374 ft (114 m)
- Time zone: UTC-6 (Central (CST))
  - Summer (DST): UTC-5 (CDT)
- Area code: 334
- GNIS feature ID: 155254

Spring Hill is an unincorporated community in Barbour County, Alabama, United States. Spring Hill is located at the junction of County Routes 49 and 89, 17.2 miles (27.7 km) northwest of Eufaula.

Spring Hill Methodist Church is listed on the National Register of Historic Places.

Spring Hill is the birthplace of B. B. Comer, Hugh Comer and J. W. Comer.
