= Elijah B. Odom =

US-American physician

- Born: Elijah Byrd Odom; 10 October 1859; Hernando, Mississippi, United States of America
- Died: 24 February 1924 (aged 64); Biscoe, Arkansas, United States of America
- Education: LeMoyne Normal Institute; Meharry Medical College
- Occupations: Physician and businessperson
- Spouse: Ada Georgia Odom (née Toone)
- Children: 8
- Parents: Sandy Odom (father); Gatsey Odom (mother)

Elijah B. Odom (10 October 1859 – 24 February 1924) was an American physician and businessperson from Hernando, Mississippi. He was born into slavery in 1859. Despite the enactment of the Emancipation Proclamation in 1863, his descendants believe he was still kept a slave as a child, forced to pick berries by his owner. Elijah and his brothers eventually escaped to freedom, swimming across a narrow part of the Mississippi River. He attended LeMoyne Normal Institute in Memphis, Tennessee and graduated valedictorian in 1882. He later attended Meharry Medical College in Nashville, Tennessee, and became the only black doctor in Biscoe, Arkansas in 1899. He also owned a store and a pharmacy there.

Elijah had 8 children, including Ruth Bonner, who on September 24, 2016, at the age of 99, joined President Barack Obama and four generations of her own family, including her 7-year-old great-granddaughter Christine, in ringing a bell dating back to the 1880s from First Baptist Church in Williamsburg, Virginia, to dedicate the opening of the National Museum of African American History and Culture on the National Mall in Washington, DC.

Elijah was also the father of Vernon L. Odom, the youngest of his children. Vernon was born in 1921 in Biscoe, Arkansas, and attended Morehouse College with Dr. Martin Luther King Jr. He retired from his job as executive director of the Urban League in 1992. He received the Bert Polsky Humanitarian Award from the Akron Community Foundation. He died at the age of 74 on May 22, 1996.
