= Vernon Odom Sr. =

American civil rights leader (1921–1996)

Vernon L. Odom, Sr.
- Born: Vernon Lane Odom; 9 June 1921; Biscoe, Arkansas, United States of America
- Died: 22 May 1996 (aged 74); Akron, Ohio, United States of America
- Education: Morehouse College; Clark Atlanta University
- Occupation: civil rights leader
- Spouse: Sadie Harvey Odom
- Children: Maida Odom; Vernon Odom

Vernon Lane Odom, Sr. (9 June 1921 – 22 May 1996) was an American civil rights leader. He was born in Biscoe, Arkansas to Dr. Elijah and Ada Odom. His father was born into slavery in 1859 and later became a physician, his mother was a teacher and raised the children on her own after Elijah Odom's death in 1924. In 1949, Odom graduated from Morehouse College in Atlanta, Georgia. Thereafter he earned a master's degree in social work from Clark Atlanta University.

Odom was recognized for his 43 years of work for civil rights causes in Akron, Ohio, as well as his positions as the executive director of the Akron Community Service Center and the Akron chapter of the Urban League. Today, he is remembered by the Vern Odom Allotment, a suburban-style housing development located off Vernon Odom Boulevard. Vernon Odom Boulevard, formerly Wooster Avenue (a main thoroughfare through one of Akron's predominantly African-American neighborhoods), was renamed in his honor in 2002. After this was passed, many local signs were renamed to read "V Odom Boulevard", reaping much public conversation and amusement.

From Bob Dyer's column "Dyer Streets" in the Akron Beacon Journal:

"Victory for Vern"

We have lost our Vodom. Unlike losing your mojo, losing your Vodom is a good thing. For those of you just joining us, Akron City Council voted in 2002 to rename Wooster Avenue to honor a legendary local civil rights leader named Vernon Odom. But the bill's sponsor, Marco Sommerville — operating on the assumption that everyone who worked for the city was familiar with the man — scrawled out a quick Post-It Note to the street department requesting signs for the new V Odom Boulevard. The street department took him literally and created V Odom street signs, then passed along his request, verbatim, to the Ohio Department of Transportation, which is responsible for the big signs on the interstates. Thus, we were Vodomized. The word Vodom entered the local lexicon, turning the honor into a joke. Fortunately, Odom's first name wasn't Sam, Stu or Stan. But still — this certainly wasn't what his friends and colleagues had in mind. Now, finally, freeway drivers have been fully introduced to Vernon Odom. Unfortunately, a few signs here and there have retained their Vodomism — including one marking the boulevard's exit off of another boulevard named for one of Odom's college classmates — Martin Luther King Jr. But perhaps in another six years we can fix those, too.

— Bob Dyer, Dyer Streets, Akron Beacon Journal

Odom was married to Sadie Harvey Odom. They had two children, Philadelphia journalist Vernon Odom and Maida C. Odom, who is a professor for journalism at Temple University, Philadelphia.
