= Susan Odom =

American chemical engineer (1980–2021)

Susan A. Odom
- Education: University of Kentucky; Georgia Institute of Technology
- Known for: Energy materials
- Scientific career
- Workplaces: University of Illinois at Urbana-Champaign; University of Kentucky
- Doctoral advisor: Seth Marder

Susan A. Odom (November 16, 1980 – April 18, 2021) was a Professor of Chemistry at the University of Kentucky who developed redox active organic compounds for energy storage applications.

== Early life and education ==
Odom was inspired to explore STEM fields by her father who was a metallurgical engineer. She studied chemistry at the University of Kentucky and graduated in 2003, working under the supervision of Geoffrey Coates at Cornell University (a summer NSF REU) and John Anthony at the University of Kentucky. She moved to Georgia Institute of Technology where she conducted graduate research under the supervision of Seth R. Marder. After graduating in 2008, she moved to the University of Illinois as a postdoctoral scholar under Jeffrey S Moore. In 2011, she joined the faculty of the University of Kentucky.

== Research and career ==
Odom joined the faculty at the University of Kentucky in 2011 and was promoted to Associate Professor in 2017. She developed new materials for energy storage applications, including redox shuttles for overcharge protection and electrolytes for redox flow batteries. She aspired to develop stable, soluble redox-active organic materials.

Lithium-ion batteries in series are at risk of being overcharged. If one cell is weaker – or has lower capacity than other cells in the series – the series cannot achieve 100% state of charge without overcharging the weaker battery. One way to mitigate overcharge is to incorporate internal shunts called redox shuttles into the battery electrolyte. The redox shuttle is oxidized at the cathode/electrolyte interface to form a radical cation, then is reduced at the anode/electrolyte interface to return to its neutral form. For every redox shuttle cycle, an electron is transported from the cathode to the anode. An effective redox shuttle will limit cell potential to its oxidation potential. Odom developed one of the most effective redox shuttles to date, mitigating charging currents as high as 1 C, which is defined as one charge/discharge cycle per hour.

Challenges with using lithium-ion batteries for grid storage include the potential for catastrophic failure on a large scale as well as sourcing lithium and transition metals for cathode materials. Odom demonstrated promising results in the liquid-based electrochemical energy storage system called redox flow batteries. If capacities and cell voltages are sufficiently high, and if costs can be sufficiently low, these batteries will penetrate the market for grid-scale storage. Already installations exist throughout the world with aqueous vanadium-based electrolytes, but widespread adoption is limited due to economic viability. In 2016, Odom and Fikile Brushett demonstrated the performance of a phenothiazine derivative in a symmetric flow cell battery. This material was patented and licensed to Tokyo Chemicals Incorporated. The pair later demonstrated the viability of two-electron donating materials for the positive side of a redox flow battery.

In collaboration with chemist Chad Risko, Odom studied how strain alters the oxidation and reduction potentials of materials through the prevention of electronic relaxation. In one case, a material was developed as a shelf-stable commercial oxidant. She showed that substituents that induce strain raise oxidation potentials regardless of their Hammet coefficient.

=== Awards and honours ===
- 2004 National Science Foundation Graduate Research Fellowship
- 2009 National Science Foundation American Competitiveness in Chemistry Postdoctoral Fellowship
- 2011 American Chemical Society Petroleum Research Fund Doctoral New Investigator Award
- 2012, 2013, 2016, 2017 University of Kentucky Teacher Who Made a Difference Award
- 2014 Chemical Communications Emerging Investigator
- 2015 University of Kentucky College of Arts & Sciences Diversity in Research Award
- 2017 University of Kentucky College of Arts & Sciences Outstanding Research Mentor Award
- 2017 University of Kentucky Society for the Promotion of Undergraduate Research Outstanding Faculty Mentor Award
- 2017, 2018, 2019 Research Corporation for Scientific Advancement Scialog Fellow for Advanced Energy Storage
- 2020 American Chemical Society Women Chemists Committee Rising Star Award

Odom served on the organizing committee for multiple symposia in the Materials Research Society. In 2020, Odom was elected as a Member at Large in the Battery Division of the Electrochemical Society. Odom served on the editorial board of Materials Today.

=== Publications ===
- S.A. Odom, K. Lancaster, L. Beverina, K.M. Lefler, N.J. Thompson, V. Coropceanu, J.-L. Brédas, S.R. Marder, & S. Barlow. "Bis(di-4-alkoxyphenyl)amino Derivatives of Dithienylethene, Bithiophene, Dithienothiophene, and Dithienopyrrole: Palladium-catalysed Synthesis and Highly Delocalised Racial Cations". Chemistry - A European Journal (2007) 13, 9637–9646. DOI: 10.1002/chem.200700668
- S.A. Odom, S. Chayanupatkul, B.J. Blaiszik, O. Zhao, A.C. Jackson, P.V. Braun, N.R. Sottos, S.R. White, & J.S. Moore. "A Self-Healing Conductive Ink". Advanced Materials (2012) 24, 2578–2581. DOI: 10.1002/adma201200196
- S.A. Odom, T.T. Tyler, M.M. Caruso, J. Ritchey, M.V. Schulmerich, S.J. Robinson, R. Bhargava, N.R. Sottos, S.R. White, M.C. Hersam, & J.S. Moore. "Autonomic Restoration of Electrical Conductivity using Polymer-Stabilized Carbon Nanotube and Graphene Microcapsules". Applied Physics Letters (2012) 101, 043106-1–043106-5. DOI: 10.1063/1.4737935
- A.P. Kaur, C.F. Elliott, S. Ergun, & S.A. Odom. "Overcharge Performance of 3,7-Bis(trifluoromethyl)-N-ethylphenothiazine at High Concentrations in Lithium-Ion Batteries". Journal of the Electrochemical Society (2016) 163, A1–A7. DOI: 10.1149/2.0951514jes
- M.D. Casselman, C.F. Elliott, S. Modekrutti, P. Zhang, S.R. Parkin, C. Risko, & S.A. Odom. "Beyond the Hammett Effect: Using Strain to Alter the Landscape of Electrochemical Potentials". ChemPhysChem (2017) 18, 2142–2146. DOI: 10.1002/cphc.201700607
- J.D. Milshtein, A.P. Kaur, M.D. Casselman, J.A. Kowalski, S. Modekrutti, P. Zhang, N.H. Attanayake, C.F. Elliott, S.R. Parkin, C. Risko, F.R. Brushett, & S.A. Odom. "High-Current-Density, Long-Duration Cycling of Soluble Organic Active Species for Non-Aqueous Redox Flow Batteries". Energy and Environmental Science (2016) 9, 3531–3543. DOI: 10.1039/C6EE02027E

== Personal life ==
Odom lived in Lexington, Kentucky. In high school and from 2006 to 2009, she bred and showed Maine Coon cats through the cattery Verismocat, which is known for its regional- and national-award-winning cats such as GC, BW, NW Verismo Wotan-of-Valhalla. Odom died after falling in her home on April 18, 2021.
