= Adam Gachet =

Alabama politician

Adam Gachet, sometimes written Adam Gashet, was a Baptist minister and state legislator in Alabama. He represented Barbour County, Alabama. He was enslaved until 1865. He is commemorated on a historical marker listing state legislators in Alabama who were African American and served during the Reconstruction era.

== See also ==
- African American officeholders from the end of the Civil War until before 1900
- Election Riot of 1874
