= Hugh Comer =

American businessman

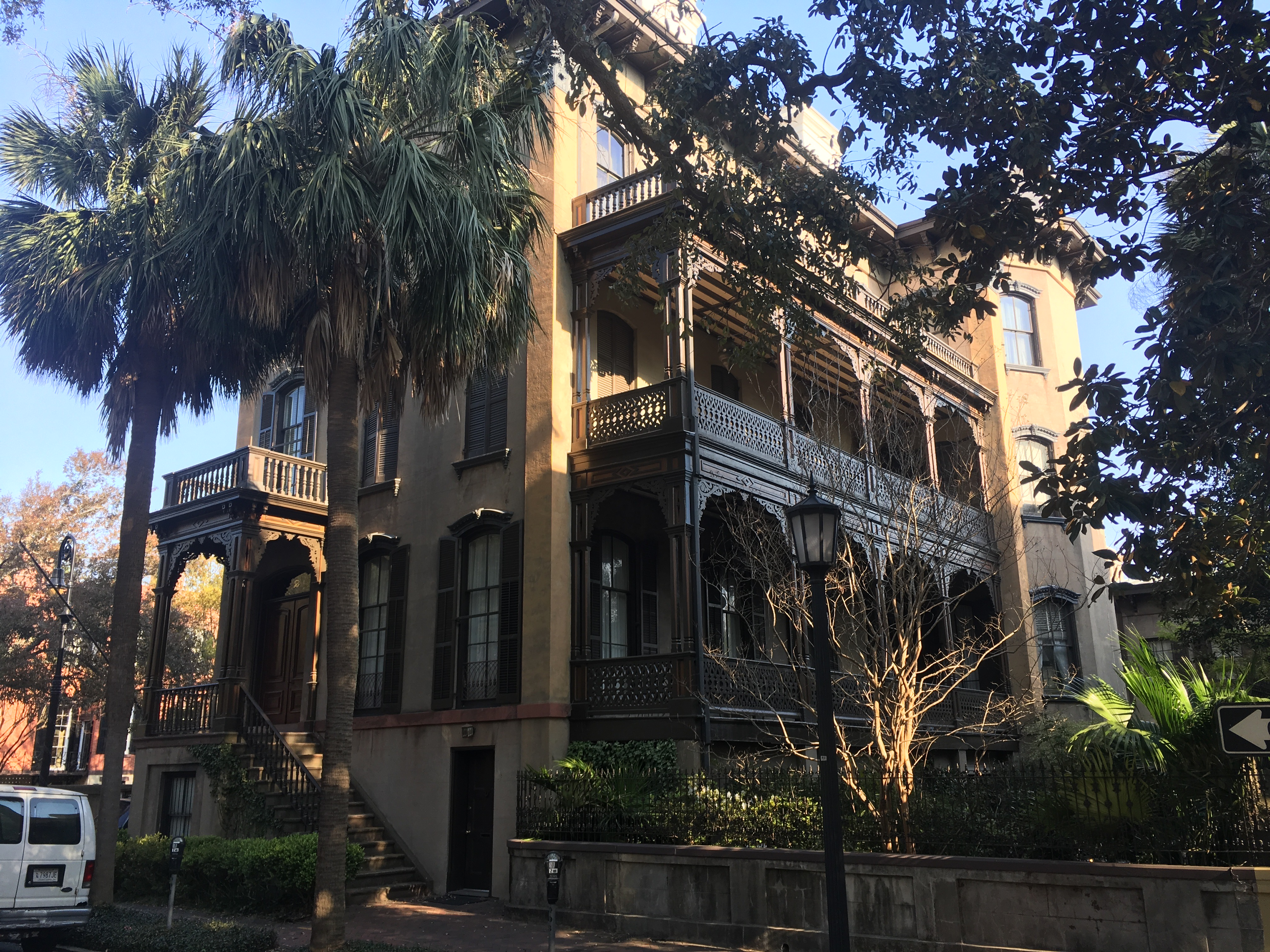
- The Comer House in Savannah, Georgia
- Born: Hugh Moss Comer; 1842; Spring Hill, Alabama, U.S.
- Died: February 26, 1900 (aged 58); Savannah, Georgia, U.S.
- Occupation: Businessman
- Known for: Presidency of the Central of Georgia Railway
- Spouse(s): Mary E. Bates (m. circa 1868–1875; her death); Lilla Hall (m. circa 1800–1900; his death)
- Relatives: B. B. Comer (brother); J. W. Comer (brother)

Hugh Moss Comer (1842 – February 26, 1900) was an American businessman. He was a president of the Central of Georgia Railway and co-founder of Bibb Manufacturing Company, in addition to having several directorships and self-owned companies.

One of his former residences, located at 2 East Taylor Street, in Monterey Square in Savannah, Georgia, is known as the Comer House today. It was built in 1880. Jefferson Davis, president of the Confederacy, was a guest at the house in 1886.

== Early life ==
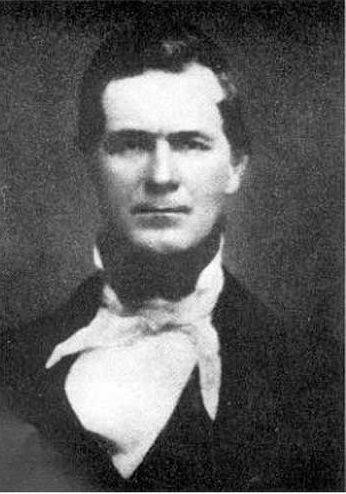
Comer's father, John Fletcher Comer

Comer was born in 1842 to John Fletcher Comer (1811–1858) and Catharine Lucinda Drewry (d. 1898). He had five brothers: John Wallace Comer (1845–1919), St. George Legare Comer (1847–1870), U.S. senator and Alabama governor Braxton Bragg Comer (1848–1919), John Fletcher Comer, Jr. (1854–1927) and Edward Trippe Comer (1856–1927). There was also at least one daughter in the family.

Comer's father was a cotton planter who also owned a lumberyard and a corn mill. He married Catharine Drewry in 1841, but left her a widow with six children when he died in 1858. She was assisted by Laura Beech Comer (1817–1900).

== Career ==
In addition to his presidency of the Central of Georgia Railway, Comer co-founded Bibb Manufacturing Company in Macon, Georgia, was a director of Banking Company of Georgia and president of Savannah Cotton Exchange and Ocean Steamship Company. He was also partner in the fertilizer firm Comer, Hull & Co.

== Personal life ==
Comer married Mary E. Bates in or before 1868, the year they moved to Savannah, Georgia, where he quickly became a prominent businessman. One of their children was Annie Comer, who married Clark Howell five months after her father's death. They also had a son, Hugh M. Comer, Jr.

Mary died in 1875, a couple of weeks after their five-month-old second daughter, Mary Emma, died, and Comer married Lilla Hall, a Connecticut native, around 1880. They had three children: John, Mary and Lilla. Daughter Lilla married Dr. John Kirk Train, a Savannah physician, in 1909.

In 1896, Comer purchased Old Town Plantation from Atlanta businessman James L. Dickey. Comer passed the property to his son, Hugh.

== Death ==
Comer died on February 26, 1900, aged 58, after a long illness. After a funeral service at Savannah's St. John's Episcopal Church, he was interred in Savannah's Bonaventure Cemetery.
