= Franz Commer =

German church musician and musicologist

Franz Aloys Theodor Commer (23 January 1813 in Cologne – 17 August 1887 in Berlin) was a German church musician and music researcher.

== Compositions ==
- Choir for The Frogs by Aristophanes 1842
- Preußens Fest-Herolde. Eine Cantate zum 15ten Oktober 1844, for male choirs and orchestra
- Der Zauberring, after a poem by Anton Wilhelm von Zuccalmaglio, for male choirs and orchestra, 1844
