= Allen E. Williams =

American politician

Allen E. Williams was a state legislator in Alabama. He represented Barbour County, Alabama in the Alabama House of Representatives between 1872 and 1874.

He was unseated, along with several other African American legislators, following the Election Massacre of 1874 in Barbour County. Williams testified that he, along with other Republican Representatives, was unseated by Democrats. He also testified about a man imprisoned for marrying a white woman and of threats that caused Williams to leave the area.

== See also ==
- Election Riot of 1874
- African American officeholders from the end of the Civil War until before 1900
