= B. B. Comer =

American politician (1848–1927)

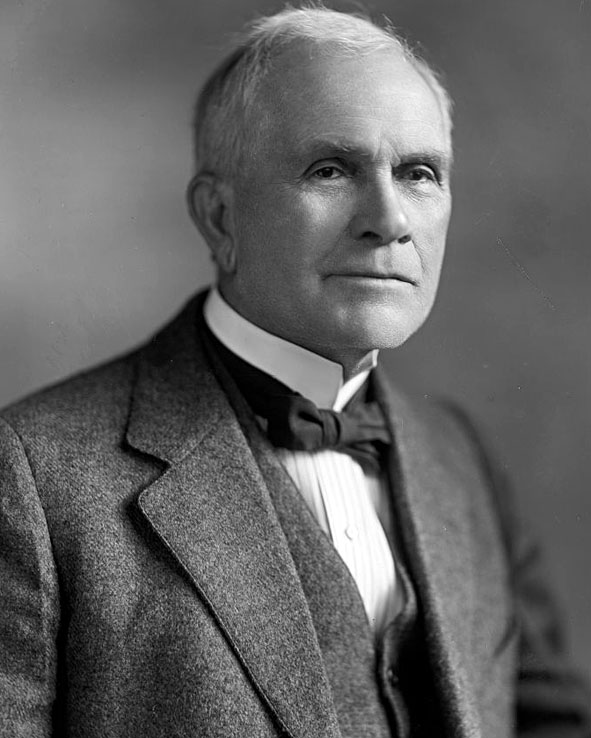
- Official portrait, 1920

United States Senator from Alabama
- In office March 5, 1920 – November 2, 1920
- Appointed by: Thomas Kilby
- Preceded by: John H. Bankhead
- Succeeded by: J. Thomas Heflin

33rd Governor of Alabama
- In office January 14, 1907 – January 17, 1911
- Lieutenant: Henry B. Gray
- Preceded by: William D. Jelks
- Succeeded by: Emmet O'Neal

Personal details
- Born: Braxton Bragg Comer; November 7, 1848 Spring Hill, Alabama, U.S.
- Died: August 15, 1927 (aged 78) Birmingham, Alabama, U.S.
- Resting place: Elmwood Cemetery (Birmingham, Alabama)
- Party: Democratic
- Spouse(s): Eva Jane Harris (m. 1872); Mary Carr Gibson (m. 1924)
- Children: Sally Bailey Comer; John Fletcher Comer; James McDonald Comer; Eva Mignon Comer; Catherine Comer; Braxton Bevelle Comer; Eva Comer; Braxton Bragg Comer Jr. Hugh M. Comer
- Relatives: Hugh Comer (brother); J. W. Comer (brother)
- Education: University of Alabama; University of Georgia; Emory and Henry College

Braxton Bragg Comer (November 7, 1848 – August 15, 1927) was an American politician who served as the 33rd governor of Alabama from 1907 to 1911, and a United States senator in 1920. As governor, Comer presided over several reforms such as railroad regulation and the lowering of business rates in Alabama to make them more competitive with other states. He also increased funding for the public school system, resulting in more rural schools and high schools in each county for white students and a rise in the state's literacy rate.

Comer was a planter and businessman before and after entering politics as a Democrat. He inherited the Comer family 30,000-acre (120 km^{2}) plantation, which was devoted to corn and cotton production. He had an interest in the Comer mines near Birmingham known as the Eureka Mines. In 1897 he invested $10,000 with the Trainer family, who intended to develop textile mills in the state, and he was appointed president of Avondale Mills, which he developed in Birmingham, serving in that role until he died in 1927.

== Early life and education ==
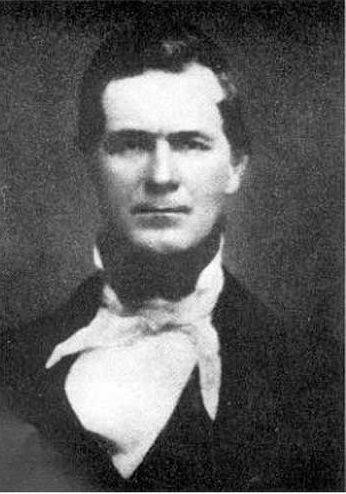
Comer's father, John Fletcher Comer

Comer was born on November 7, 1848, in Spring Hill, Alabama. He was the fourth son of John Fletcher and Catharine (Drewry) Comer. As planters, Comer's parents had built their wealth based on enslaved labor for their cotton plantation. B. B. Comer began his education at the age of ten under the tutelage of E. N. Brown.

In 1864 Comer went to the University of Alabama, but in April 1865, was forced to leave when General John T. Croxton's troops burned the university. He enrolled at the University of Georgia in Athens, where he joined the Phi Kappa Literary Society. He transferred to Emory and Henry College in Virginia, where he graduated in 1869 with AB and AM degrees.

== Marriage and family ==
In 1872, Comer married Eva Jane Harris of Cuthbert, Georgia. He built a large house for them at Comer Station, Barbour County. Eva Jane Harris Comer died on March 6, 1920, the day after her husband was appointed to the U.S. Senate by Governor Thomas Kilby. He married Mary Carr Gibson at Verbena, Alabama in 1924.

== Early business career ==
Following graduation, Comer returned to Spring Hill and helped to manage the family plantation. He primarily grew corn and cotton on what became a 30,000-acre (120 km^{2}) plantation. He continued to operate his Barbour County plantation, with his brother John managing it, after he moved his family to Anniston in east central Alabama in 1885. Comer's brother, J.W. Comer, operated the family's plantation in Barbour County. An important source of wealth for John Comer, B. B. Comer's brother, was the development of the Eureka Mines.

== Avondale Mills ==
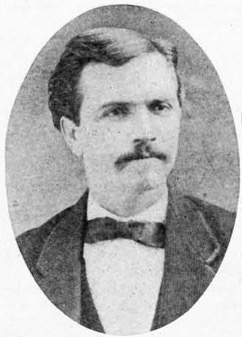
Comer in his mid-30s

Another of Comer's enterprises was Avondale Mills, which, with his sons' help, became one of the largest textile companies in Alabama. The Trainer family, who had a textile business in Chester, Pennsylvania, planned to expand its business into the South through the new and growing industrial city of Birmingham. It offered stock to business leaders, such as Frederick Mitchell Jackson Sr., who agreed to commit $150,000 to bring the mills to Birmingham. Jackson, president of Birmingham's Commercial Club, a forerunner of the Birmingham Area Chamber of Commerce, pledged "to help give employment to those badly in need of it in the young and struggling city of Birmingham." B. B. Comer's son, James McDonald Comer, later recalled that his father was motivated to participate in the new business by "feeling that Birmingham needed an industry which could employ women as well as men."

Accepting the businessman's pledges of financial participation, the Trainers sought a local investor to assume the presidency of the mill. In 1897, they approached Braxton Bragg Comer. The future governor accepted the offer and invested $10,000 into the enterprise. From 1897 until 1927, he served as president of Avondale Mills, directing continued expansion to new sites.

In 1897, Comer built the first mill in Avondale, an area that would become part of Birmingham. During the first year of its operation, Avondale Mills used 4,000 bales of cotton. By 1898, Avondale Mills employed 436 laborers and generated $15,000 in profit. By the time B. B. Comer became governor of Alabama in 1907, Avondale Mills had declared $55,000 in profit and produced almost 8,000,000 yards of material. By the turn of the century, Avondale Mills had set the course for future development.

Avondale Mills began with 30,000 spindles in the first mill in Birmingham and grew over the next thirty years to include ten mills in seven communities, totaling 282,160 spindles. The mills [included]: Eva Jane, the Central, the Sally B, and the Catherine in Sylacauga; the Alexander City Cotton Mills, the Sycamore Mills, Mignon, and Bevelle Mill, and the Pell City Manufacturing Company.

As cotton prices fell, poor white farmers lost their land and turned to sharecrop and tenancy.

Although a common practice at the time, the mills used child labor. See Avondale Mills.

== Railroad Commission ==
Comer was a vocal advocate for railroad reform. Alabama business owners were at a disadvantage when competing for business with companies based in Georgia due to that state's lower freight rates. The Birmingham Commercial Club and the Birmingham Freight Bureau, organizations in which Comer had significant roles, found evidence of railroad rate discrimination. Comer believed giving more power to the state's Railroad Commission was the best way to end the discrimination and lower rates to a level allowing Alabama companies to compete with those in Georgia. But, the state legislature and delegates to the 1901 Constitutional Convention did not strengthen the commission's power.

When the Railroad Commission did not change rates after two more years, Comer switched tactics to run for a seat on the commission, which had recently been converted to an electoral office. He campaigned to limit the power of the railroads in favor of shipping. In 1904, he was elected commission president but quickly realized he had little power due to the other two commissioners siding with the railroads. Three years into his term as president, Comer concluded that he could only enact railroad reform by becoming governor.

== Political Background ==
=== Eufaula Massacre of 1874 and Political Intimidation ===
Comer played a part in the 1870s white supremacist campaign of terrorism that led to the disenfranchisement of Blacks. He and his brother, Wallace, led a Spring Hill, Alabama, mob that carried out the Eufaula Massacre of 1874. On Election Day, Comer led the White League to disrupt the election and ambushed a group of around 1,000 Black men going to the polls. The mob massacred at least seven Blacks, shot at least seventy more, and prevented the rest of the crowd from voting. That evening some of Comer's mob stormed an office where ballots were being counted, burned the ballots so the white candidate could declare victory, and murdered the 16-year-old son of an elections supervisor. When a witness named Comer as a leader of the mob, the witness was falsely charged with perjury, intimidating others from coming forward.

The disfranchisement of blacks by the 1901 constitution and suffrage amendment had reduced the Republican Party as an active force in the state. For more than 60 years, until federal civil rights legislation was passed to enforce the constitutional rights of African Americans in the mid-1960s, Alabama was essentially a one-party state, with elections won in the Democratic primaries.

=== Gubernatorial Campaign of 1908 ===
The 1906 gubernatorial campaign in the Democratic primary...was notable as the party "dropped the word 'Conservative' from its formal name, demonstrating that it was comfortable with a more progressive platform." The party's gubernatorial candidates were progressive on almost every topic. However, as Lieutenant Governor Russell M. Cunningham of Birmingham did not support railroad reform on rates, he gained support from the industry.

Comer was criticized because of his known opposition to child labor laws; he said families should be the ones to decide about their children. Comer was "a better campaigner and orator than Cunningham, and his verbal attacks on the railroads so aroused Alabama audiences that he won the primary with 61 percent of the vote and the November election with more than 85 percent." Comer, representing the planter elite and rising businessmen, easily defeated Asa E. Stratton of the Republican Party and J. N. Abbott of the Socialist Party of America in the November 1906 election. Comer's plan to enact reform of the railroads, as well as in other areas such as education, appeared a strong possibility as progressive Democrats favoring reform constituted a majority in the newly elected, Democratic-dominated state legislature.

== Comer's administration ==
=== Railroad reform ===
Comer "devoted most of his inaugural address to the issue of railroad reform and requested the legislature pass 20 separate laws to give the railroad commission strong rate-making and enforcement powers." The like-minded legislature passed his railroad reforms with only a few changes. Through these new laws, Comer finally achieved lowering the rates to enable Alabama businesses to better compete with their counterparts in neighboring states.

The state legislature "added a provision that would revoke the state business license of any corporation bringing suit in federal court on any issue already before a state court." L&N Railroad and other railroads challenged the new railroad statutes in federal court. The disagreement between the state government and the railroad continued after Comer had left office. Still, he achieved his goal "to give the state increased regulatory power over railroad freight rates."

=== Response to 1908 miners' strike ===
In 1908, 7,000 (mostly white) miners went on strike at the Tennessee Coal, Iron and Railroad (TCIRR) and other mining operations in Alabama. They were joined by 500 African-American convicts leased from the state. Company officials petitioned the state to break up the strike with state militia. To keep operating, TCIRR officials pushed the African-American convicts to work extremely long hours. White foremen brought in additional bonded African Americans as convict labor as well. William Millin, a prominent African-American union leader, protested these conditions and was arrested. A mob took him from jail and lynched him. Another African-American organizer was hanged in a lynching a week later. Governor Comer issued orders mobilizing the state militia to break up the strikers and their organized camps.

In mid-August 1908, a delegation of prominent Birmingham citizens visited leaders of the striking miners and issued an explicit threat. They said that unless the strike ended, Birmingham would "make Springfield [Illinois] (where 12,000 whites had burned down the African-American section of the city) look like six cents.". Governor Comer said, "We are outraged at the attempts to establish social equality between black and white miners." He added that he would "not tolerate eight or nine thousand idle niggers in the state of Alabama."

=== Educational reform ===
Comer's reforms to improve education for whites were funded by increased revenues to the state. A State Board of Assessors was created "to equalize taxation by equalizing property values throughout the state and establishing franchise taxes for businesses." The reassessment of property values angered the large property owners who saw their property taxes increase. But, the major increases in state tax revenues came about not through taxation reforms (although this probably stabilized tax revenues) but through the increase in revenues generated from convict labor leased from the state to private enterprise.

Comer's administration applied the increases in spending for the education only of white students. Comer directed funds to the building of white rural schools and county high schools (at least one in each county), and increasing the appropriations made to the University of Alabama, the Alabama Polytechnic Institute in Auburn, the nine agricultural schools, the normal schools, and the Girl's Technical School at Montevallo. In addition, the state took control of the Alabama Boy's Industrial School. Comer's educational reforms influenced the state's educational system for a century.

More than 25 percent of the state's revenue in 1910 was derived from leasing African-American convicts to private enterprises. The journalist Douglas Blackmon notes that Comer based his improvements for white citizens on funds derived from the slave labor of African Americans. The curriculum level was raised for white students, with resulting increases in literacy, but in the segregated system, African Americans did not get equal funding for their educational system. Under Comer, the money spent on education for black children on a per capita basis was one-seventh that for white children. Literacy climbed dramatically for whites but lagged for blacks (by 1920, the rate was less than 50% for African Americans in Alabama).

Comer adamantly asserted that investment by the state in its educational infrastructure was "of the utmost importance, advising the legislature "...to be liberal in their appropriations to the University of Alabama, Auburn (University), (The University of) Montevallo, all the schools of Alabama, as much so as the finances of the state will admit, because the investment is the best."

A testament to Comer's emphasis on education as the supreme attribute of any society, one of his final actions was to direct the construction of the Catherine Comer School in Barbour County. Due to mandatory segregation in educational facilities at the time, only white children could attend the Catherine Comer School. To ensure that all had access to educational opportunities, Comer also directed the construction of the Beckie Comer School, also in Barbour County.

== Prohibition ==
Progressives were divided on prohibition, with some believing it should be decided by local jurisdictions and others supporting the passage of state laws against the sale of alcohol. During his gubernatorial campaign and first two years as governor, Comer viewed prohibition as a local matter. "By 1908…50 of the state's 67 counties had voted for prohibition." Despite the majority of the counties being "dry," the powerful Anti-Saloon League pushed for statewide prohibition. Other prohibition groups rallied to the League's push for a statewide law, forcing Comer to call the legislature into a special session to decide the matter. The 1909 special session enacted prohibition statewide, "but, not content with a mere statute, they also proposed a constitutional amendment to end the sale of liquor." Comer traveled the state to garner support for the proposed amendment, but it failed to win enough votes.

Comer noted, "Just as we would separate cholera from hogs, ticks from cattle, and boll weevils from cotton, so we should separate from youth of the state all that would deteriorate and destroy."

== Later life ==
As state law prevented governors from running for successive terms, Comer was ineligible for the 1910 gubernatorial election. In the election of 1914, Comer was defeated by a candidate supported by an "unlikely coalition" of railroads, organized labor, and supporters of local option [for prohibition].

In the spring of 1920, Governor Thomas Kilby appointed Comer to serve the remaining months of the late John H. Bankhead's term in the United States Senate. He did not seek election when the term expired.

Following his short time in the Senate, Comer spent the remainder of his life following his business pursuits. Aside from issuing his endorsement for Alabama gubernatorial candidate A.H. Carmichael, Comer refrained from political activity following his term in the U.S. Senate.

Comer died on August 15, 1927. His wife, Eva Jane, died on March 6, 1920, while he was serving in the Senate. He and his wife were survived by their nine children: Sally Bailey, John Fletcher, James McDonald, Eva Mignon, Catherine, Braxton Bevelle, Eva, Braxton Bragg Jr., and Hugh M. Comer. He was buried in Birmingham's Elmwood Cemetery.

== Legacy ==
By the mid-20th century, Comer was hailed as a reformer who brought Alabama's primary and secondary educational systems into the mainstream. He was praised for his business savvy and efforts to bring Avondale Mills to Birmingham and Central Alabama. He relied on a system of segregation and child labor to earn profits for his plantations, mines, and mills.

His improvements to Alabama's educational systems benefitted white students, while African-American schools and students were underfunded. Literacy rates for whites increased during his tenure as governor. The Democratic legislature consistently underfunded African-American education.

Comer also helped establish a tuberculosis sanatorium as part of using state funds to improve public health. He also strengthened insurance laws.

Encouraged by President Theodore Roosevelt's initiative to conserve natural resources, Comer gained legislation to establish the Alabama Soil Conservation Department; it was to oversee a public park system in the state.

He increased transportation funding to improve roads as part of the state's basic infrastructure.

Much of the early 20th century's industrial growth and productivity in Birmingham, although to a lesser degree, in all of Alabama, can be attributed to Comer's regulation of the railroad industry and his investment in the textile industry.

Although criticized early in his career as an industrialist for his attitudes towards child labor, Comer progressed with the common attitude and, as governor, passed a relatively progressive law requiring that no child under 12 years of age be employed at a textile mill. Also, as governor, Comer passed another law mandating that children under 16 who were employed in mills attend school for at least eight consecutive weeks each school term.

Comer was successful in turning back the peonage investigation. The use of convict lease labor continued to provide incentives to police and local officials to entrap, convict and lease African Americans as laborers.

The Comer Foundation, established in his name and headquartered in Birmingham, provides substantial scholarships to students living in the Alabama counties where Comer's mills once operated.

More recently, Comer has been recognized as a progressive politician who advocated for increasing state revenue sources to benefit residents experiencing low incomes. Described as "no flaming liberal and...flawed like any person in history", Comer is recognized for his progressive stance concerning adequately funding state-provided services.

Numerous institutions and places were named for Comer:

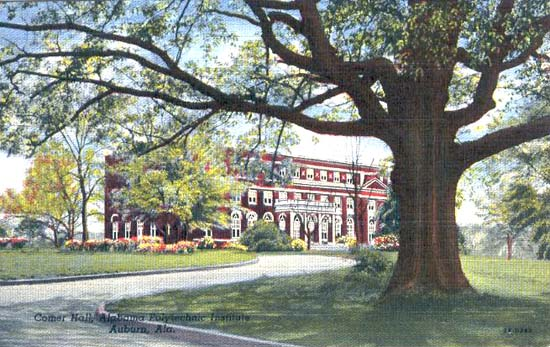
- Comer Hall at Auburn University
  B. B. Comer Memorial High School, B. B. Comer Memorial Elementary School, and B. B. Comer Memorial Library, all in Sylacauga, once home to one of Avondale's largest mills.
- B. B. Comer Hall at the University of Alabama houses the Department of Modern Languages.
- The federal building in Birmingham.
- Braxton Bragg Comer Hall at Auburn University houses offices and labs for the School of Agriculture.

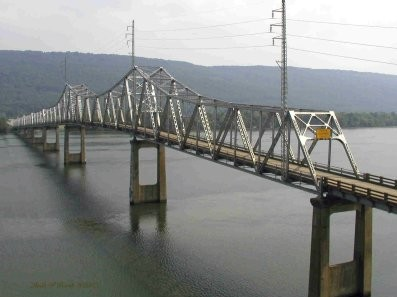
Comer Bridge, Scottsboro, AL

- B. B. Comer Bridge in Scottsboro, Alabama.

== See also ==
- J. W. Comer
- Hugh Comer
- Avondale Mills
- Governors of Alabama

== Further reading and works cited ==
- "Alabama Governors: Braxton Bragg Comer", Alabama Department of Archives and History
- "Comer, Braxton Bragg, (1848-1927)", Biographical Directory of the United States Congress
- "Braxton Bragg Comer", Alabama Men's Hall of Fame
- Kelly, Brian. Race, Class and Power in the Alabama Coalfields 1908-1921, Urbana: University of Illinois Free Press, 2001.
- Blackmon, Douglas A. 'Slavery By Another Name': The Re-Enslavement of Black Americans from the Civil War to World War II, New York: Anchor Books, 2008
- Bond, Horace Mann. Negro Education in Alabama: A Study in Cotton and Steel, Tuscaloosa: University of Alabama Press, 1994.
- Curtin, Mary Ellen. Black Prisoners and Their World, Alabama, 1865-1900, Charlottesville: University Press of Virginia, 2000.
- Daniel, Pete R. Shadow of Slavery: Peonage in the South, 1901-1969, Urbana, Ill.: University of Illinois Press, 1972/1990, text available at Googlebooks
- Dawson, Richard. Diary of Richard Dawson, Alabama Department of Archives and History, 1883
- ADAH, "Convicts at Hard Labor for the County in the State of Alabama on the First Day of March 1883," microfiche
- Flamming. Creating the Modern South: Mill Hands and Managers, Chapel Hill: University of North Carolina, 1992
- Hackney, Sheldon. Populism to Progressivism In Alabama (1969); online
- Hall. Like a Family the Making of a Southern Cotton Mill, Chapel Hill: University of North Carolina, 1987
- Harris, David Alan. "Braxton Bragg Comer (1907-11)", Encyclopedia of Alabama
- McWhorter, Lynn Price. "Avondale Mills", Encyclopedia of Alabama
- Mock, Gary. "Braxton Bragg Comer, Birmingham, Alabama", 2010
- Reed, Thomas Walter. History of the University of Georgia, Athens, Georgia : University of Georgia, ca. 1949,
- RG60 NA "Peonage Files, RG 60 NA ff5280-17119": National Archives
- Tuskegee Institute. The Lynching Century: African Americans Who Died in Racial Violence in the United States 1865-1965, database

Party political offices
| Preceded by William D. Jelks | Democratic nominee for Governor of Alabama; 1906 | Succeeded by Emmet O'Neal |
Political offices
| Preceded by William D. Jelks | Governor of Alabama; 1907–1911 | Succeeded by Emmet O'Neal |
U.S. Senate
| Preceded by John H. Bankhead | U.S. Senator (Class 2) from Alabama; 1920; Served alongside: Oscar Underwood | Succeeded by J. Thomas Heflin |
