= 1874 Election Massacre =

White supremacist massacre of African Americans

Election massacre of 1874
- Part of the Reconstruction Era
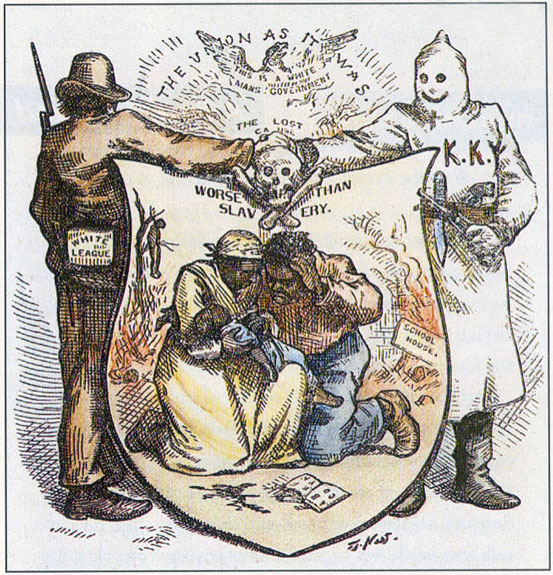
- Location: Eufaula, Alabama
- Date: November 3, 1874
- Target: Republican voters, and county officials
- Attack type: Coup d'état; Electoral fraud; Mass murder
- Deaths: At least 7 Black Republicans and 1 son of a Republican judge were killed
- Injuries: at least 70
- Perpetrator: White League

The Election Massacre of 1874, or Coup of 1874, took place on election day, November 3, 1874, near Eufaula in Barbour County, Alabama. Freedmen comprised a majority of the population and had been electing Republican candidates to office. Members of an Alabama chapter of the White League, a paramilitary group supporting the Democratic Party's drive to regain political power in the county and state, used firearms to ambush Black Republicans at the polls.

In Eufaula, members of the White League killed an estimated 15-40 black voters and wounded 70, while driving away more than 1,000 unarmed black people at the polls. In attacking the polling place in Spring Hill, the League effectively hijacked the elections. They turned all Republicans out of office and Democratic candidates took a majority of offices up for election.

== Background ==
The White League had formed in 1874 as an insurgent, white Democratic paramilitary group in Grant Parish and nearby parishes on the Red River of the South in Louisiana. The League was founded by members of the white militia who had committed the Colfax Massacre in Louisiana in 1873, killing numerous black people in order to turn out Republicans from parish offices as part of the disputed 1872 gubernatorial election. Historians such as George Rabe consider groups such as the White League and Red Shirts as a "military arm" of the Democratic Party. Their members worked openly to disrupt Republican meetings, and attacked and intimidated voters to suppress black voting. They courted press attention rather than operating secretly, as had the Ku Klux Klan.

Chapters spread to Alabama and other states in the Deep South. A similar paramilitary group was the Red Shirts, which originated in Mississippi and became active in the Carolinas. Both paramilitary groups contributed to the Democrats' regaining control in the state legislatures in the late 1870s. The Red Shirts were still active in the 1890s and were implicated in the Wilmington massacre of 1898 in North Carolina. In the days leading up to the election, the commanding officer in Eufaula was expecting trouble but was ordered by the headquarters in Kentucky to stay away from the local officials over the polls and not interfere with the election under any circumstance.

== Events ==
On the eve of the 1874 election, approximately 1,000 black Republicans were camped outside of Eufaula. While rumors spread throughout the white community that black Republicans would attempt an invasion. On election day, November 3, 1874, an Alabama chapter of the White League repeated actions taken earlier that year in Vicksburg, Mississippi. After the election started, an underage black Republican was caught attempting to vote. After being discovered by the white democrats, he was stabbed in an alleyway. The White League invaded Eufaula and, with firearms, ambushed Black voters as they marched down Broad Street, killing an estimated 15-40 black Republicans, injuring at least 70 more, and driving off more than 1,000 unarmed Republicans from the polls. The group moved on to Spring Hill, where members stormed the polling place, destroying the ballot box, and killing the 16-year-old son of a white Republican judge in their shooting.

The White League refused to count any Republican votes cast. But, Republican voters reflected the black majority in the county, as well as white supporters. They outnumbered Democratic voters by a margin greater than two to one. The League declared the Democratic candidates victorious, forced Republican politicians out of office, and seized every county office in Barbour County in a kind of coup d'état. Such actions were repeated in other parts of the South in the 1870s, as Democrats sought to regain political dominance in states with black majorities and numerous Republican officials. In Barbour County, the Democrats auctioned off as "slaves" (for a maximum cost of $2 per month) or otherwise silenced all Republican witnesses to the events. They were intimidated from testifying to the coup if the case went to federal court. Eventually, the rioters stood before a grand jury, and the grand jury blamed the "militant" black Republicans for the tense atmosphere in Eufaula.

== Legacy ==
Due to the actual and threatened violence by the White League, Black voters began to stay away from the polls in Barbour County. They no longer voted in sufficient number to retain a majority of Republican officeholders. White Democrats continued to intimidate black voters through the late 19th century, especially after a Populist-Republican alliance elected some Fusion candidates in the Deep South, as well as local Republican officials in many states.

In the 1874 election in Alabama, 29 797 more votes than in 1872 mainly went to Democrats. But African Americans and later democrats admit that the votes were fraudulent. After the 1874 election, the Alabama Democrats used intimidation to limit African American voters from voting for a constitutional convention and the election to ratify the Alabama Constitution.

In 1875, Mississippi Democrats also used widespread intimidation to control local elections, which became known as the Mississippi Plan. Such violence was adopted by chapters in other cities and counties. Democrats regained control of Alabama and other state legislatures. Reconstruction ended with the withdrawal of federal troops as part of a compromise to elect Rutherford B Hayes.

Historian Dan T. Carter concludes that "the triumph of white supremacy came at great cost, not only to the defeated Republican Party, but to the processes of government. Violence, already endemic in southern society, became institutionalized, and community leaders transformed the willful corruption and manipulation of elections into a patriotic virtue."

In 1901 the Democratic-dominated state legislature in Alabama, like other southern states, followed Mississippi's lead to end such election-related violence by passing a new constitution that effectively disenfranchised most black people by such measures as poll taxes, literacy tests, grandfather clauses and white primaries. Poll taxes and literacy tests also disfranchised tens of thousands of poor whites in Alabama. Although the Democratic legislature had promised whites would not be affected by the new measures, politicians wanted to preclude poor whites allying with black people in Populist-Republican coalitions. With disfranchisement achieved, the legislature passed laws imposing racial segregation and other elements of Jim Crow, a system that lasted well into the 1960s. At that time, the gains of the Civil Rights Movement led to Congressional passage of legislation in the mid-1960s that prohibited segregation and began to enforce the constitutional rights for minorities to suffrage and equal protection under the law.

In 1979, the state erected a "historical" marker located at the intersection of U.S. Highway 82 and Barbour County Road 49 near Comer, Alabama. The marker effectively blurred events – and their significance – in which the 1874 election supervisor Elias Kiels was assaulted and his son, Willie, was murdered while they were counting votes. The marker makes no connection to the murderous ambush on the same day in Eufaula, a few miles away. At Old Spring Hill, the terrorist mob, intent on disrupting the counting of ballots, was led by rich landowners Wallace Comer and his brother Braxton Bragg Comer. In the subsequent 1876 presidential election, "only ten black Republicans went to the polls in Eufaula." And three decades later, Braxton Bragg Comer, would benefit from the exclusion of Black voters in Jim Crow Alabama, being elected governor of the state.

The "historical" marker reads:

Near here is Old Spring Hill, the site of one of the polling places for the November 3, 1874 local, state and national elections. Elias M. Keils, scalawag and Judge of the City Court of Eufaula, was United States supervisor at the Spring Hill ballot box. William, his 16 year-old son, was with him. After the polls closed, a mob broke into the building, extinguished the lights, destroyed the poll box and began shooting. During the riot, Willie Keils was mortally wounded. The resulting Congressional investigation received national attention. This bloody episode marked the end of the Republican domination in Barbour County. - Erected by the Historic Chattahoochee Commission, 1979.

The 1874 election massacre is not mentioned in the Alabama state history curriculum, so the population does not widely remember the event. Due to this, there is no effort to correct the misrepresentation of the historical event portrayed on the historical marker.

== See also ==
- Freedmen massacres
