= American Banker =

Trade publication covering the financial services industry

- Cover of June 2025 issue
- Format: Online and Print; formerly a tabloid
- Owner: Arizent
- Editor-in-chief: Chana R. Schoenberger
- Language: English
- Headquarters: 1 State Street, 27th Floor; New York NY 10004; U.S.
- ISSN: 0002-7561
- Website: www.americanbanker.com

American Banker is a New York-based trade publication covering the financial services industry. Originally a daily newspaper, the print edition ceased publication in 2016, but continues to be published as a print magazine nine times a year.

The first issue of American Banker was published in 1885, although it has been considered a continuation of the earlier Thompson's Bank Note Reporter, a bank note reporter which began publication in 1842.

Although often confused with the American Bankers Association or other industry trade groups, American Banker is unaffiliated with any portion of the banking industry. It is an independent trade publication.

== History ==
American Banker claims descent from Thompson's Bank Note Reporter, a periodical published by John Thompson. For this reason, American Banker's masthead gives a founding date of 1836, though the best available evidence suggests that Johnson's paper began publication in 1842. (Note: For a more detailed overview of the sources related to the founding date of Thompson's publication, see Thompson's Bank Note Reporter § Notes.) During the free banking era, Thompson's Bank Reporter was the most widely read and trusted of the several dozen bank note reporters in print—a genre of periodical which published information about the market value of the notes printed by each of the hundreds of banks spread across North America, as well as up to date descriptions of counterfeit bills in circulation. In the mid-1860s, the traditional function of a bank note reporter became obsolete as a uniform national paper currency came to be adopted across the country; for this reason, the character of Thompson's Bank Note Reporter shifted toward that of a "bank directory". Around the same time, John Thompson sold the paper. It continued to change hands a number of times over the following twenty years, and its reputation declined. In 1884–1885, the paper was the subject of a scandal when it was found to have been attempting to blackmail banks across the country with threats of disparaging their reputation; the paper's publisher, L. P. Haver, ultimately avoided prison time by agreeing to cease publishing the paper.

In 1885, Charles David Steurer, who had been managing the printing of Thompson's Bank Note Reporter for some time, founded a publishing house, Stumpf & Steurer, with friend Anthony Stumpf. They launched American Bank Reporter, a bank directory similar to the latest incarnation of Thompson's, as well as American Banker, a weekly financial newspaper. American Banker became a daily newspaper in 1899.

=== The Otis years, ca. 1910-1983 ===
Members of the Otis family of Boston purchased the newspaper and its sister publication, Bond Buyer, around 1910, and for several decades it remained a family-owned enterprise. Charles Otis, a former president of The Wall Street Journal and its parent company, Dow Jones & Company, became president and publisher in 1913 and remained in that role until his death in 1944. In 1936, Charles Otis announced the newspaper was marking 100 years of continuous publication by producing a century edition. In 1976, the newspaper's management was overhauled. Willard S. Rappleye Jr., a former Time magazine editor was dismissed after 13 years at the helm. American Banker's president, Edward F. McDougal, resigned in protest, and financial editor Ben Weberman also resigned. William S.Shanks, president and minority owner of Bond Buyer, was named president of American Banker. A year later, Shanks was dismissed from both posts by Derick Otis Steinmann (1943-2002), an Otis family descendant.

Steinmann was Chairman and CEO of American Banker and Bond Buyer from 1976 to the mid-1980s. Steinmann transitioned the newspapers to the computer era, and facilitated their sale in 1983 to International Thomson, from the estate of Charles Otis.

=== Subsequent ownership ===
Thomson Corporation began selling its North American newspapers in 2000 and announced its intention to put American Banker and Bond Buyer on the market in 2001. In 2004, American Banker and Bond Buyer were sold to Investcorp, which operated it as part of its SourceMedia business. In 2014, Investcorp sold SourceMedia to Observer Capital, a private equity firm founded by Joseph Meyer, the publisher of The New York Observer.

== Staff ==
As of 2024, American Banker has approximately 30 U.S.-based reporters and editors, who monitor developments and breaking news affecting the banking industry.

Chana R. Schoenberger, who previously worked for Forbes, Bloomberg News, Dow Jones, and The Wall Street Journal, became editor-in-chief in January 2022. She had been editor-in-chief of Arizent’s wealth management publication, Financial Planning, since December 2020. Schoenberger replaced Alan Kline, a 22-year veteran of the newspaper, who was named editor-in-chief in January 2020, succeeding Rob Blackwell.

Other former editors of American Banker include Marc Hochstein, Neil Weinberg, Barbara A. Rehm, who was editor in chief from 2008 to 2010, and David Longobardi, who was editor in chief from 1999 to 2009, when he was named Chief Content Officer of SourceMedia Inc., the business media company that had owned American Banker since 2004. Edwin A. Finn topped the masthead in 1990–92, and Phil Roosevelt from 1995 to 1999. As of May 2012, Finn was editor and president and Roosevelt was deputy managing editor of Barron's.

== Online presence ==
American Banker launched an online edition in 1996, featuring all articles from the print edition as well as certain online-only features such as forums. In 2015, American Banker reported a reach of more than 365,000 professionals in banking and financial services.

In 2016, American Banker announced it was ending the print edition, while continuing to publish content online. The publication continues to publish a print magazine nine times per year.

== Awards ==
American Banker has won frequent journalism awards including, most recently, several from the Neals:, Azbees, and the National Association of Real Estate Editors.

In the 1980s, American Banker won two Gerald Loeb Awards and the George Polk Award for its coverage of two of the decade's major stories: The Chrysler bailout and the collapse of Penn Square Bank.
