= Lovability =

Lovability may refer to:

- Lovability (company), a company that designs, manufactures, and markets condoms
- Lovability (album), a 2011 album by ZE:A
