= John Thompson House (Highland, New York) =

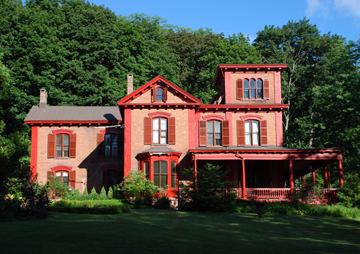
- House in 1998, eastern-facing side
- Interactive map of the John Thompson House area

General information
- Architectural style: Victorian Italianate
- Location: Highland, New York
- Coordinates: 41°43′5″N 73°57′24″W
- Completed: 1851

The John Thompson House is one of the best examples of Victorian Italianate style in Ulster County. It is located one-quarter mile from the Hudson River on Maple Avenue in Highland, New York

The house was built between 1854 and 1858 by John Thompson (1800–1891) for his wife Electa Ferris (1807–1902) as the family's country home in the Hudson Valley. John Thompson founded the First National Bank of the City of New York in 1863. With his sons, Samuel and Frederick, he founded the Chase National Bank in 1877, a predecessor of the Chase Manhattan Bank. The Thompson family's main house was on 297 Madison Avenue in New York City. The family affectionately called their summer home "The Anchorage".

The house across the street from the John Thompson House, also in the Italianate villa style, was a wedding gift by John Thompson to his niece.

== Design and architecture ==
The Anchorage is built in the Victorian Italianate villa (also known as Tuscan Villa Revival) style of designer Andrew Jackson Downing, an American landscape designer, horticulturist and writer of American architecture, who lived just down the Hudson River in Newburgh, New York. Andrew Jackson Downing's grand country designs with their highly decorated interiors were popular among wealthy American socialites of the Victorian Age. The house has been maintained as originally built with updates for modern amenities such as electricity.

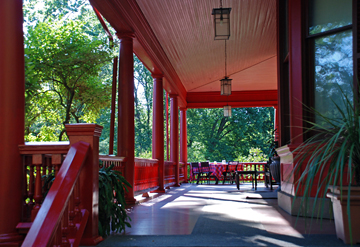
Veranda added in 1904.

Significant exterior design features include a Belvedere tower with elongated windows on three sides with views of Poughkeepsie, NY across the Hudson River. The Hudson River is now visible from the tower only in the winter when the trees have lost their leaves. Its broad verandas overlook multiple gardens that so often graced the grounds of country villa homes. The wrap-around porch is thought to have been added in 1904.

The house has sixteen rooms, five on the first floor, eight on the second, and three on the third. The five first-floor rooms are nearly twelve feet high. Seven of the ten fireplaces are made of sculpted imported Italian marble. Ten fireplaces provide heat during the spring and fall months while the house's northern orientation and double-brick walls provide protection from the summer heat. The rooms are decorated with ornate scroll and designed plaster. The center chandeliers in four rooms are surrounded by large plaster medallions. The large paneled doors are painted with wood grain, a common feature of ornate homes of the period, and are surrounded by 10-inch-wide (250 mm) moldings. The entry-way has a large marble floor and rounded staircases with scroll work on the side. The stairwell includes an arched niche built to hold decorative art.

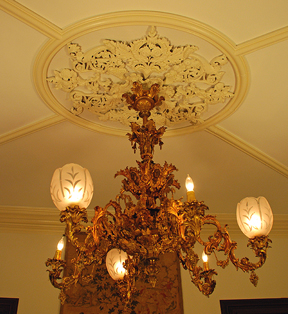
Four-Tier Victorian Chandelier.

A massive four-tier brass Italian gasolier (chandelier) in the living room is decorated with grape clusters that turned on the gas and women that hold up the glass globes. The chandelier is similar to one at Victoria Mansion (aka the Morse Libby House), in Portland, Maine. The lighting was originally gas and has since been converted to electricity.

The house's eight-foot double-hung windows contribute to the vertical Victorian design. The windows on the first floor include solid-wood interior folding shutters that fit into side pockets when folded in to let in the natural light. This innovation was added during the Victorian era to meet the preferences of the period to keep rooms dark and the thick walls made closing exterior shutters difficult to close.

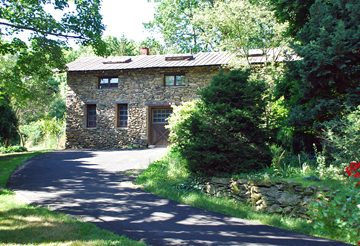
Carriage House, 1851.

The house was originally accompanied by a wood-frame gate house, stone barn and stone carriage house with a carriage pit to fix the underside of the carriages. The Thompson's gardener lived in a carriage apartment above the garage. The grounds have since been subdivided. The main house sits on 4.5 acres (18,000 m^{2}) and continues to be paired with the garage and gardener's apartment, while the barn and gate house have since been converted to single-family houses.

== Grounds ==
While the property upon which the house was built was deeded to Electa in 1864, additional property from the house to the Hudson River was deeded in 1876. The Thompson family enjoyed riding horses along bridle paths on the property that led to a bluff overlooking the Hudson.

The grounds were extensive, which was typical of Italianate villas of the time. More than 100 years later in 1975 over twenty-five types of trees including a 40-foot (12 m) larch tree, a deciduous fir, were visible from the veranda. The larch tree was later hit by lightning and fell in the 2000s. Many trees have remained and others added, including pear, cherry, peach and apple trees. Also on the grounds are blueberry, gooseberry, raspberry and currant bushes for picking.

One of the many gardens was used to raise vegetables. The Grange Notes of the town of Lloyd touted the farming skills of Maud Adams, a resident in the early 1900s, citing "the great variety of vegetables, finest pumpkins and squashes, and a field of corn stalks 12 feet (3.7 m) high.

Thompson Grove, the property between the house and the in-ground pool, served as local town gatherings. It was there that the centennial of the ratification of the Constitution of the United States was celebrated on August 1, 1888. John Thompson delivered an address at the event.

Multiple springs, managed by French drains throughout the property, feed into a 40-foot (12 m) circular stone in-ground pool that continues to provide refreshment on hot summer days.

== Residents and history ==
From 1851 to 1957, over 100 years, five generations of the Thompson family either summered or lived year-round at the Thompson House:

(1) John and Electa Thompson including children Eudora, Samuel and Federick; (2) Frederick and Eudora (Thompson) Adams, including children Frederick and Elinor; (3) Frederick T. and Maud Adams [later Patrick and Maud (Adams) O'Rourke, including daughter Mollie]; (4) Mollie O'Rourke, including daughter Patricia; (5) Patricia O'Rourke Welch.

John Thompson and Electa Thompson built the house in 1851 on land deeded to Electa by her father, Solomon Ferris (1776–1860). Electa's father and mother, Lydia Ferris (1775–1870), were natives of Highland and are buried on the Ferris Ground, Ulster County

John met Electa at a camp meeting at Thompson Grove on Maple Avenue, at that time owned by her father Solomon. John and Electa married in 1829 and had one daughter, Eudora Thompson (1832-?) and two sons, Samuel C. Thompson (1834–1884), and Frederick Ferris Thompson (1836–1899). Electa provided John the money to establish the First National Bank (see above).

John and Electa were generous benefactors of the Highland area. In 1872 Electa gave the funds necessary to build Holy Trinity Episcopal Church on Lower Grand Street, Highland, NY. Before living on Maple Avenue John and Electa bought a farm north of Highland at what is known now as West Park, NY. While living at the farm Electa gave West Park, NY its name.

Samuel Thompson served as the first president of the Chase National Bank until his death in 1884. In 1855 he was appointed as engineer-in-chief to the military staff of the New York State Governor, the Hon. Myron Holley Clark. He later served as director of the Pacific Mail Steamship Company, the Municipal Gas Company of New York, and the Panama Railroad.

In 1891, Frederick Thompson succeeded his father as president of Chase National Bank. Frederick served as a trustee of Williams College in Williamstown, MA, where he attended college ('56), and Vassar College (1885–1899) in Poughkeepsie, NY just across the Hudson River. Frederick was known on the Vassar College campus as "Uncle Fred" where he gave the funds to build The Thompson Library. The library continues to serve as the college's main library. In 1892 Frederick F. Thompson built his own summer home, the much larger Sonnenberg in Canandaigua, NY. Frederick married Mary Clark, the daughter of New York State Governor Myron H. Clark. They did not have children.

Eudora Thompson married Francis G. Adams, both of whom are listed in the New York Social Register. They had two children: Frederick T. Adams and Elinor Adams.

Frederick Adams married Maud Witherbee of Massachusetts who were also listed in the New York Social Register and summered in the John Thompson House. They kept their motor yacht, "Saladin," at the local marina. Maud Adams was one of the founders and a major benefactress of the Highland Free Library. She was also an active suffragette and pioneer in the Montessori method of teaching.

After Frederick's death, Maud married Patrick O'Rourke in 1920. They closed the home in 1923 and moved to San Diego, CA. Along with Patrick, Maud continued her philanthropy in San Diego by establishing the Zoological Institute for the education of children and an administration and entrance center for the San Diego Zoo. They continued to own the home until her death in 1937.

Residents after 1937 included 1938-1950: Mollie O'Rourke (1881–1950); 1951-1957: Patricia O'Rourke Welch, daughter of Patrick and Mollie O'Rourke; 1958 - 1971 L. Stephen (1914 - 2006) and Beth (Salisbury) Juillerat (1937- ); 1971-2011: Loyd E. (1939–2007) and Cynthia H. Lee (1940-); and 2011-: Berry DeJuan Stroud (1959-) and Debra Stroud (1959-).
