= John Thompson (American banker) =

American banker (1802–1891)

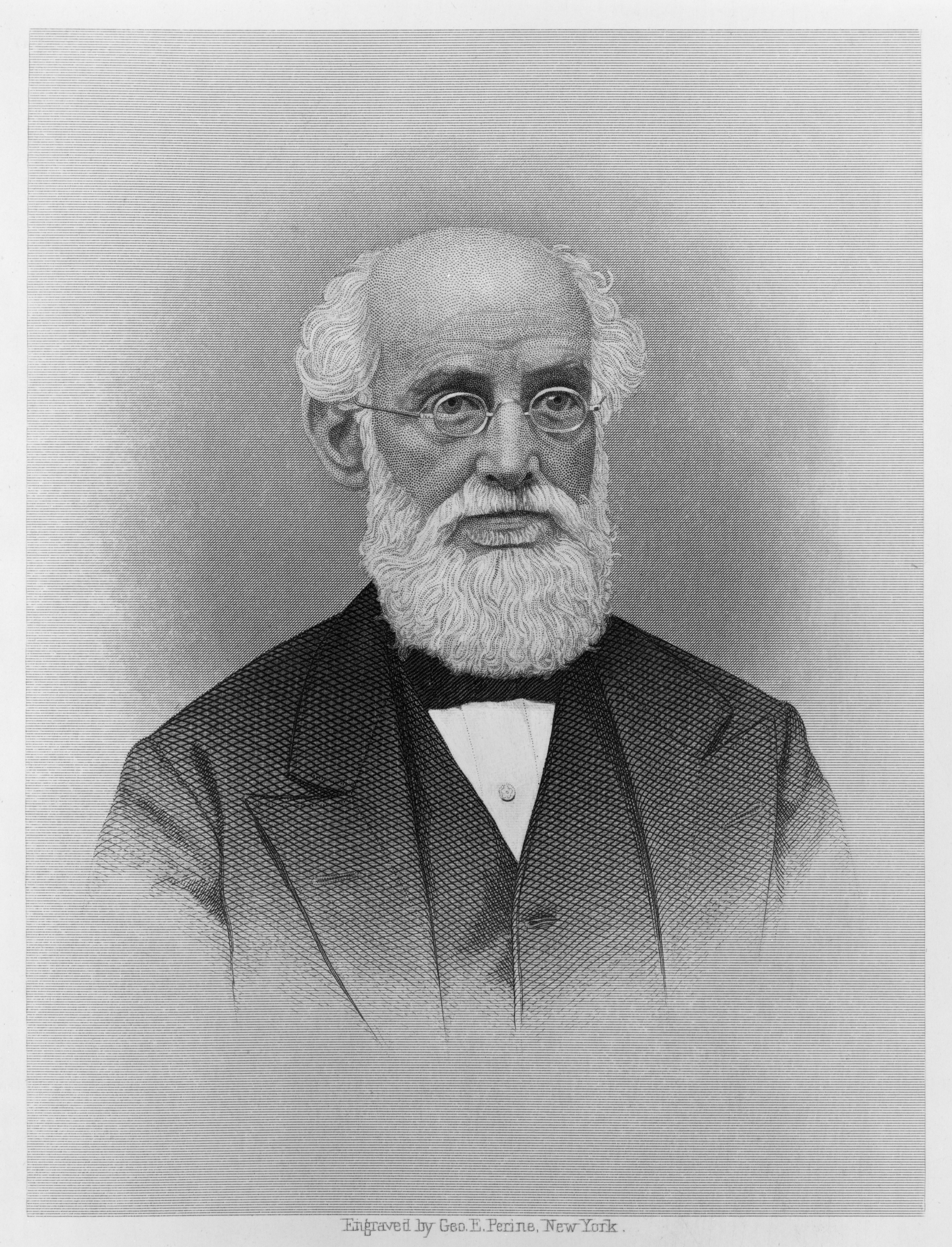
- Thompson in 1884
- Born: November 27, 1802; Peru, Massachusetts, US
- Died: April 19, 1891 (aged 88); Manhattan, New York, US
- Occupations: Banker; publisher
- Known for: Founder of First National Bank and Chase National Bank
- Spouse: Electa Ferris (m. 1828)
- Children: 6, including Frederick

John Thompson (November 27, 1802 – April 19, 1891) was an American banker, financial publisher, and dealer in bank notes.

== Early life ==
Thompson was born in Peru, Massachusetts, near Pittsfield on November 27, 1802. He was the son of a farmer and former Revolutionary War soldier.

== Career ==
At twenty years old, Thompson worked as a teacher in Hampshire County before becoming a lottery-ticket dealer in Poughkeepsie, New York with Yates & McIntyre (Archibald McIntyre and Henry Yates, brother of Governor Joseph C. Yates). The lottery scheme was legalized by the State Legislature for the benefit of Union College. In 1832, he left Poughkeepsie for New York City to become a dealer in bank notes.

In 1842, he founded Thompson's Bank Note Reporter. It was the most widely read and trusted of the several dozen bank note reporters in print during the free banking era—a genre of periodical which published information about the market value of the notes printed by each of the hundreds of banks spread across North America, as well as up to date descriptions of counterfeit bills in circulation. Alongside his bank note reporter, Thompson also came to publish a number of related titles, including a bank note list, a coin guide, and an "autographical counterfeit detector" (a catalogue of signatures of the presidents and cashiers of banks across North America). Thompson sold the Bank Note Reporter some time in the 1860s, around which time its character changed to be more of a "bank directory". It continued to be printed under Thompson's name until around 1884 or 1885.

In 1863, together with his sons, Samuel and Frederick, he founded First National Bank of the City of New York (a predecessor to today's Citibank); it opened its doors on July 22 of that year. George Fisher Baker became president of the bank after the Thompsons left the bank in the hands of Harris C. Fahnestock, a former partner of railroad financier Jay Cooke in the banking firm of Jay Cooke & Company, in 1877.

Thompson also founded Chase National Bank of the City of New York in 1877 (a predecessor to today's JPMorgan Chase Bank). The bank was named after his friend US Secretary of the Treasury Salmon P. Chase.

== Personal life ==
In 1828, Thompson was married to Electa Ferris (1808–1902), a daughter of Lydia Smith Ferris and Solomon Ferris. They resided in New York City at 295 Madison Avenue and summered at The Anchorage in Highland, New York. Together, Electa and John were the parents of six children, including:

- Melvina Thompson (1829–1832), who died in childhood.
- Irving Ferris Thompson (1832–1833), who died in infancy.
- Eudora Thompson (1832–1899), who married Francis G. Adams (1825–1903), a son of Herman Culyer Adams, in 1851.
- Samuel C. Thompson (1835–1884), who married Abigail E. Sherman (1841–1907), daughter of Edward T Sherman.
- Frederick Ferris Thompson (1836–1899), who married Mary Lee Clark, daughter of Governor Myron Holley Clark, in 1857.

After a severe illness that lasted four months, Thompson died on April 19, 1891, at his home in New York at 295 Madison Avenue. His wife died at her home in New York in September 1902 at the age of 95.
