= Accounting Today =

American trade magazine

- Cover of August 2025 issue
- Format: Online and Print
- Owner: Arizent
- Editor-in-chief: Daniel Hood
- Headquarters: One State Street Plaza, 27th Floor, New York NY 10004; US
- ISSN: 1044-5714
- Website: https://www.accountingtoday.com/

Accounting Today is a trade magazine servicing the public accounting profession in the United States serving a community of professionals who provide tax preparation, bookkeeping, auditing, financial planning, and business advisory and consulting services to individuals and businesses.

== Stats ==
Its website, AccountingToday.com, regularly reaches over 300,000 tax and accounting professionals; its daily newsletters reach close to 100,000 people five days a week. It also publishes a monthly print magazine, which goes out to 45,000 partners and managing partners at leading accounting firms.

== Events ==
Accounting Today produces a weekly podcast, On the Air with Accounting Today. The publication hosts upward of 50 CPE-qualified webinars every year, and in the spring of 2023 launched the Firm Growth Forum, a live conference for entrepreneurial accounting firms.

== History ==
Founded in 1987 as a biweekly trade magazine, Accounting Today has been owned by Arizent (formerly SourceMedia) since 2004. In 2009, it incorporated two other well-known accounting publications, The Practical Accountant and Accounting Technology.

== See also ==
- Accounting
- Certified Public Accountant
