= Chase Bank =

American bank headquartered in New York City

JPMorgan Chase Bank, N.A.
- Logo used since May 9, 2005.
- Trade name: Chase Bank
- Type: Subsidiary
- Industry: Banking
- Predecessor: The Manhattan Company
- Founded: September 1, 1799; 227 years ago
- Founder: John Thompson
- Headquarters: McCoy Center, Columbus, Ohio, U.S.
- Number of locations: 5,000 branches 15,000 ATMs nationwide 100 countries
- Area served: United States
- Key people: Jamie Dimon (chairman and CEO)
- Products: Financial services
- Services: Retail Financial Services; Card Services; Commercial Banking
- Revenue: US$124.54 billion (2022)
- Net income: US$42.12 billion (2022)
- Total assets: US$4 trillion (2022)
- Number of employees: 250,355 (2022)
- Parent: JPMorgan Chase
- Website: chase.com

Chase branches in the contiguous U.S. in 2026. The company also operates in Hawaii (not shown on the map).

JPMorgan Chase Bank, N.A., doing business as Chase, is an American national bank headquartered in Columbus, Ohio that constitutes the consumer and commercial banking subsidiary of the American multinational banking and financial services holding company, JPMorgan Chase. The bank was known as Chase Manhattan Bank until it merged with J.P. Morgan & Co. in 2000. Chase Manhattan Bank was formed by the merger of the Chase National Bank and the Manhattan Company in 1955. The bank merged with Chemical Bank New York in 1996 and later acquired Bank One Corporation in 2004 and in 2008 acquired the deposits and most assets of Washington Mutual. In May 2023, it acquired the assets of First Republic Bank.

Chase offers more than 5,000 branches and 15,000 ATMs nationwide and has 18.5 million checking accounts and 25 million debit card users as of 2023. JPMorgan Chase & Co. has 250,355 employees (as of 2016) and operates in more than 100 countries. JPMorgan Chase & Co. had assets of $3.31 trillion in 2022 which makes it the largest bank in the United States as well as the bank with the most branches in the United States and the only bank with a presence in all of the contiguous United States. JPMorgan Chase, through its Chase subsidiary, is one of the Big Four banks of the United States.

== History ==
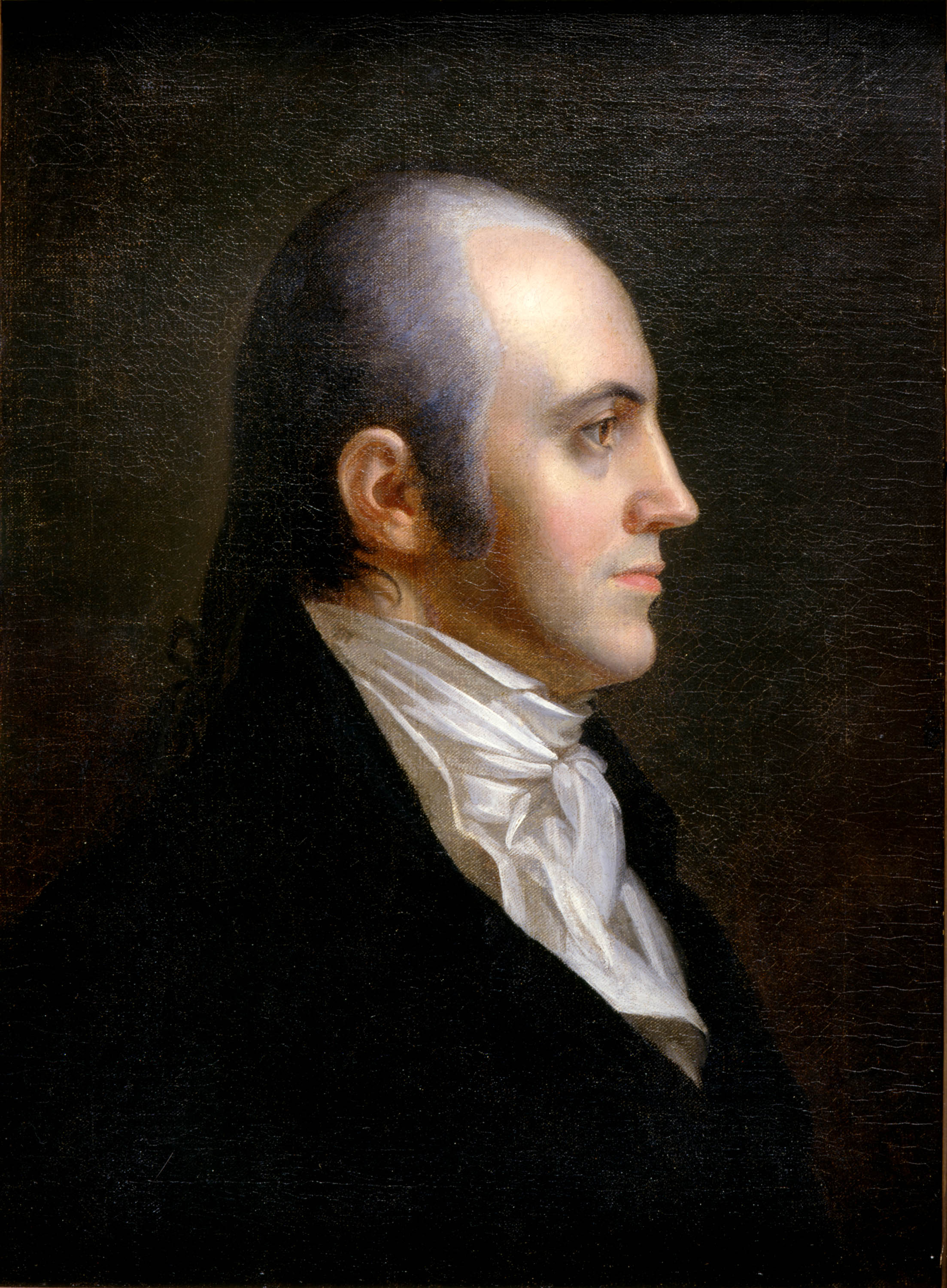
Aaron Burr, 3rd Vice President of the United States and founder of The Manhattan Company

The Bank of The Manhattan Company (New York) was founded on September 1, 1799, and continued under that name until 1955, when it merged with the Chase National Bank, which was founded in 1877; the merged bank was called The Chase Manhattan Bank.

=== The Manhattan Company ===
Chase traces its history back to the founding of The Manhattan Company by Aaron Burr on September 1, 1799, in a house at 40 Wall Street:

After an epidemic of yellow fever in 1798, during which coffins had been sold by itinerant vendors on street corners, Aaron Burr established the Manhattan Company, with the ostensible aim of bringing clean water to the city from the Bronx River but in fact, designed as a front for the creation of New York's second bank, rivaling Alexander Hamilton's Bank of New York.

— The Economist

In 2006, the modern-day Chase bought the retail banking division of the Bank of New York, which then only months later merged with Pittsburgh-based Mellon Financial to form the present-day BNY Mellon.

=== Chase National Bank ===
Chase National Bank was formed in 1877 by John Thompson. It was named after former United States Treasury Secretary and Chief Justice Salmon P. Chase, although Chase (having died four years earlier) did not have a connection with the bank.

The Chase National Bank acquired a number of smaller banks in the 1920s through its Chase Securities Corporation. In 1926, for instance, it acquired Mechanics and Metals National Bank.

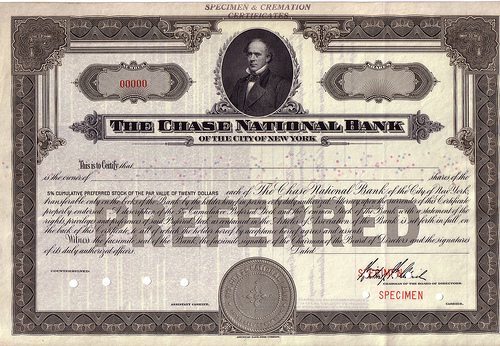
Specimen Stock Certificate

However, its most significant acquisition was that of the Equitable Trust Company of New York in 1930, the largest stockholder of which was John D. Rockefeller Jr. This made Chase the largest bank in the US and the world.

Chase was primarily a wholesale bank dealing with other prominent financial institutions and major corporate clients such as General Electric, which had, through its RCA subsidiary, leased prominent space and become a crucial first tenant of Rockefeller Center. They rescued that major project in 1930. The bank is also closely associated with and has financed the oil industry, having longstanding connections with its board of directors to the successor companies of Standard Oil, especially ExxonMobil, which are also part of Rockefeller holdings.

=== Merger as Chase Manhattan Bank ===
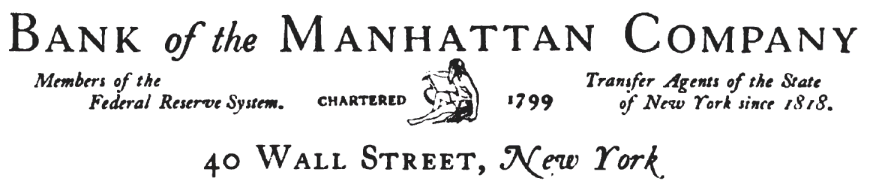
Manhattan Company (1799–1955) letterhead c. 1922

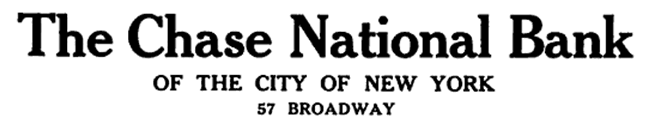
Chase National Bank (1877–1955) letterhead c. 1921

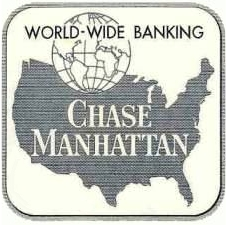
Logo as Chase Manhattan Bank from 1955–1961

Logo as Chase Manhattan Bank from November 22, 1960-1976

In 1955, Chase National Bank and The Manhattan Company merged to create the Chase Manhattan Bank. As Chase was a much larger bank, it was first intended that Chase acquire the "Bank of Manhattan", as it was nicknamed, but it transpired that Burr's original charter for the Manhattan Company had not only included the clause allowing it to start a bank with surplus funds, but another requiring unanimous consent of shareholders for the bank to be taken over. The deal was therefore structured as an acquisition by the Bank of the Manhattan Company of Chase National, with John J. McCloy becoming chairman of the merged entity. This avoided the need for unanimous consent by shareholders.

For Chase Manhattan Bank's new logo, Brownjohn, Chermayeff & Geismar designed a stylized octagon in 1960, and was officially rolled out on November 22. It remains part of the bank's logo today. It has been reported that the Chase logo was a stylized representation of the primitive water pipes laid by the Manhattan Company, but this story was refuted in 2007 by Ivan Chermayeff himself. According to Chermayeff, the Chase logo was merely intended to be distinctive and geometric, and was not intended at all to resemble a cross-section of a wooden water pipe. According to Chase, the sides of the octagon represent forward motion, while the blank space in the middle suggests progress originates from the center; and is a single unit made up of separate parts, like the bank. The bank included an asset management business called the Chase Investors Management Corporation. Under McCloy's successor, George Champion, the bank relinquished its antiquated 1799 state charter for a modern one. In 1969, under the leadership of David Rockefeller, the bank reorganized as a bank holding company, the Chase Manhattan Corporation.

The mergers and acquisitions during this period allowed Chase Manhattan to expand its influence over many non-financial corporations. A 1979 study titled "The Significance of Bank Control over Large Corporations" found that: "The Rockefeller-controlled Chase Manhattan Bank tops the list, controlling 16 companies." In 1985, Chase Manhattan expanded into Arizona by acquiring Continental Bank. In 1991, Chase Manhattan expanded into Connecticut by acquiring two insolvent banks.

=== Mergers with Chemical, J.P. Morgan ===
Chase logo from 1990-October 2005

In August 1995, Chemical Bank of New York and Chase Manhattan Bank announced plans to merge. The merger was completed in August 1996. Chemical's previous acquisitions included Manufacturers Hanover Corporation, in 1991, and Texas Commerce Bank, in 1987. Although Chemical was the nominal survivor, the merged company retained the Chase name since not only was it better known (particularly outside the United States), but also the original charter of Chase required that the name be retained in any future business ventures. Hence, even today, it is known as JPMorgan Chase.

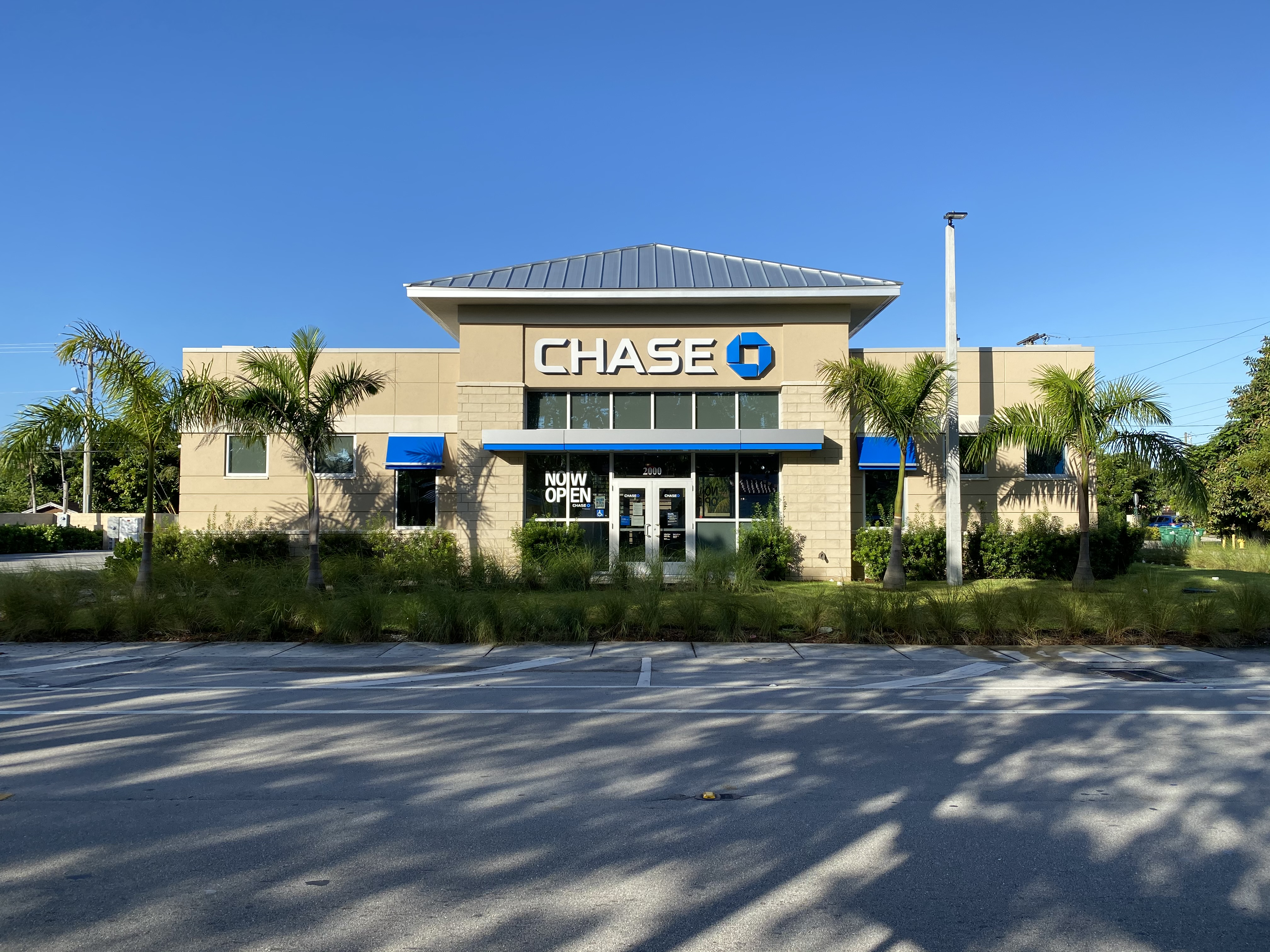
A Chase branch in Miami, Florida

In December 2000, the combined Chase Manhattan completed the acquisition of J.P. Morgan & Co. in one of the largest banking mergers to date. The combined company was renamed JPMorgan Chase. In 2004, the bank acquired Bank One, making Chase the largest credit card issuer in the United States. JPMorgan Chase added Bear Stearns and Washington Mutual to its acquisitions in 2008 and 2009 respectively. After closing nearly 400 overlapping branches of the combined company, less than 10% of its total, Chase will have approximately 5,410 branches in 23 states as of the closing date of the acquisition. According to data from SNL Financial (data as of June 30, 2008), this places Chase third behind Wells Fargo and Bank of America in terms of total U.S. retail bank branches.

In October 2010, Chase was named in two lawsuits alleging manipulation of the silver market. The suits allege that by managing giant positions in silver futures and options, the banks influenced the prices of silver on the Comex Exchange since early 2008.

The following is an illustration of the company's major mergers and acquisitions and historical predecessors to 1995 (this is not a comprehensive list):

- Chase Manhattan Bank (merged 1995)
  - Chemical Bank (merged 1991)
    - Chemical Bank (merged 1986)
      - The Chemical Bank
        of New York
        (est. 1823)
      - Texas Commerce Bank
        (Formerly Texas National Bank of Commerce)
        (merged 1864)
    - Manufacturers Hanover (merged 1961)
      - Manufacturers
        Trust Company
        (est. 1905)
      - Hanover Bank
        (est. 1873)
  - Chase Manhattan Bank (merged 1955)
    - Bank of the
      Manhattan Company
      (est. 1799)
    - Chase National Bank
      of the City of New York
      (est. 1877)

=== Bank One Corporation ===
In 2004, JPMorgan Chase acquired Chicago-based Bank One Corp., bringing on board its current chairman and CEO Jamie Dimon as president and COO and designating him as CEO William B. Harrison Jr.'s successor. Dimon's pay was pegged at 90% of Harrison's. Dimon quickly made his influence felt by embarking on a cost-cutting strategy and replaced former JPMorgan Chase executives in key positions with Bank One executives—many of whom were with Dimon at Citigroup. Dimon became CEO in January 2006 and chairman in December 2006 after Harrison's resignation.

Bank One Corporation was formed upon the 1998 merger between Banc One of Columbus, Ohio and First Chicago NBD. These two large banking companies were themselves created through the merger of many banks. JPMorgan Chase completed the acquisition of Bank One in Q3 2004. The merger between Bank One and JPMorgan Chase meant that corporate headquarters were now in New York City while the retail bank operations of Chase were consolidated in Chicago.

The following is an illustration of Bank One's major mergers and acquisitions and historical predecessors (this is not a comprehensive list):

- Bank One (merged 1998)
  - Banc One Corp (merged 1968)
    - City National Bank
      & Trust Company (Columbus, Ohio)
    - Farmers Saving
      & Trust Company
  - First Chicago Bank NBD (merged 1995)
    - First Chicago Corp
      (est. 1863)
    - NBD Bancorp
      (Formerly National Bank of Detroit)
      (est. 1933)
  - Louisiana's First
    Commerce Corp.

=== Washington Mutual ===
On September 25, 2008, JPMorgan Chase bought most banking operations of Washington Mutual from the receivership of the Federal Deposit Insurance Corporation (FDIC). That night, the Office of Thrift Supervision, in what was by far the largest bank failure in American history, seized Washington Mutual Bank and placed it into receivership. The FDIC sold the bank's assets, secured debt obligations and deposits to JPMorgan Chase Bank, NA for $1.888 billion, which re-opened the bank the following day. As a result of the takeover, Washington Mutual shareholders lost all their equity. Through the acquisition, JPMorgan became owner of the former accounts of Providian Financial, a credit card issuer WaMu acquired in 2005. The company completed the rebranding of Washington Mutual branches to Chase in late 2009.

=== Other recent acquisitions and expansions ===
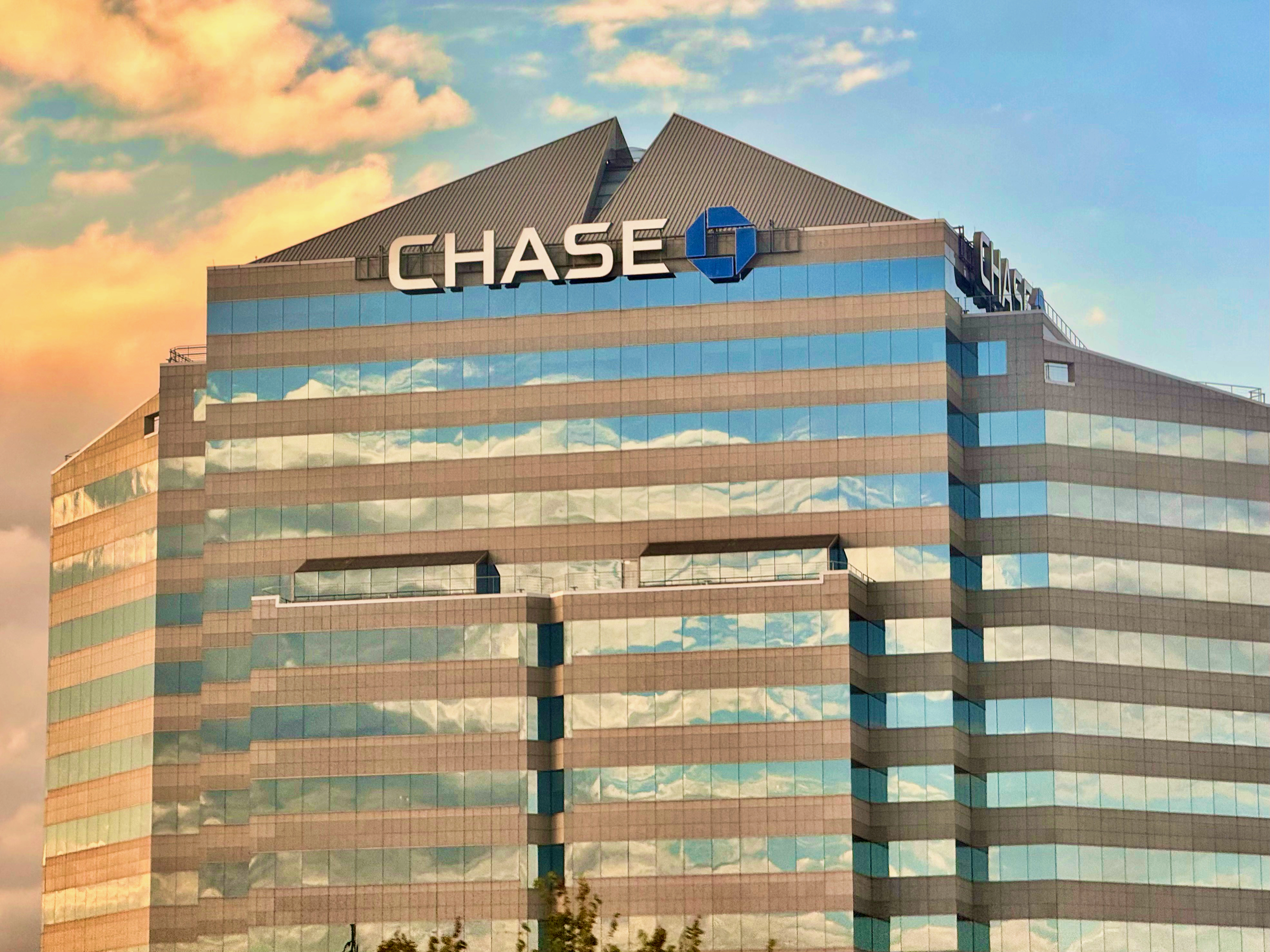
A Chase office center in Wilmington, Delaware, 2023

In the first quarter of 2006, Chase purchased Collegiate Funding Services, a portfolio company of private equity firm Lightyear Capital, for $663 million. CFS was used as the foundation for the Chase Student Loans, previously known as Chase Education Finance. In April of that same year, Chase acquired the Bank of New York Co.'s retail and small business banking network. This gave Chase access to 338 additional branches and 700,000 new customers in New York, New Jersey, Connecticut, and Indiana.

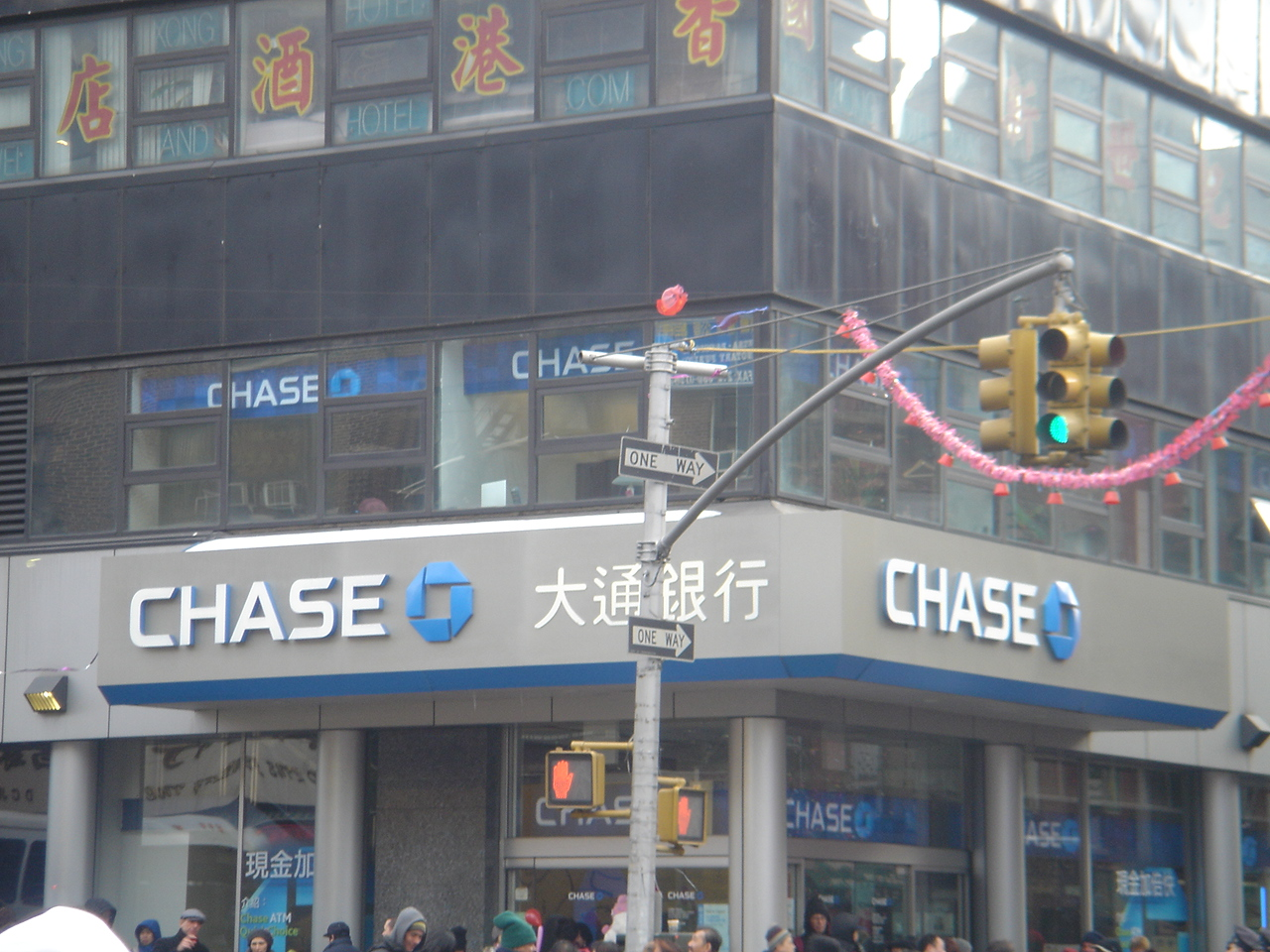
Chase bank in Chinatown, Manhattan

In 2019, Chase began opening retail branches in Pittsburgh and other areas within Western Pennsylvania; this coincided with Bank of America starting a similar expansion within the area the previous year. Even though Chase entered the market organically as opposed to a merger & acquisition, they still had to receive approval from the Office of the Comptroller of the Currency to open branches due to Chase's size as a whole. Before Chase and Bank of America expanded its retail presence into the market, Pittsburgh had been one of the largest U.S. cities without a retail presence from any of the "Big Four", with locally based PNC Financial Services (no. 6 nationally) having a commanding market share in the area. Chase had previously considered buying National City branches from PNC that were required for divestiture following that bank's acquisition of National City in 2009, but were instead sold to First Niagara Bank (since absorbed into KeyBank); it had been speculated that PNC intentionally sold the branches to a much smaller competitor due to not wanting to compete with a "Big Four" bank in its home market.

In August 2021, Chase announced that it was the first bank to have a retail presence in all 48 of the contiguous United States. The last state in the US to have a Chase branch was Montana, with the branch in Billings being the first branch in the state.

=== Expansion outside the US ===
In September 2021, JPMorgan Chase entered the United Kingdom retail banking market by launching an app-based current account and Deposit account under the Chase brand. This is the company's first retail banking operation outside of the United States. J.P. Morgan SE expanded this business model to Germany in May 2026.

== Controversies ==
=== World War II ===
==== Purchase of Nazi Germany's Reichsmarks ====
A press release from the National Archives and Records Administration (NARA) in 2004 announced that many of the new Federal Bureau of Investigation (FBI) files had become declassified. This declassification enabled the discovery that before and during the early years of World War II, the German government sold a special kind of Reichsmark, known as Rückwanderer [returnee] Marks, to American citizens of German descent. Chase National Bank, along with other businesses, were involved in these transactions. Through Chase, this allowed Nazi sympathizers to purchase Marks with dollars at a discounted rate. Specifically, "The financial houses understood that the German government paid the commissions (to its agents, including Chase) through the sale of discounted, blocked Marks that came mainly from Jews who had fled Germany." In other words, Nazi Germany was able to offer these Marks below face-value because they had been stolen from émigrés fleeing the Nazi regime. Between 1936 and 1941, the Nazis amassed over $20 million, and the businesses enabling these transactions earned $1.2 million in commissions. Of these commissions, over $500,000 went to Chase National Bank and its subagents.

These facts were discovered when the FBI began its investigation in October 1940. The purpose of the investigation was to follow German-Americans who had bought the Marks. However, Chase National Bank's executives were never federally prosecuted because Chase's lead attorney threatened to reveal FBI, Army, and Navy "sources and methods" in court. Publicly naming the sources and methods could have posed security risks and threatened future intelligence gathering. To avoid such revelations, the executives' violations of the Johnson Act, the Espionage Act, and the Foreign Agents Registration Act were never prosecuted.

During the occupation of France by the Nazis, there was a controversial scheme known as the Rückwanderer Mark Scheme. In addition to this, NARA records revealed another controversy involving the release of funds to Nazi Germany. From the late 1930s until June 14, 1941, when President Franklin D. Roosevelt (FDR) issued an Executive Order freezing German assets, Chase National Bank worked with the Nazi government. The order, which blocked access to French accounts in the U.S. by anyone, especially the Nazis, was issued by Secretary of the Treasury, Henry Morgenthau Jr., with the approval of FDR. Despite this order, Chase unblocked the accounts within hours and the funds were transferred through South America to Nazi Germany.

==== Refusal to release funds belonging to Jews in occupied France ====
U.S. Treasury officials wanted an investigation of French subsidiaries of American banks, including: Chase Bank, J.P. Morgan & Co, National City Corporation, Guaranty Bank, Bankers Trust, and American Express. Of these banks, only Chase and Morgan remained open in France during the Nazi occupation. The Chase branch chief in Paris, France, Carlos Niedermann, told his supervisor in New York that there had been an "expansion of deposits". Also, Niedermann was, "very vigorous in enforcing restrictions against Jewish property, even going so far as to refuse to release funds belonging to Jews in anticipation that a decree with retroactive provisions prohibiting such release might be published in the near future by the occupying Nazi authorities" .

In 1998, Chase general counsel William McDavid said that Chase did not have control over Niedermann. Whether that claim was true or not, Chase Manhattan Bank acknowledged seizing about 100 accounts during the Vichy regime. Kenneth McCallion, a partner in the New York firm Goodkind Labaton Rudoff & Sucharow, led a lawsuit against Barclays Bank for the illegal seizure of assets during World War Two and has since turned his attention toward Chase. The World Jewish Congress (WJC), entered into discussions with Chase and a spokesperson for the WJC said, "Nobody at Chase today is guilty. They were not involved in whatever happened, but they do accept that they have an institutional responsibility." A Chase spokesman said, "This is a moral issue that we take very seriously." Chase general counsel McDavid added, "that Chase intends to compensate Jewish account holders whose assets were illegally plundered". In 1999, the French government formed a commission to report findings to Prime Minister Lionel Jospin. Claire Andrieu, a commission member and history professor at the Sorbonne, said that under the Vichy regime, French banks received visits from Nazi officials but U.S. banks did not. At that time, they did not have to report Jewish accounts, but they did just as the French banks did. She goes on to say that an American ambassador protected the U.S. subsidiaries.

==== Related legal action ====
In May 1999, Chase Manhattan reached a settlement with 20 plaintiffs who filed an asset reparations lawsuit, such as the Claims Conference, a Jewish restitution organization, and the WJC. The settlement subjected Chase to an independent probe of its conduct of activity which occurred from the company's offices in Paris and Châteauneuf-sur-Cher, in southern France, during the World War II-era. The settlement also made possible the company having to eventually a pay modest but symbolically important, payouts to former Chase customers after the probe was completed. It was determined that Chase only owned a sum that was well under $1 million in asset reparations by this point in time. The settlement made Chase Manhattan the first bank to reach a settlement over Holocaust-related claims.

==== Public acknowledgement from Chase Manhattan ====
In February 2000, more than fifty years after information regarding the ties between Chase and Nazi Germany was revealed during Congressional hearings, Chase Manhattan publicly acknowledged the deal its predecessor Chase National Bank made with Nazi Germany which helped the German government exchange marks and which also likely originated from the forced sale of assets by Jewish refugees.

=== 2010s and 2020s ===
JPMorgan Chase has paid $16 billion in fines, settlements, and other litigation expenses from 2011 to 2013. Of the $16 billion JPMorgan Chase has paid, about $8.5 billion were for fines and settlements resulting from illegal actions taken by bank executives, according to Richard Eskow at the Campaign for America's Future, who cited a new report from Joshua Rosner of Graham Fisher & Co.

The $16 billion total does not include a recent settlement that calls for JPMorgan Chase to pay $100 million to waive $417 million in claims it had made against clients of the firm MF Global.

The U.S. Treasury's Office of Foreign Assets Control found that JPMorgan had illegally aided dictatorships in Cuba, Sudan, Liberia and Iran, including transferring 32,000 ounces of gold bullion (valued at approximately $20,560,000) to the benefit of a bank in Iran. JPMorgan did not voluntarily self-disclose the Iranian matter to OFAC.

Among its other transgressions, JPMorgan has been found to have:

- Misled investors
- Engaged in fictitious trades
- Collected illegal flood insurance commissions
- Wrongfully foreclosed on soldiers; charged veterans hidden fees for refinancing
- Violated the Federal Trade Commission Act by making false statements to people seeking automobile loans
- Illegally increased their collection of overdraft fees by processing large transactions before smaller ones
- Helped drive Jefferson County, Alabama, into bankruptcy by switching its fixed-rate debt to variable
- Violated antitrust provision of the Sherman Act relating to bid rigging
- Stole and auctioned items from deposit boxes of private individuals and governments.

==== Targeted account closures ====
During 2013 and 2014, Chase and other banks received media attention for the practice of cancelling the personal and business accounts of hundreds of legal sex workers, citing in some instances the "morality clause" of their account agreement. Later it was discovered that this practice included mortgage accounts and business loans. Chase canceled the mortgage refinancing process for one individual, which the bank had initiated, whose production company made soft core films like those broadcast on Cinemax. This resulted in a lawsuit which cited evasive dealings and misleading statements by several Chase executives including Securities Vice President Adam Gelcich, Legal Fair Lending Department Vice President Deb Vincent, and an unnamed executive director and assistant general counsel.

In addition to closing accounts for sex workers, the bank has also been using its "morality clause" to disassociate from other types of businesses. Some of these other businesses include medical marijuana dispensaries and any that are "gun related". Another was a woman-owned condom manufacturing company called Lovability Condoms. Company founder Tiffany Gaines was rejected by Chase Paymentech services "as processing sales for adult-oriented products is a prohibited vertical" and was told that it was a "reputational risk" to process payment for condoms. Gaines then started a petition to ask Chase to review and change its policy of classifying condoms as an "adult oriented product". The bank later reversed its decision and invited Gaines to submit an application citing that was already doing business with a "wide variety of merchants, including grocers and drug stores, that sell similar products".

In 2019, the bank faced growing criticism for its alleged practice of arbitrarily targeting the personal accounts of outspoken online personalities such as Martina Markota and Proud Boys chairman Enrique Tarrio. Although the specific motives behind the closures were not officially disclosed the assumption among many on the right was that they were political in nature.

==== Dakota Access Pipeline ====
Financial documents from Energy Transfer Partners, the pipeline builder for the Dakota Access Pipeline, lists a number of large banking institutions that have provided credit for the project, including JPMorgan Chase. Because of these financial ties, Chase and other banks were a target of the Dakota Access Pipeline protests during 2016 and 2017.

==== Parental leave policy ====
JPMorgan Chase agreed to pay $5 million to compensate their male employees who did not receive the same paid parental leave as women from 2011 to 2017. In December 2017, the bank "clarified its policy to ensure equal access to men and women looking to be their new child's main caregiver". According to the involved attorneys, this is the biggest recorded settlement in a U.S. parental leave discrimination case. JPMorgan agreed to train and monitor to ensure equal parental leave benefits and stated that "its policy was always intended to be gender-neutral".

==== Fossil fuel investment ====
Chase has faced criticism and protests over its high rate of investment in various fossil fuel industries such as coal, oil, and gas. A study released in October 2019 indicated that Chase invests more ($75 billion) in fossil fuels than any other bank.

==== Unequal lending practices ====
An analysis of home purchases in Chicago from 2012 to 2018 by City Bureau and WBEZ Chicago showed that JPMorgan Chase, "loaned 41 times more in Chicago's white neighborhoods than it did in the city's black neighborhoods". The report prompted protests at Chicago Chase branches in June 2020. At a reopening of a remodeled Chase branch in Chicago's South Shore, Dimon said via video, "we have targets now to do $600 million (over the next five years) in new mortgages for Blacks and new homeowners in Chicago neighborhoods".

==== Facilitation of sex trafficking ====
The U.S. government sued JPMorgan Chase Bank in 2022, alleging that the bank "facilitated, sustained, and concealed the human trafficking network operated by Jeffrey Epstein."

==== ATM glitch incident ====
In 2024, a glitch occurred in Chase's ATMs which allowed users to withdraw money using fraudulent checks. This type of bank fraud is commonly known as check kiting.
