= Lovability (company) =

American condom company

Lovability Incorporated
- Industry: Sexual Health & Wellness products
- Founder: Tiffany Gaines; Pam Gaines
- Headquarters: Los Angeles, United States
- Area served: Worldwide
- Products: prophylactics (condoms), personal lubricant, and sex toys
- Owner: Maureen Pollack, Kamini Sharma, John Paul Basile
- Website: lovabilityinc.com

Lovability Incorporated is an American company that designs, manufactures, and markets condoms, personal lubricant, and other sexual health & wellness products. The company is based in Los Angeles.

Lovability's condoms

== History ==
Lovability was founded in New York City in 2014 by Tiffany Gaines, the company's initial president and CEO.

Gaines credits a "humiliating personal experience" as inspiration for the company and product. She explains her experience purchasing tampons at a convenience store in front of a group of men as the main influence on her decision to found the company: the tampons were located high on a shelf behind the register, next to the condoms. This led to the idea to change the perception of condoms as a male-oriented product and to destigmatize their purchase and carrying by women. The result of this idea was condoms in gold wrappers that come in small tins that aim to be more aesthetically appealing than traditional condoms.

=== Fundraising ===
In 2015, Lovability started a funding campaign on the crowd-funding website IndieGoGo. As of February 2015, it had attained 184% of its targeted amount. In conjunction with the campaign, they produced a video based on testimony from individuals found in New York's Union Square to show why women are resistant to carrying condoms.

=== Ownership Change ===
In February 2019, Lovability was acquired by a women-led investor group, headed by Maureen Pollack and co-owners, Kamini Sharma and John Paul Basile, who are former sports and entertainment senior executives.

== Operations ==
The company has multiple marketing and operational objectives that were laid out in a 2013 Forbes article. An eight-point plan was presented that includes:

- Making condoms available for purchase in places that condoms aren’t typically available such as beauty supply stores, lingerie stores, department stores, and accessory boutiques
- The use of packaging that is "chic, discrete [sic], and resembles a high-end cosmetic product".
- Promotion of condoms on college campuses to educate others on the importance of safe sex and use the product to raise money for their designated philanthropy.
- Encouraging women to take charge of their sexual health and practice self-love.
- Use of an e-commerce website so that women can send condoms either with a personalized note or anonymously.
- Use of celebrity spokespeople, such as the cast members of MTV’s Teen Mom series.
- Engaging women of all ages.
- Being responsive and adaptive based on customer feedback.

== Chase Bank ==
In 2014, the company was initially rejected by Chase Bank when they attempted to utilize Chase Paymentech services. Chase notes that "as processing sales for adult-oriented products is a prohibited vertical," it was too much of a "reputational risk" for them to process payment for condoms. Gaines started a petition to ask Chase to review and change its policy of classifying condoms as an "adult-oriented product." The petition gained 3,400 signatures in its first week. The bank later reversed its decision and invited Gaines to submit an application citing that it was already doing business with a "wide variety of merchants, including grocers and drug stores, that sell similar products."

Gaines stated that she does not plan to use Chase Paymentech's services until she feels confident that no other condom companies will face the resistance that she did.
