= National Mortgage News =

American trade magazine

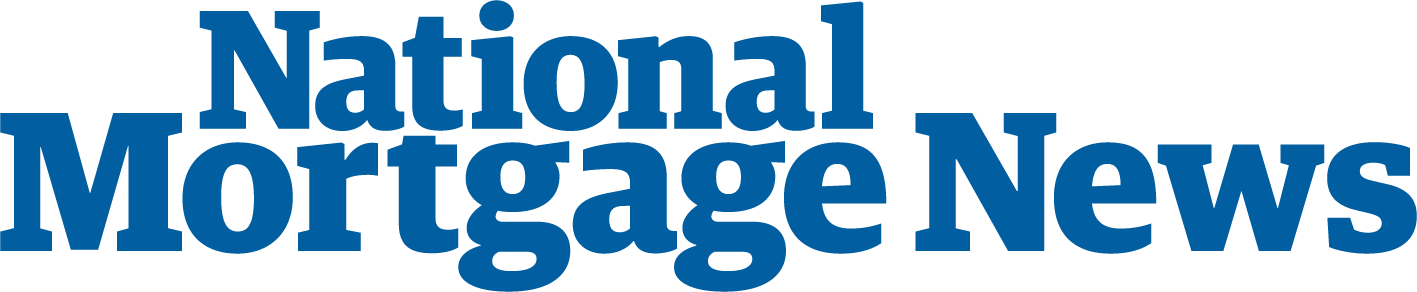

- Cover of May 2025 issue
- Format: Online and Print
- Owner: Arizent
- Editor-in-chief: Heidi Patalano
- Language: English
- Headquarters: One State Street Plaza, 27th Floor, New York NY 10004; US
- ISSN: 1050-3331
- Website: https://www.nationalmortgagenews.com/

National Mortgage News is a digital media website covering the mortgage sector in the United States. Its editor-in-chief is Heidi Patalano. National Mortgage News is owned by Arizent.

== History ==
National Mortgage News's predecessor, National Thrift News, was founded in 1976 by Stan Strachan, Wesley Lindow, and John R. Glynn. In 1988 National Thrift News won the Polk Award in Financial Reporting for its coverage of the savings and loan crisis; in September 1987 it had been the first media outlet to break the Keating Five story. In 1989, it was the first to report on political considerations having delayed the closing of the Neil Bush-directed Silverado Savings and Loan in Denver.

Subsequently, as thrift institutions began failing, it changed its name to National Thrift and Mortgage News, and then in 1992 to National Mortgage News. In 1995 Faulkner and Gray, which itself was part of the Thomson Corporation, acquired National Mortgage News. Stan Strachan remained publisher until his death in early 1997, at which point Tim Murphy took over as publisher of the paper.

After a reorganization in 2000, the paper became part of Thomson Media, which in turn was sold by its parent company to Investcorp and renamed SourceMedia. Observer Capital acquired the company from Investcorp in August 2014.

SourceMedia is now named Arizent.

The paper's target audience is the US mortgage sector. About three quarters of subscribers are C-level executives.

=== Editorial ===
- Heidi Patalano, Editor in Chief
- Bonnie Sinnock, Capital Markets Editor
- Bradley Finkelstein, Originations Editor
- Maria Volkova, Technology Reporter
- Spencer Lee, Reporter
- Andrew Martinez, Reporter
- Kate Berry, Reporter

=== Sales ===
- Jessica Andreozzi, Sales Manager
