= Arizent =

American business media company

- Parent company: Observer Capital
- Country of origin: United States
- Headquarters location: New York City
- Publication types: Magazines, newspapers, websites
- Revenue: $254.6 million
- No. of employees: 400
- Official website: www.arizent.com

Arizent, formerly known as SourceMedia, is a diversified business-to-business digital media company owned by Observer Capital, which acquired the company from Investcorp in August 2014. Formerly the Thomson Media division of The Thomson Corporation, SourceMedia was spun off and sold by Thomson to Investcorp in 2004 for $350 million.

== Headquarters ==
Based in New York City, SourceMedia has offices in the Washington suburb of Arlington, Virginia and Atlanta.

In 2009, Investcorp split the company into two, creating Accuity as a semi-autonomous unit within SourceMedia. Accuity was the Registrar of Routing Numbers for the American Bankers Association, responsible for the assignment of routing numbers for banks in the United States, and was a leading worldwide provider of payment routing data, software and services. In 2011, Accuity was sold to Reed Elsevier for $530 million.

In February 2012, SourceMedia announced the adoption of a new company logo. The company's "new trademark icon depicts an array of screen-shaped pixels assembled in the shape of a three-dimensional hub."

In September 2012, it was reported that Investcorp would be selling the remainder of SourceMedia. In 2014, SourceMedia was sold to Observer Capital. This is the first major acquisition for Observer Capital, which was founded in 2013 by Joseph Meyer.

== Key brands ==
The company's key brands include American Banker, The Bond Buyer, Mergers & Acquisitions, Financial Planning, On Wall Street, Accounting Today, National Mortgage News, Digital Insurance, Health Data Management, and Employee Benefit News.

American Banker is a leading website and newspaper of record for the banking industry; The Bond Buyer, a website and daily newspaper focused exclusively on the municipal bond industry; as well as National Mortgage News, a website and weekly covering the U.S. mortgage industry; and Mergers & Acquisitions, a monthly magazine providing news, commentary and analysis about corporate mergers and acquisitions.

== Key executives ==
- Jeff Mancini, CEO
- Sean Kron, CFO
- Fell Gray, CMO
- David Evans, chief content officer
- Jeff Mancini, chief strategy officer
- Christian Ward, chief data officer
