= Accuity Inc. =

American financial data company, 2005–2021

- Formerly: BankersAccuity (2011–2013)
- Type: Subsidiary
- Industry: Financial data; regulatory technology
- Predecessor: Thomson Financial Publishing (1989–2005)
- Founded: 2005; 21 years ago
- Fate: Operations merged into LexisNexis Risk Solutions
- Headquarters: Evanston, Illinois, United States
- Key people: Hugh Jones (chief executive officer, 2008–2017); David Wilson (chief executive officer, 2019–2021)
- Products: Bankers Almanac; Firco; payment-routing and compliance software
- Parent: RELX

Accuity Inc. was an American financial-data and regulatory technology company that provided payment-routing information, sanctions and anti-money-laundering screening software, and know-your-customer services. The Accuity name was introduced in 2005, when Thomson Financial Publishing was rebranded following the sale of its parent, Thomson Media, by the Thomson Corporation to Investcorp.

Investcorp subsequently separated Accuity from SourceMedia as a stand-alone business. In 2011, Reed Elsevier acquired the company for £343 million and combined it with Bankers' Almanac under the name BankersAccuity. The combined business returned to the Accuity name in 2013. In 2021, Accuity's operations were merged into LexisNexis Risk Solutions, another RELX business.

== History ==
=== Thomson Financial Publishing ===
Accuity developed from Thomson Financial Publishing, a financial-data and publishing business within the Thomson Corporation. The company published bank directories and electronic reference data used by financial institutions for payment processing, routing-number identification and regulatory compliance.

Its principal publications included the Thomson Bank Directory, which succeeded the Rand McNally Bankers Directory, and the later Thomson/Polk Bank Directory. Thomson Financial Publishing also published the Thomson Regulation CC Directory and was an agent of the American Bankers Association in the administration of United States routing numbers.

In October 2004, Thomson agreed to sell its Thomson Media division to Investcorp for US$350 million. Thomson Financial Publishing subsequently operated under SourceMedia. On September 1, 2005, Thomson Financial Publishing adopted the name Accuity. The company stated that the new name was derived from the words accuracy and quality.

=== Reed Elsevier acquisition and BankersAccuity ===
Hugh Jones was chief executive officer of Accuity from 2008 to 2017, after which he became global managing director of Reed Business Analytics.

In September 2011, Reed Elsevier agreed to acquire Accuity Holdings Inc. from Investcorp for £343 million in cash. At the time, Accuity employed more than 300 people, was based in Skokie, Illinois, and reported more than 14,000 clients. Reed Elsevier described the company's three principal business areas as payment efficiency, risk reduction, and National Regulatory Services.

The acquisition was completed on November 1, 2011. Reed Business Information combined Accuity with its Bankers' Almanac business to create BankersAccuity, headquartered in Skokie and led by Hugh Jones. Bankers' Almanac had originated as a printed banking directory in 1845 and had developed into a financial-institution reference-data service.

In September 2013, BankersAccuity returned to the Accuity brand. Reed Business Information said the name better reflected the combined company's increasing number of non-bank corporate customers.

=== Expansion ===
In September 2014, Reed Elsevier acquired the Paris-based sanctions-screening software company FircoSoft and placed it within Accuity. FircoSoft developed software for screening customers and transactions against sanctions and watch lists.

Accuity moved its global headquarters from Skokie to 1007 Church Street in Evanston, Illinois, in February 2016. Company officials cited access to transportation and potential recruits from Northwestern University as reasons for the relocation.

In July 2018, Accuity acquired Safe Banking Systems, a provider of account-screening, know-your-customer and anti-money-laundering software. David Wilson became managing director and chief executive officer on January 1, 2019, succeeding Hugh Jones in the day-to-day leadership role.

In March 2020, Accuity acquired Apply Financial, a London-based financial-technology company whose software validated bank-account and payment details through cloud and application-programming-interface services.

=== Merger with LexisNexis Risk Solutions ===
On February 17, 2021, Accuity and LexisNexis Risk Solutions announced that they would merge their operations. Both companies were owned by RELX. Accuity became part of the LexisNexis Risk Solutions group, and the combined business brought together payment services, financial-crime compliance, fraud prevention, identity data and analytics. National Regulatory Services, which had been part of Accuity, was subsequently acquired by ComplySci in October 2021.

== Products and services ==
Accuity's products and services were organized around payments data and financial-crime compliance.

=== Payments and banking data ===
The company's payments business supplied bank-routing data, directories, data files and lookup or validation tools used by banks and corporations to process domestic and international payments. Following the 2011 combination, Bankers Almanac became a principal Accuity product line.

The American Bankers Association designated the Bankers Almanac organization as the official registrar of ABA Routing Numbers. That registrar function is now performed by LexisNexis Risk Solutions, which assigns new routing numbers and maintains the routing-transit-number file.

=== Financial-crime compliance ===
Accuity supplied sanctions, anti-money-laundering and know-your-customer data and software. Its Firco product family screened customer and transaction information against sanctions and watch lists, while products derived from Safe Banking Systems supported account screening and risk assessment.

The company also offered counterparty due-diligence services based on Bankers Almanac data. In 2021, shortly before the operational merger with LexisNexis Risk Solutions, Accuity introduced a Bankers Almanac enhanced-due-diligence application that combined financial-institution data with screening and audit-trail functions.
