= Bank note reporter =

US periodical publication of bank notes

An 1849 issue of Thompson's Bank Note Reporter, the most prominent of all bank note reporters. By 1855, it would achieve a circulation of 100,000.

Bank note reporters or counterfeit detectors (Note: Other attested names for the genre include bank detector, bank note detector, and bank note list.) were periodicals published in the United States in the mid-19th century. They were generally used by businesses for two purposes: to identify counterfeit bank notes, and to determine the discount rate for notes from distant banks.

Before the establishment of a uniform paper currency in the United States each of the country's hundreds of banks issued its own distinct notes which led to widespread counterfeiting. Bank note reporters helped merchants and bankers to authenticate notes by providing descriptions of genuine bank notes and up to date information on the latest counterfeit bills being passed around.

While the notes of local banks generally traded at par because they could be readily redeemed at the bank for specie (i.e. silver or gold coins) notes issued by more distant banks traded at a discount. These discounts were proportional to the distance of the bank (and hence the difficulty of redeeming its notes) and were also affected by the perceived reliability or solvency of the bank. Bank note reporters listed these discount rates for the use of merchants who might be offered a variety of notes as payment and for banks and note brokers.

The first bank note reporter was published in 1826. The genre was in decline by 1866 shortly after the end of the free banking era as the multiplicity of state bank notes was replaced by a national paper currency.

== Publication ==
Most reporters were published as periodicals though a few used a newspaper format. They were generally published on a weekly or monthly basis.

The publishers of bank note reporters were generally men who had acquired extensive knowledge of bank notes by working as note brokers or lottery ticket salesmen. Notable examples include Robert T. Bicknell, Sylvester J. Sylvester, Archibald McIntyre, John S. Dye, and John Thompson.

== Audience and circulation ==
The primary audience for bank note detectors were merchants, bankers and note brokers (individuals in the business of trading bank notes, also known colloquially as note shavers). Some popular titles, such as John Thompson's Bank Note and Commercial Reporter claimed as many as 100,000 subscribers. Despite their wide circulation, relatively few issues now survive; old issues were generally immediately discarded, as they were superseded by new ones, and they were rarely saved by libraries.

During the free banking era each major American city had at least one bank note reporter, with some supporting several competing publications. Historian Stephen Mihm puts the total number of titles ever published at at least 72.

== History ==
=== Predecessors ===
Before the existence of dedicated periodicals for the purpose, local newspapers regularly published tables of discount rates for bank notes. The first non-specialized newspaper to do so regularly may have been The American in New York City, which published a feature titled "Bank Note Exchange" twice weekly, beginning July 1819. Newspapers were also an early venue for notices about counterfeit bills.

In 1805, Messrs. Gilbert and Dean published a broadside describing contemporary counterfeit bills, which may have represented the first use of the term counterfeit detector. They followed this in 1806 with the 12-page pamphlet The Only Sure Guide to Bank Bills; or Banks in New-England; with a statement of Bills Counterfeited. It contained descriptions of the notes issued by the 74 banks that then existed in the United States, as well as descriptions of some of the counterfeits in circulation. A month after the pamphlet's publication, the men issued a three page postscript with updates on new counterfeit bills, but published nothing further on the subject after that.

=== Early detectors ===
Bicknell's Counterfeit Detector, the third bank note reporter to be published overall, and the first outside of New York.

The first true counterfeit detector was published by Mahlon Day in New York City. The earliest extant issue of Day's publication is dated August 16, 1830 and titled Day's New-York Bank Note List, Counterfeit Detecter and Price Current. However, it is believed that Day had been publishing such papers since around 1826. (As early as 1823, he had also been publishing annual almanacs which contained very brief information on discount rates and counterfeit identification.)

The second detector to be published, also in New York City, was Sylvester's Reporter, published by Sylvester J. Sylvester beginning around April 1830.

The next, and first to be published outside of New York, was Bicknell's Counterfeit Detector, and Pennsylvania Reporter of Bank Notes, Broken Banks, Stocks, etc., published in Philadelphia by Robert T. Bicknell beginning on July 31, 1830. At the time of its debut, the number of banks in the United States numbered more than 300.

=== Free banking era ===
The most prominent publications emerged in the 1830s, around the beginning of the free banking era (1837–1862), as the number of different bank notes in circulation rapidly increased.

The pre-eminent publication in the field, Thompson's Bank Note Reporter, began publication in 1842.

=== Decline ===
The era of free banking came to a close in 1863 with the passage of the National Bank Act, which established a system of national banks and bills which came to supplant the wide variety of state bank notes previously in use. In 1866, a federal tax of ten percent on state bank notes came into effect, effectively forcing any remaining state banks to convert into national banks or go into liquidation, and rendering bank detectors obsolete.

== Content ==
=== Counterfeit detection ===
John Thompson's Autobiographical Counterfeit Detector consisted of facsimiles of the president and cashier of every bank in the United States.

Because of printing expenses, most publications provided only textual descriptions of bank notes, rather than visual reproductions of notes. One exception was Hodges' Bank Note Safeguard, a bank-note list sold for two dollars which claimed to be "the only work ever published giving correct delineations and fac similie descriptions of all bank notes". Another work, the Autobiographical Counterfeit Detector, printed facsimiles of the current signatures of bank presidents and cashiers. Though intended as tools for counterfeit detection, such facsimiles also proved useful to counterfeiters.

=== Discount rates ===
The notes of local banks generally traded at par, because they could be readily taken to the issuing bank and redeemed in specie. But the notes of distant banks (termed "foreign banks" at the time) traded at a discount. The discount rate for a given bank's notes reflected its perceived risk of default, as well as its distance (which in turn reflected the difficulty of reaching the bank to redeem its notes in specie, as well as the degree of difficulty of authenticating its notes).

Reporters provided exhaustive discount rates for every existing bank in the United States and Canada.

== Fraudulent practices ==
The publishers of bank note reporters were sometimes accused of taking bribes to falsely give a confident rating to a risky or fraudulent bank, a practice known as "puffing". Publishers were also accused of extorting payments from banks, or manipulating exchange rates to enrich themselves.

== See also ==
- Wildcat banking
