= The Bond Buyer =

Newspaper in New York

- Type: Daily newspaper
- Owner: Arizent
- Editor: Michael Scarchilli
- Headquarters: New York City, New York, United States
- ISSN: 0732-0469
- Website: bondbuyer.com

The Bond Buyer is a century-old United States daily national trade newspaper based in New York City and focused on covering the municipal bond industry.

The paper focuses on different regions of the United States each day and maintains news bureaus in Washington, D.C., Chicago, Florida, Atlanta, Dallas and San Francisco.

The news organization maintains a website, which provides breaking-news updates throughout trading days as well as archives and statistics. The website, like the paper, is viewable to paid subscribers.

== Notes ==
- The Milford Wind Corridor Phase I project was named The Bond Buyer's Far West "Deal of the Year" in 2010.
- Lawrence J. Haas won an award from The Bond Buyer for his coverage of the 1985–1986 tax-reform debate in Congress.
