= Anthony Stumpf =

American publisher

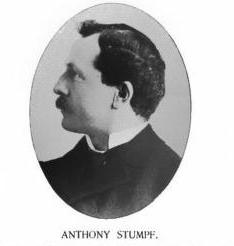
Portrait of financial publisher Anthony Stumpf (1856-1927), published in 1896.

Anthony Stumpf (1856–1927) was an American publisher of financial newspapers and bank directories who co-owned the American Banker newspaper and co-founded The American Lawyer.

Born in Zell, Bavaria, Germany on November 16, 1856, Stumpf immigrated to New York with his family in 1866 and was apprenticed to a shoemaker at age 12. By 14, he had switched to the printing trade and by age 17 he had gone west to work as a type compositor for the St. Louis Post-Dispatch.

Returning to New York “with broadened experience and undiminished ambition,” he became a master printer at Wynkoop & Hallenbeck, where he met Charles David Steurer. In October 1885 at age 28, he joined with Steurer to purchase Thompson’s Bank Note and Commercial Reporter, changing the weekly publication's name to The American Banker and creating a directory of banks, The American Bank Reporter. In addition to overseeing the printing operations of The American Banker, Stumpf became its editor.

The firm of Stumpf and Steurer acquired several publications, including Underwood's Bank Reporter in 1887, Bamberger's Legal Directory in 1889, and the Financial Examiner, also in 1889. In 1892, Stumpf and Steurer founded a legal journal, The American Lawyer, modeled on its success with The American Banker. The two newspapers survive today, but are no longer associated with one another.

In 1905, Stumpf helped to organize North Side Savings Bank, Bronx, N.Y., which operated independently until 1996, when it was acquired by North Fork Bank

Stumpf's bank directory business was eventually sold to R.L. Polk & Co.

Stumpf died on August 17, 1927, and was survived by his widow, five daughters, and two sons.
