= Chase Payment Solutions =

Payment processing company

- Formerly: Chase Paymentech or Chase Merchant Services
- Type: Subsidiary
- Industry: Financial Services; Point-of-Sale Systems; E-commerce; Payment Processing; Payment Services; Mobile Payments
- Founded: 1985; 41 years ago
- Headquarters: Dallas, Texas, United States
- Products: Payment Terminals; Online Payment Gateways; Point-of-Sale Solutions; Mobile Payment Solutions; E-commerce Payment Processing
- Services: Credit card processing; Debit card processing; E-commerce payments/gateway; Payment services provider; Business analytics; Merchant support
- Parent: JPMorgan Chase
- Website: www.chase.com/business/payments (U.S.); www.chase.ca/en (Canada)

Chase Payment Solutions, formerly known as Chase Paymentech and Chase Merchant Services, is an American payment service provider and merchant acquiring business that is part of JPMorgan Chase. Paymentech payment platforms supports businesses to process payments. In addition to its payment services the company provides associated business services such as analytics, payment fraud detection, and data security.

As of 2012, Chase Paymentech processed 29.5 billion transactions with a value of $655.2 billion.

== History ==
In 1985, MNet was set up a merchant acquirer by Mbank. In 1987 Mbank was acquired by Lomas Bank Corp. The company expanded by first acquiring JL McKay, a credit card software provider. The expansions continued with further acquisition of Litle and DMGT in 1995. The brand Paymentech was created in the year 1996 and the Initial public offering (IPO) was executed in the same year. Paymentech acquired Gensar, which later became Paymentech Network Services, Tampa, and Merchant Link in 1996.

In 1997, Chase Paymentech was created as a joint venture between Chase Merchant Services and First Data Corporation (FDC). That year, First USA was acquired by Bank One. In 2001, Paymentech completed the largest retail merchant conversion and launched its Orbital Gateway. Paymentech began its Canadian operations in 2002 through the acquisition of the merchant acquiring portfolios of Scotiabank and Citibank Canada.

Chase Paymentech opened its first European office in Dublin, Ireland in 2004. That year also saw the merger of Bank One and JPMorgan Chase. In 2008, FDC and JPMorgan announced that their Chase Paymentech joint venture was coming to an end, and Chase Paymentech became the merchant services subsidiary of JPMorgan Chase Bank. After the merger with Bank One in 2004, JPMorgan Chase and Paymentech were integrated into Chase Merchant Services.

Chase Mobile Checkout product was launched in May 2013 and allowed businesses to accept credit and debit cards via smartphone with their mobile app and card reader.

In 2022, the company officially rebranded from Chase Paymentech to Chase Payment Solutions to reflect its expanded range of payment offerings.

== Products and services ==
Chase Paymentech provides electronic payment processing products for businesses that accept credit, debit or gift cards from their customers. Their products include services for merchants to reduce payment fraud and manage chargebacks. The company offers products aimed at multiple industries, including e-commerce, retail, professional services, travel and lodging, restaurant, digital content, and government.

The company also provides payment terminals, which allows small businesses to accept most card payment types, as well as the flexibility to accept other forms of customer payments, such as mobile wallets and contactless payment technologies.

== Cyber Holiday Pulse Index ==
Every year, Chase Paymentech releases the Cyber Holiday Pulse Index, an annual measurement of online shopping activity during the holiday season, which tracks e-commerce spending across a sample of 50 leading e-retailers. The Index shows both sales volume and transaction count for online purchases across Chase Paymentech's global processing platforms.
