= History of central banking in the United States =

This history of central banking in the United States encompasses various bank regulations, from early wildcat banking practices through the present Federal Reserve System.

== 1781–1836: Bank of North America and First and Second Bank of the United States ==
=== Bank of North America ===
Some Founding Fathers were strongly opposed to the formation of a national banking system. Russell Lee Norburn said the fundamental cause of the American Revolutionary War was conservative Bank of England policies failing to supply the colonies with money.

Others were strongly in favor of a national bank. Robert Morris, as Superintendent of Finance, helped to open the Bank of North America in 1782, and has been accordingly called by Thomas Goddard "the father of the system of credit and paper circulation in the United States". As ratification in early 1781 of the Articles of Confederation had extended to Congress the sovereign power to generate bills of credit, it passed later that year an ordinance to incorporate a privately subscribed national bank following in the footsteps of the Bank of England. However, it was thwarted in fulfilling its intended role as a nationwide national bank due to objections of "alarming foreign influence and fictitious credit", favoritism to foreigners and unfair policies against less corrupt state banks issuing their own notes, such that Pennsylvania's legislature repealed its charter to operate within the Commonwealth in 1785.

=== First Bank of the United States ===
In 1791, former Morris aide and chief advocate for Northern mercantile interests, Alexander Hamilton, the Secretary of the Treasury, accepted a compromise with the Southern lawmakers to ensure the continuation of Morris's Bank project; in exchange for support by the South for a national bank, Hamilton agreed to ensure sufficient support to have the national or federal capitol moved from its temporary Northern location, New York, to a "Southern" location on the Potomac. As a result, the First Bank of the United States (1791–1811) was chartered by Congress within the year and signed by George Washington soon after. The First Bank of the United States was modeled after the Bank of England and differed in many ways from today's central banks. For example, it was partly owned by foreigners, who shared in its profits. Also, it was not solely responsible for the country's supply of bank notes. It was responsible for only 20% of the currency supply; state banks accounted for the rest. Several founding fathers bitterly opposed the bank. Thomas Jefferson saw it as an engine for speculation, financial manipulation, and corruption. In 1811 its twenty-year charter expired and was not renewed by Congress. Absent the federally chartered bank, the next several years witnessed a proliferation of federally issued Treasury Notes to create credit as the government struggled to finance the War of 1812; a suspension of specie payment by most banks soon followed as well.

=== Second Bank of the United States ===
After five years, the federal government chartered its successor, the Second Bank of the United States (1816–1836). James Madison signed the charter with the intention of stopping runaway inflation that had plagued the country during the five-year interim. It was essentially a copy of the First Bank, with branches across the country. Andrew Jackson, who became president in 1829, denounced the bank as an engine of corruption. His destruction of the bank was a major political issue in the 1830s and shaped the Second Party System, as Democrats in the states opposed banks and Whigs supported them. He was unable to get the bank dissolved, but refused to renew its charter. Jackson attempted to counteract this by executive order requiring all federal land payments to be made in gold or silver, in accordance with his interpretation of The Constitution of the United States, which only gives Congress the power to "coin" money, not emit bills of credit. The Panic of 1837 followed. The bank then flatly denied a subpoena to examine its records and its chief, Nicholas Biddle, bemusedly observed that it would be ironic if he went to prison "By the votes of members of Congress because I would not give up to their enemies their confidential letters". Biddle was eventually arrested and charged with fraud. The bank's charter expired in 1836.

== 1837–1862: "Free banking" era ==
Period	% change in money supply	% change in price level
1832–37	+61	+28
1837–43	−58	−35
1843–48	+102	+9
1848–49	−11	0
1849–54	+109	+32
1854–55	−12	+2
1855–57	+18	+1
1857–58	−23	−16
1858–61	+35	−4

In this period, only state-chartered banks existed. They could issue bank notes against specie (gold and silver coins) and the states heavily regulated their own reserve requirements, interest rates for loans and deposits, the necessary capital ratio etc. These banks had existed since 1781, in parallel with the Banks of the United States. The Michigan Act (1837) allowed the automatic chartering of banks that would fulfill its requirements without special consent of the state legislature. This legislation made creating unstable banks easier by lowering state supervision in states that adopted it. The real value of a bank bill was often lower than its face value, and the issuing bank's financial strength generally determined the size of the discount. By 1797 there were 24 chartered banks in the U.S.; with the beginning of the free banking era (1837) there were 712.

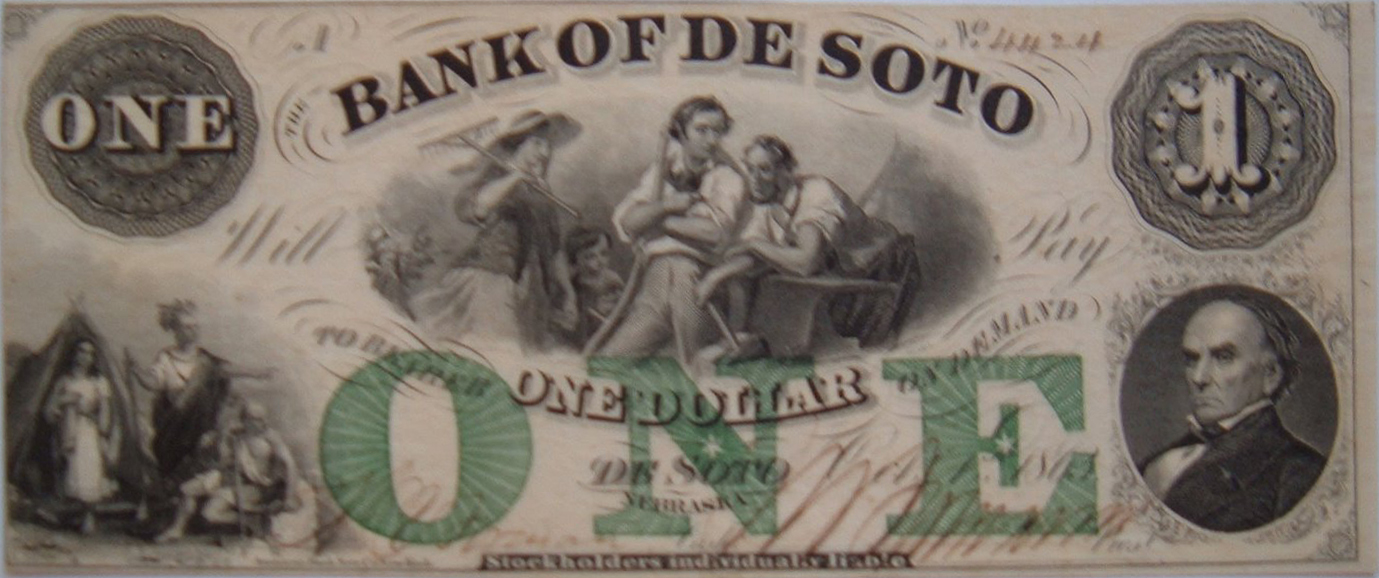
Privately issued note, 1863

During the free banking era, the banks were short-lived compared to today's commercial banks, with an average lifespan of five years. About half of the banks failed, and about a third of which went out of business because they could not redeem their notes. (See also "Wildcat banking".)

During the free banking era, some local banks took over the functions of a central bank. In New York, the New York Safety Fund provided deposit insurance for member banks. In Boston, the Suffolk Bank guaranteed that bank notes would trade at near par value, and acted as a private bank note clearinghouse.

== 1863–1913: National banks ==
The National Banking Act of 1863, besides providing loans in the Civil War effort of the Union, included provisions:

- To create a system of national banks. They were to have higher standards concerning reserves and business practices than state banks. Recent research indicates that state monopoly banks had the lowest long run survival rates. The office of Comptroller of the Currency was created to supervise these banks.
- To create a uniform national currency. To achieve this, all national banks were required to accept each other's currencies at par value. This eliminated the risk of loss in case of bank default. The notes were printed by the Comptroller of the Currency to ensure uniform quality and prevent counterfeiting.
- To finance the war, national banks were required to secure their notes by holding Treasury securities, enlarging the market and raising its liquidity.

As described by Gresham's law, soon bad money from state banks drove out the new, good money; the government imposed a 10% tax on state bank bills, forcing most banks to convert to national banks. By 1865, there were already 1,500 national banks. In 1870, 1,638 national banks stood against only 325 state banks. The tax led in the 1880s and 1890s to the creation and adoption of checking accounts. By the 1890s, 90% of the money supply was in checking accounts. State banking had made a comeback.

Two problems still remained in the banking sector. The first was the requirement to back up the currency with treasuries. When the treasuries fluctuated in value, banks had to recall loans or borrow from other banks or clearinghouses. The second problem was that the system created seasonal liquidity spikes. A rural bank had deposit accounts at a larger bank, that it withdrew from when the need for funds was highest, e.g., in the planting season.

These liquidity crises led to bank runs, causing severe disruptions and depressions. The Panic of 1907 was one of the worst panics in US history. The resulting hearings led to creating a lender of last resort.

National banks issued National Bank Notes as currency. Because they were uniformly backed by US government debt, they generally traded at comparable values in contrast to the notes issued during the Free Banking era in which notes from different banks could have significantly different values. National bank notes were not however "lawful tender", and could not be used as bank reserves under the National Bank Act. The Federal government issued greenbacks which fulfilled this role along with gold.

Congress suspended the gold standard in 1861 early in the Civil War and began issuing paper currency (greenbacks). The federally issued greenbacks were gradually supposed to be eliminated in favor of national bank notes after the Specie Payment Resumption Act of 1875 was passed. However, the elimination of the greenbacks was suspended in 1878 and the notes remained in circulation. Federal debt throughout the period continued to be paid in gold. In 1879, the United States had returned to the gold standard, and all currency could be redeemed in gold.

== 1907–1913: Creation of the Federal Reserve System ==
=== Panic of 1907 alarms bankers ===
Early in 1907, New York Times Annual Financial Review published Paul Warburg's (a partner of Kuhn, Loeb and Co.) first official reform plan, entitled "A Plan for a Modified Central Bank", in which he outlined remedies that he thought might avert panics. Early in 1907, Jacob Schiff, the chief executive officer of Kuhn, Loeb and Co., in a speech to the New York Chamber of Commerce, warned that "unless we have a central bank with adequate control of credit resources, this country is going to undergo the most severe and far reaching money panic in its history." "The Panic of 1907" hit full stride in October. [Herrick]

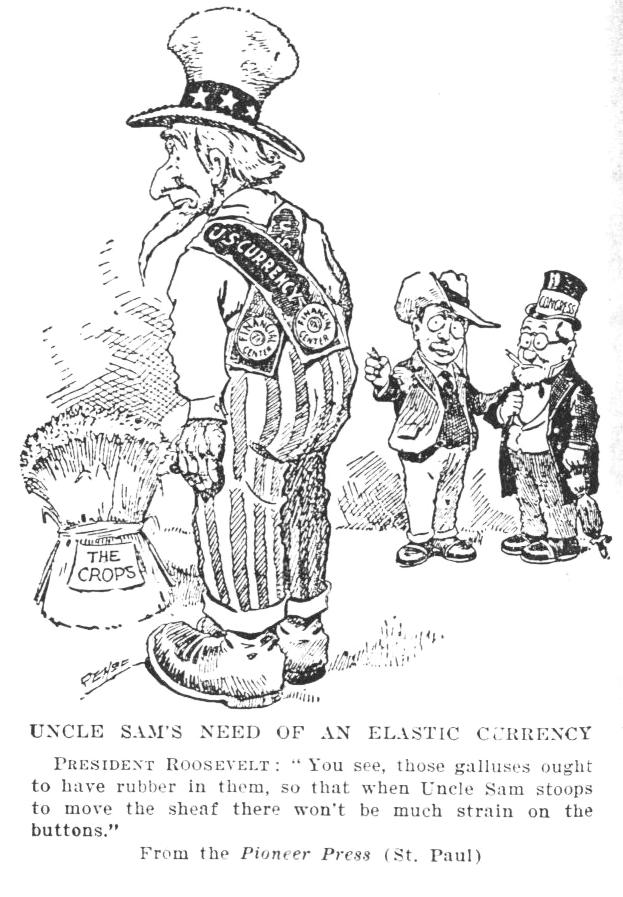
1908 cartoon arguing that an elastic currency is needed

Bankers felt the real problem was that the United States was the last major country without a central bank, which might provide stability and emergency credit in times of financial crisis. While segments of the financial community were worried about the power that had accrued to JP Morgan and other financiers, most were more concerned about the general frailty of a vast, decentralized banking system that could not regulate itself without the extraordinary intervention of one man. Financial leaders who advocated a central bank with an elastic currency after the Panic of 1907 included Frank Vanderlip, Myron T. Herrick, William Barret Ridgely, George E. Roberts, Isaac Newton Seligman and Jacob H. Schiff. They stressed the need for an elastic money supply that could expand or contract as needed. After the scare of 1907 the bankers demanded reform; the next year, Congress established a commission of experts to come up with a nonpartisan solution.

=== Aldrich Plan ===
Rhode Island Senator Nelson Aldrich, the Republican leader in the Senate, ran the Commission personally, with the aid of a team of economists. They went to Europe and were impressed with how the central banks in Britain and Germany appeared to handle the stabilization of the overall economy and the promotion of international trade. Aldrich's investigation led to his plan in 1912 to bring central banking to the United States, with promises of financial stability, expanded international roles, control by impartial experts and no political meddling in finance. Aldrich asserted that a central bank had to be, paradoxically, decentralized somehow, or it would be attacked by local politicians and bankers as had the First and Second Banks of the United States. The Aldrich plan was introduced in the 62nd and 63rd Congresses (1912 and 1913) but never gained much traction as the Democrats in 1912 won control of both the House and the Senate as well as the White House.

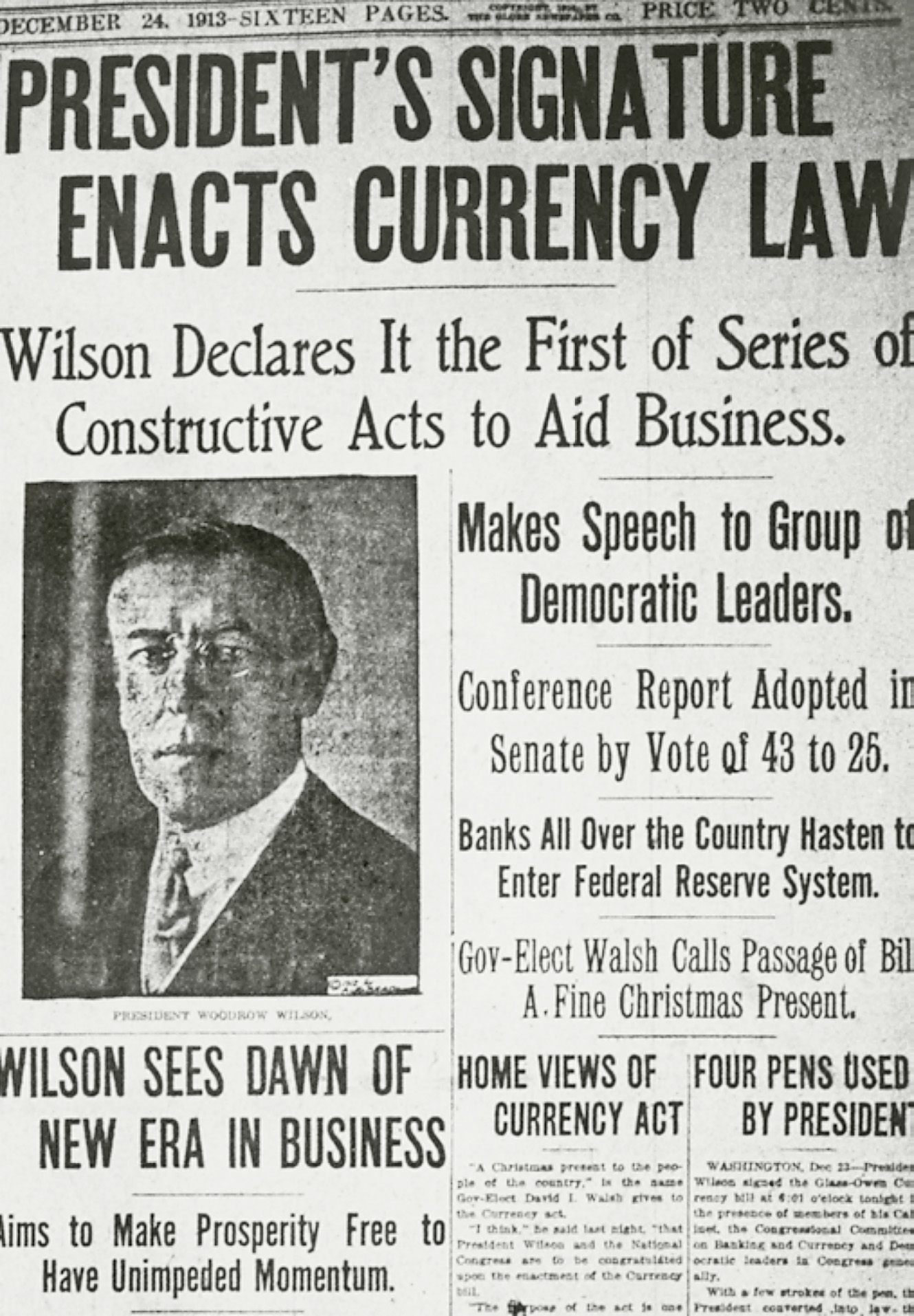
Woodrow Wilson signs bill creating the Federal Reserve System, December 24, 1913

=== A regional Federal Reserve system ===
The new president, Woodrow Wilson, then became the principal mover for banking and currency reform in the 63rd Congress, working with the two chairs of the House and Senate Banking and Currency Committees, Rep. Carter Glass of Virginia and Sen. Robert L. Owen of Oklahoma. It was Wilson who insisted that the regional Federal Reserve banks be controlled by a central Federal Reserve Board appointed by the president with the advice and consent of the U.S. Senate.

=== Agrarian demands partly met ===
William Jennings Bryan, now Secretary of State, long-time enemy of Wall Street and still a power in the Democratic Party, threatened to destroy the bill. Wilson came up with a compromise plan that pleased bankers and Bryan alike. The Bryanites were happy that Federal Reserve currency became liabilities of the government rather than of private banks—a symbolic change—and by provisions for federal loans to farmers. The Bryanite demand to prohibit interlocking directorates did not pass. Wilson convinced the anti-bank Congressmen that because Federal Reserve notes were obligations of the government, the plan fit their demands. Wilson assured southerners and westerners that the system was decentralized into 12 districts, and thus would weaken New York City's Wall Street influence and strengthen the hinterlands. After much debate and many amendments, Congress passed the Federal Reserve Act or Glass–Owen Act, as it was sometimes called at the time, in late 1913. President Wilson signed the Act into law on December 23, 1913.

== Since 1913: The Federal Reserve ==
The Federal Reserve System, also known as the Federal Reserve or simply as the Fed, is the central banking system of the United States today. The Federal Reserve's power developed slowly in part due to an understanding at its creation that it was to function primarily as a reserve, a money-creator of last resort to prevent the downward spiral of withdrawal/withholding of funds which characterizes a monetary panic. At the outbreak of World War I, the Federal Reserve was better positioned than the United States Department of the Treasury to issue war bonds, and so became the primary retailer for war bonds under the direction of the Treasury. After the war, the Federal Reserve, led by Paul Warburg and New York Governor Bank President Benjamin Strong, convinced Congress to modify its powers, giving it the ability to both create money, as the 1913 Act intended, and destroy money, as a central bank could.

During the 1920s, the Federal Reserve experimented with a number of approaches, alternatively creating and then destroying money which, in the eyes of Milton Friedman, helped create the late-1920s stock market bubble and the Great Depression.

After Franklin D. Roosevelt took office in 1933, the Federal Reserve was subordinated to the Executive Branch, where it remained until 1951, when the Federal Reserve and the Treasury department signed an accord granting the Federal Reserve full independence over monetary matters while leaving fiscal matters to the Treasury.

The Federal Reserve's monetary powers did not dramatically change for the rest of the 20th century, but in the 1970s it was specifically charged by Congress to effectively promote "the goals of maximum employment, stable prices, and moderate long-term interest rates" as well as given regulatory responsibility over many consumer credit protection laws.

Since the 2008 financial crisis, central banks globally (including the Federal Reserve) have implemented several experimental Unconventional Monetary Policy Tools (UMPS) in order to achieve their monetary policy objectives.

== See also ==
- Bank of Amsterdam (New Netherland, 1614–1667; Dutch Virgin Islands, 1625–1650)
- Bank of England (Thirteen Colonies, 1694–1776; Rupert's Land, 1694–1811; North-Western Territory, 1694–1870; East Florida and West Florida, 1763–1783; Indian Reserve, 1763–1783; Quebec, 1763–1783; New Ireland, 1779–1783 & 1814–1815; Columbia District, 1810–1846; Red River Colony, 1811–1818; Stickeen Territories, 1862–1863; Colony of British Columbia, 1858–1866; Colony of British Columbia and Vancouver Island, 1866–1871; Province of British Columbia, 1871–1903)
- Banque Générale/Banque Royale (French Louisiana, 1716–1720)
- Bank of Spain (New Spain, 1782–1821; Captaincies General of the Philippines and Puerto Rico, 1821–1898)
- State Bank of the Russian Empire (Russian America, 1860–1867)
- Danmarks Nationalbank (Danish West Indies, 1818–1917)
- Reichsbank (German New Guinea, 1884–1919)

== Bibliography ==
- Bernanke, Ben S. (2015). The Courage to Act: A Memoir of a Crisis and Its Aftermath. New York: W. W. Norton & Company. ISBN 978-0393247213.
- Bremner, Robert (2004). Chairman of the Fed: William McChesney Martin Jr. and the Creation of the American Financial System. New Haven, CT: Yale University Press. ISBN 978-0300105087.
- Broz, J. Lawrence (1997). The International Origins of the Federal Reserve System. Ithaca, New York: Cornell University Press.
- Carosso, Vincent P. (1973). "The Wall Street Trust from Pujo through Medina". Business History Review. 47 (4): 421–437. doi:10.2307/3113365. JSTOR 3113365. S2CID 154895813.
- Federal Reserve Bank of Minneapolis. "A History of Central Banking in the United States". Federal Reserve Bank of Minneapolis. Archived from the original on September 29, 2018.
- Flaherty, Edward. "A Brief History of Central Banking in the United States". Archived from the original on December 13, 2004.
- Friedman, Milton; Schwartz, Anna J. (1963). A Monetary History of the United States, 1867–1960. Princeton University Press. ISBN 978-0691003542.
- Goddard, Thomas H. (1831). History of Banking Institutions of Europe and the United States. Carvill. pp. 48ff.
- Greenspan, Alan (2007). The Age of Turbulence: Adventures in a New World. New York: Penguin Press. ISBN 978-1-59420-131-8. OCLC 122973403.
- Greider, William (1989). Secrets of the Temple: How the Federal Reserve Runs the Country.
- Herrick, Myron T. (January–June 1908). "The Panic of 1907 and Some of Its Lessons". Annals of the American Academy of Political and Social Science. 31.
- Hetzel, Robert L. (2022). The Federal Reserve: A New History. Chicago: University of Chicago Press. doi:10.7208/chicago/9780226821665.001.0001. ISBN 978-0-226-82166-5.
- Kindleberger, Charles P. (2002). Manias, Panics, and Crashes (4th ed.). Basingstoke: Palgrove. ISBN 9780333970294.
- Kolko, Gabriel (1963). Triumph of Conservatism: A Reinterpretation of American History, 1900–1916. pp. 230–254.
- Link, Arthur (1962). Wilson: The New Freedom.
- Livingston, James (1986). Origins of the Federal Reserve System: Money, Class, and Corporate Capitalism, 1890-1913.
- Markham, Jerry (2001). A Financial History of the United States. Armonk: M.E. Sharpe. ISBN 0-7656-0730-1.
- Marrs, Jim (2000). "Secrets of Money and the Federal Reserve System". Rule by Secrecy: The Hidden History that Connects the Trilateral Commission, the Freemasons, and the Great Pyramids. New York: HarperCollins. pp. 64–78.
- Martin, Justin (2000). Greenspan: The Man behind Money. Basic Books. ISBN 978-0738202754. OCLC 45188865.
- Meltzer, Allan H. (2003). A History of the Federal Reserve – Volume 1: 1913–1951. Chicago: University of Chicago Press. ISBN 978-0226520001.
- Meltzer, Allan H. (2009). A History of the Federal Reserve – Volume 2, Book 1: 1951–1969. Chicago: University of Chicago Press. ISBN 978-0226520025.
- Meltzer, Allan H. (2009). A History of the Federal Reserve – Volume 2, Book 2: 1970–1986. Chicago: University of Chicago Press. ISBN 978-0226213514.
- Rothbard, Murray N. (2002). A History of Money and Banking in the United States: The Colonial Era to World War II.
- Sebok, Miklos (2011). "President Wilson and the International Origins of the Federal Reserve System—A Reappraisal". White House Studies. 10 (4): 424–447.
- Shull, Bernard (2005). The Fourth Branch: The Federal Reserve's Unlikely Rise to Power and Influence. Westport, Connecticut: Praeger.
- Silber, William L. (2013). Volcker: The Triumph of Persistence. Bloomsbury Press. ISBN 978-1-620-40292-4.
- Steindl, Frank G. (1995). Monetary Interpretations of the Great Depression.
- Sumner, Scott B. (2021). The Money Illusion: Market Monetarism, the Great Recession, and the Future of Monetary Policy. Chicago: University of Chicago Press. ISBN 978-0226773681.
- Sumner, Scott B. (2015). The Midas Paradox: A New Look at the Great Depression and Economic Instability. Independent Institute. ISBN 978-1-59813-150-5.
- Wells, Donald R. (2004). The Federal Reserve System: A History.
- West, Robert Craig (1977). Banking Reform and the Federal Reserve, 1863-1923.
- Wicker, Elmus R. (1966). "A Reconsideration of Federal Reserve Policy during the 1920-1921 Depression". Journal of Economic History. 26 (2): 223–238. doi:10.1017/S0022050700068674. S2CID 154805899.
- Wells, Wyatt C. (1994). Economist in an Uncertain World: Arthur F. Burns and the Federal Reserve, 1970–1978. New York: Columbia University Press. ISBN 978-0231084963.
- Wood, John H. (2008). A History of Central Banking in Great Britain and the United States. Cambridge University Press. ISBN 978-0521741316.
- Woodward, Bob (2000). Maestro: Greenspan's Fed and the American Boom. Simon & Schuster. ISBN 978-0743205627.
