= United States Post Office (Canandaigua, New York) =

- U.S. Post Office
- U.S. National Register of Historic Places
- U.S. Historic district – Contributing property
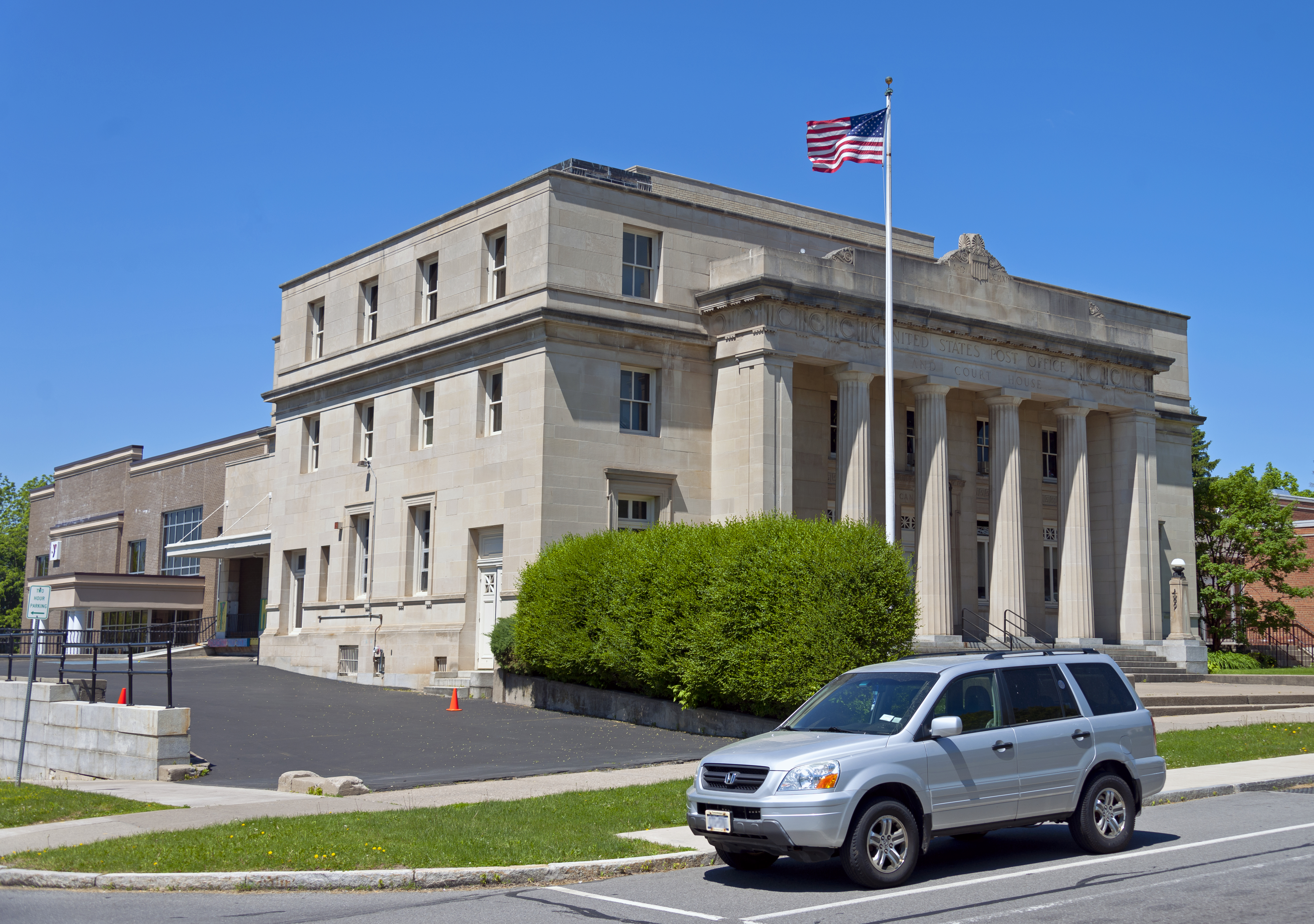
- South profile and east elevation, 2014

- Location within New York Location within the United States
- Location: Canandaigua, NY
- Coordinates: 42°53′18″N 77°16′57″W
- Area: less than one acre
- Built: 1910
- Architect: Allen & Collens (original); Louis Simon (expansion)
- Architectural style: Classical Revival
- Part of: Canandaigua Historic District
- MPS: US Post Offices in New York State, 1858-1943, TR
- NRHP reference No.: 88002465
- Added to NRHP: November 17, 1988

The former U.S. Post Office in Canandaigua, New York, is located on North Main Street (New York state routes 21 and 332). It is a Classical Revival granite structure built in 1910 and expanded in 1938. It was listed on the National Register of Historic Places both as a contributing property to the Canandaigua Historic District in 1984 and individually in 1988, as part of a Multiple Property Submission of over 200 post offices all over the state.

Its construction was authorized in the first decade of the 20th century under the Tarsney Act of 1893, which authorized the federal government to hire private architects to design buildings for its use. Local philanthropist Mary Clark Thompson, widow of banker Frederick Ferris Thompson, donated the land and paid for Boston-based Allen & Collens to design the new building. It is one of only three post offices in the state built under the act, and the only one outside of New York City. In 1938 it was expanded with an additional story under the auspices of Louis Simon, Supervising Architect of the Treasury Department.

At the time of its construction it was also used as a federal courthouse. Three years after it was listed on the Register, the Postal Service moved out for larger quarters. The neighboring YMCA bought the post office building several years later. It has annexed it to its own building and built an extension to the west, but kept the post office building intact.

== Building ==
The former post office building is located in the center of Canandaigua, on the west side of North Main between Atwater Place and Greig Terrace, on the corner with the former. To the south is Atwater Park. Canandaigua's city hall, also a contributing property to the historic district, is opposite the park on the south, across West Street. Beyond it are the railroad tracks, actively used by CSX Transportation for freight service, that traverse the city.

On the north is the building now occupied by the local YMCA, separate from the post office building at the time of construction but now annexed to it. Across North Main, a four-line road with a narrow planted median strip at this point, is the Ontario County courthouse, also a contributing property. Behind the post office is a parking lot, beyond which the railroad tracks curve, following the contour of the terrain, which gently slopes southward toward the north end of Canandaigua Lake.

The building itself is a three-story granite structure on a raised basement with a rear addition. A driveway is set on the south side between the building and a sympathetic stone retaining wall. In the front is a flagpole and a short walk, with a line of large shrubs setting off the driveway on the south.

Its east (front) facade has a projecting central portico. Four round fluted Doric columns flanked by in antis Doric piers supporting a Doric entablature in which "United States Post Office And Courthouse" is engraved in the architrave. It is the center of a frieze with metopes ornamented with round panels. Above it is a dentilled cornice topped by an attic. At the top of the entire portico is an anthemion set between the engraved words "A.D. MCMXI" and capped with volutes on the end. A small brick section rises up from the center of the flat roof.

Climbing up to the portico is a full-width set of six stone steps. On either side are pedestals with pedimented pylons supporting cast iron anthemia-shaped lamps with glass globes. They are set with a cast iron caduceus. On either side is a single bay with a two-over-two double-hung sash window topped by a two-light transom in a recessed surround on the first story, where a water table forms their sills, and a smaller two-over-two with no surround on the upper story. The attic has two similar windows flanking the anthemion.

Behind the portico colonnade is the main entrance, set within a battened, crosetted enframement with "Canadaigua" carved into the top. Above the modern entrance doors is a transom with a classically inspired grille. It is illuminated by a large metal lamp that hangs by a chain from the ceiling. On either side are two double casement windows topped by a three-pane transom with a similar grille. Above them are spandrels carved with a Greek key pattern separating the two stories. The second story has simpler two-over-two double-hung sash similar to those outside the portico.

On the south facade, the only other original one remaining exposed, the fenestration retains many of the same treatments, but with deeper recessing. A secondary entrance near the east corner has two paneled wooden doors with a crosetted upper light and blind transom. To its west, two barred windows open into the basement as the driveway rises toward the former loading dock at the end of the block. The water table continues, supported by brackets at the base of the two largest first-story windows, set with narrow four-light casement in the same surrounds as their counterparts on the east. A single narrow casement window is to the west, followed by a dropped single-pane transomed casement window.

The second story on the south side has one-over-one double-hung sash with no surrounds, likewise set deeper than the east windows. Above it the cornice continues as well. In the rear the former loading dock entrance, now barred off, is on a small extension. A brown brick extension with some architecturally sympathetic elements continues further west; it was built by the YMCA after the Postal Service discontinued use of the building and is not part of the NRHP listing.

The entrance doors open into a wooden vestibule with Doric pilasters. Five more, this time of white marble, divide the main lobby beyond it into five bays. The walls are of the same stone, with light and dark green marble used for the baseboards and sills; it has a terrazzo floor, also with marble trim. The screenline, between the pilasters, has oak frames and classical grilles. At the top of the pilasters is a plaster Doric entablature and crossbeams with a Greek key design similar to that seen on the east facade.

A stairway and elevator lead upstairs. To the west of the lobby is a large work area. At the west of the building, in the loading-dock addition, is the former courtroom. It, too, has Doric pilasters, crosetted windows with grilles and stylized fretwork on its metal vents.

== History ==
Canandaigua was established as a European-American settlement in the last years of the 18th century, as a base for the settlement of the rest of Western New York. As it was roughly on the same corridor and transportation routes of the many other communities that had been established between Utica and Buffalo, it was established as the county seat as soon as Ontario County was created.

Mail delivery began in 1794. Canandaigua continued to grow and railroads made the city a stop as soon as tracks could be built there. In 1860 the federal government negotiated a lease with the county that allowed it to operate a post office in perpetuity in a corner of the county courthouse.

By the later decades of the 19th century its location at the north end of Canandaigua Lake made the city a popular destination for summer residents. In 1886 two arrived who would leave a major mark on the city, including the current post office building. New York City banker Frederick Ferris Thompson and his wife, Mary Clark Thompson, a native of Canandaigua whose father had served as governor, built Sonnenberg Gardens, also listed on the Register and designated a state historic site, as their summer home. They commissioned Boston architect Francis B. Allen to design the house.

The Thompsons became very committed to Canandaigua, funding the planting of trees along its streets and founding the hospital building later used as county offices. In 1906, with the post office outgrowing its space in the courthouse, Congress authorized a post office building for the city, although no site was available. Four years later Mary Thompson, now widowed, bought the current site and donated it to the federal government.

Normally, at that time, post office buildings, like all other federal government buildings, had been designed by the Office of the Supervising Architect at the Treasury Department. But the Tarsney Act of 1893 allowed a limited number of commissions, such as the 1900 Ellis Island Immigrant Inspection Center, to be awarded to private architects. Mary Thompson paid for Allen's new firm of Allen & Collens, best known for the Union Theological Seminary building on Manhattan's Upper West Side, to design the new Canandaigua post office. It was one of only three post offices in the state designed privately under the Act, and the only one outside of New York City.

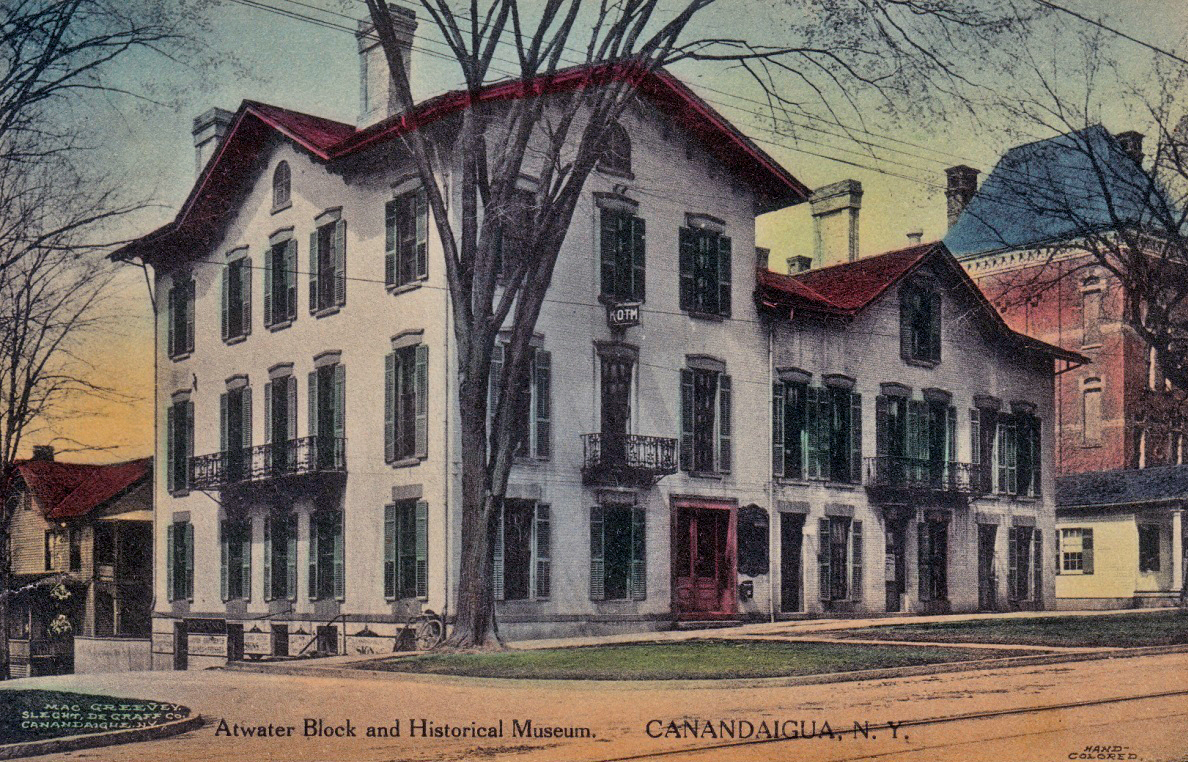
The Atwater Block, demolished to make way for the post office

The post office moved into temporary offices at the YMCA while it awaited the construction of its new home. First the Atwater Block, the existing 1850 building on the site that had served mainly as lawyers' offices and, briefly, the first office of the Ontario County Historical Society, was demolished. Construction began on the new post office in 1910; it was completed and opened two years later.

Allen produced a building less restrained than his other ventures into the Classical Revival mode, which often used simple engaged pilasters on their front facades rather than the full colonnaded portico he employed in Canandaigua. Behind the portico, the window design is meant to reflect the Erechtheum on the Acropolis in Athens. While the building is quite monumental for a small city in upstate New York, its front entrance and lobby are more modestly scaled than that monumentality would suggest.

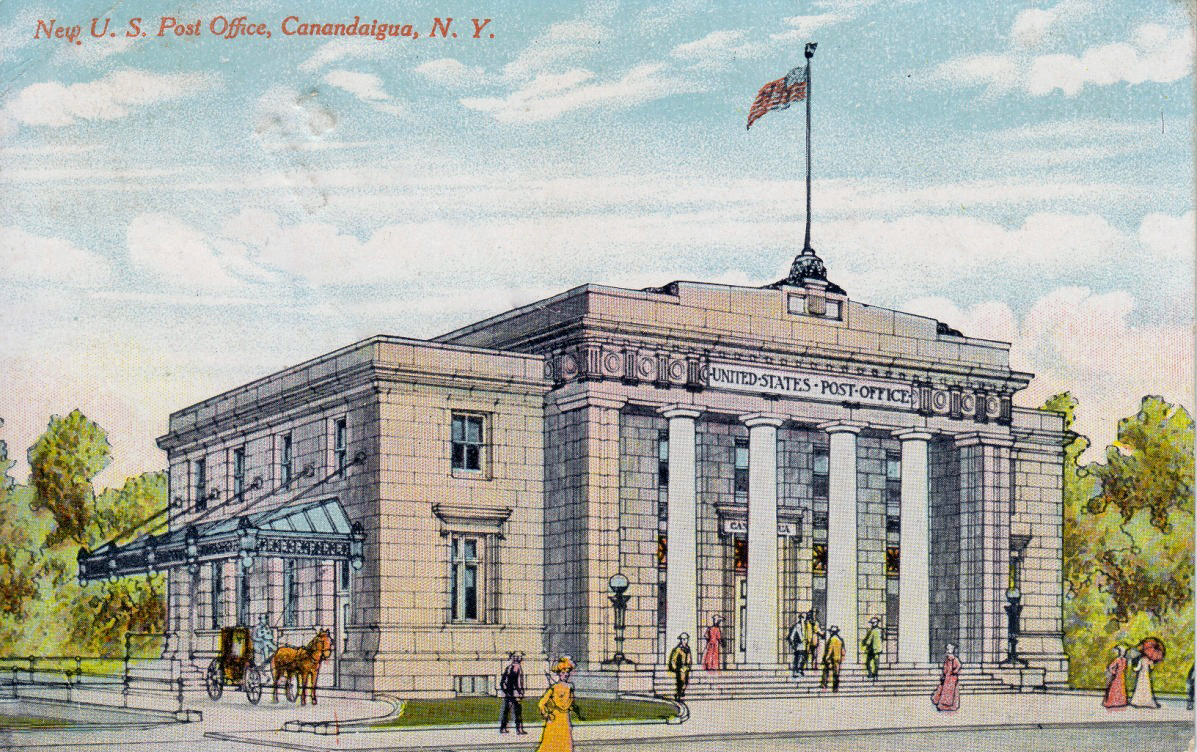
Rendering showing building's original appearance

At the time of its completion the building was two stories tall, with a parapet on the edge of its flat roof. In 1938, under the direction of Louis Simon, Supervising Architect of the Treasury, the building was expanded to allow sessions of the United States District Court for the Western District of New York to be held in the city, as authorized by the law that had created the district in 1900. A third story was built on the roof inside the parapet, and a small two-bay extension was added to the west (rear) elevation. Inside, a staircase was extended and elevator added to reach the new floor.

Over the years, the post office would fulfill other federal government functions as well besides occasional court sessions. Local draft boards met here during all the major wars and military conflicts the U.S. was involved in during the 20th century. In 1991 the Postal Service, having outgrown the building again, moved to a new facility on the eastern edge of the city, off routes 5 and 20.

The building then sat vacant for three years. In 1994 the YMCA, where the post office had briefly been quartered during the building's construction eight decades earlier, bought the building for an expansion. In the process it added the rear extension and joined its building next door to the post office.

== See also ==
- National Register of Historic Places listings in Ontario County, New York
