= Stanton Davis Kirkham =

Stanton Davis Kirkham (December 7, 1868 – January 6, 1944) was a naturalist, philosopher, ornithologist and author. Although widely travelled, he resided primarily in Canandaigua, Ontario County, New York. He was born in Nice, Alpes-Maritimes, France, the only child of Major Murray S. Davis (Commander, 8th Cavalry, Troop A, Camp Winfield Scott, Nevada, 1867) and Julia Edith Kirkham Davis, daughter of Gen. Ralph Wilson Kirkham, Union Army general, who adopted Kirkham and brought him to the United States. He was named after Secretary of War Edwin M. Stanton, whom his father had served as an aide. He attended public schools in California and later graduated from the Massachusetts Institute of Technology.

== Biography ==
Kirkham was the author of As Nature Whispers (1902), The Ministry of Beauty (1907), Where Dwells the Soul Serene (1907), In The Open: Intimate Studies and Appreciations of Nature (1908), The Philosophy of Self-Help: An Application of Practical Psychology to Daily Life, (1909), Mexican Trails: A Record of Travel in Mexico, 1904-7, and a Glimpse at the Life of the Mexican Indian (1909), Resources: An Interpretation of the Well-Rounded Life (1910), East and West: Comparative Studies of Nature in Eastern and Western States (1911), Outdoor Philosophy: The Meditations of a Naturalist (1912), North and South: Notes on the Natural History of a Summer Camp and a Winter Home (1913), Half-True Stories: For Little Folks of Just the Right Age (1916), After Thirty Years (1923), Animal Nature and Other Stories (1926), Cruising Around the World and the Seven Seas (1927) and Shut-In (1936).

He married Mary Clark Williams (1869 - 1911), granddaughter of New York Governor Myron H. Clark, on May 16, 1907. They had two children, a son, Paul Kirkham, and a daughter, Mary Clark Kirkham (1908-2000). He was quoted in Chapter 6 of As a Man Thinketh by James Allen. He died in New York City at the age of 75. An illness he contracted during a horseback journey across South America in 1914 rendered him an invalid for the latter part of his life. His philosophy, as stated in The Ministry of Beauty and other works, could be said to fall within the category of Transcendentalism. He is buried in Woodlawn Cemetery, Canandaigua, New York.

== See also ==
- American philosophy
- List of American philosophers
