= John Bunyan (disambiguation) =

John Bunyan (1628–1688) was an English writer and preacher.

John Bunyan may also refer to:

- John Bunyan (American football) (1905–1989)
- John Bunyan (sportsperson), dual player from County Kerry
- John Bunyan Bristol (1826–1909), an American landscape painter
- John Bunyan Reeve (1831–1916), an American minister and professor at Howard University
- John Bunyan Shearer, (1832–1919), president of Davidson College
- John Bunyan Slaughter (1848–1928), an American rancher and banker
