= Ontario County Courthouse =

Historic courthouse in Canandaigua, New York

- U.S. National Register of Historic Places
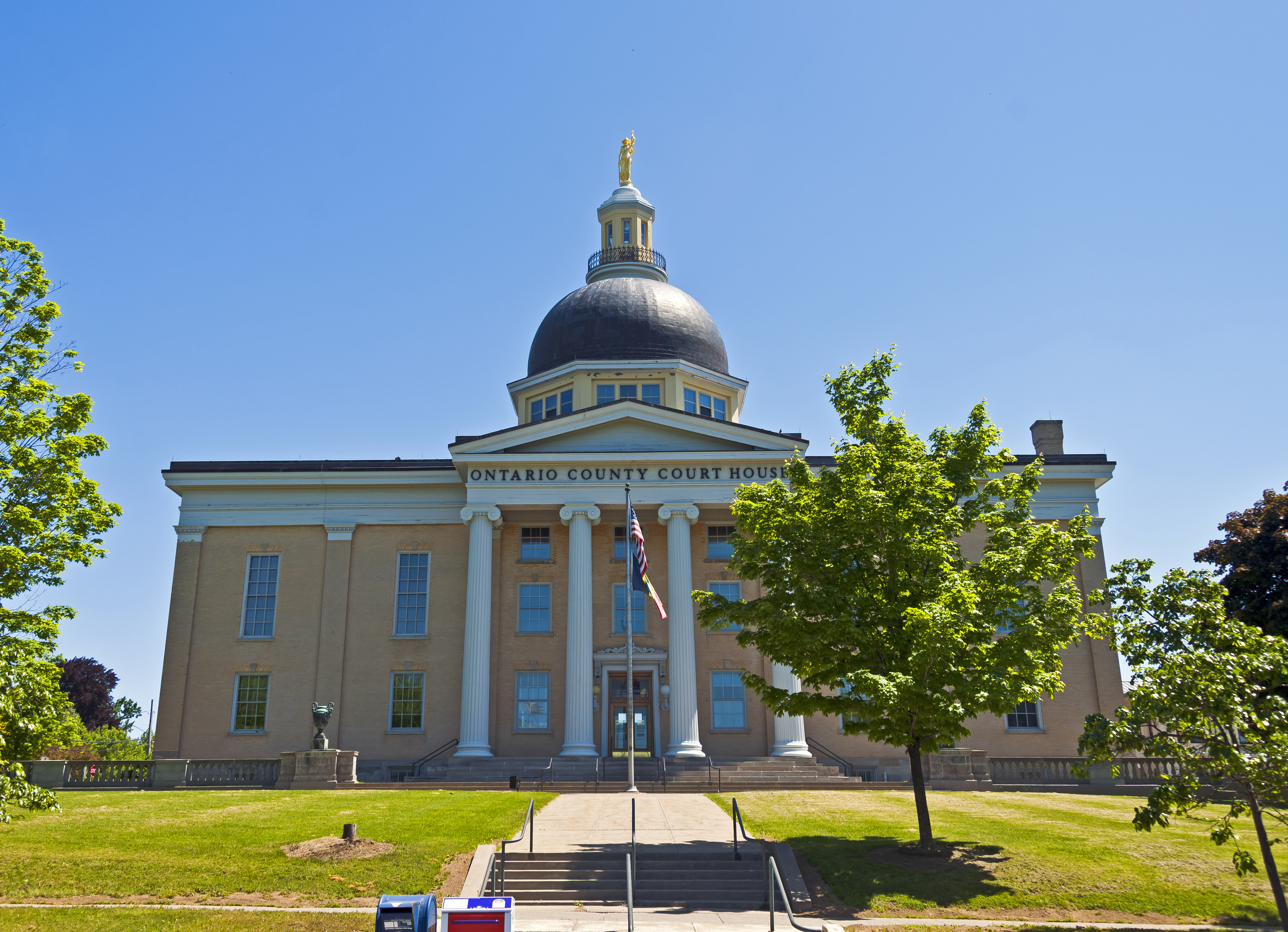
- Ontario County Courthouse in 2014

- Location within New York Location within the United States
- Interactive map showing the location of Ontario County Courthouse
- Location: 27 N Main Street Canandaigua, New York
- Coordinates: 42°53′18.9″N 77°16′52.5″W
- Built: 1858
- NRHP reference No.: 84002856 (original); 16000345 (increase)
- Added to NRHP: 1984

The Ontario County Courthouse is located in Canandaigua, New York, United States. The United States v. Susan B. Anthony trial took place in this courthouse in 1873. It is a contributing property to the Canandaigua Historic District, listed on the National Register of Historic Places in 1984.
