= Sonnenberg Gardens =

Historic house in New York, United States

- U.S. National Register of Historic Places
- U.S. Historic district
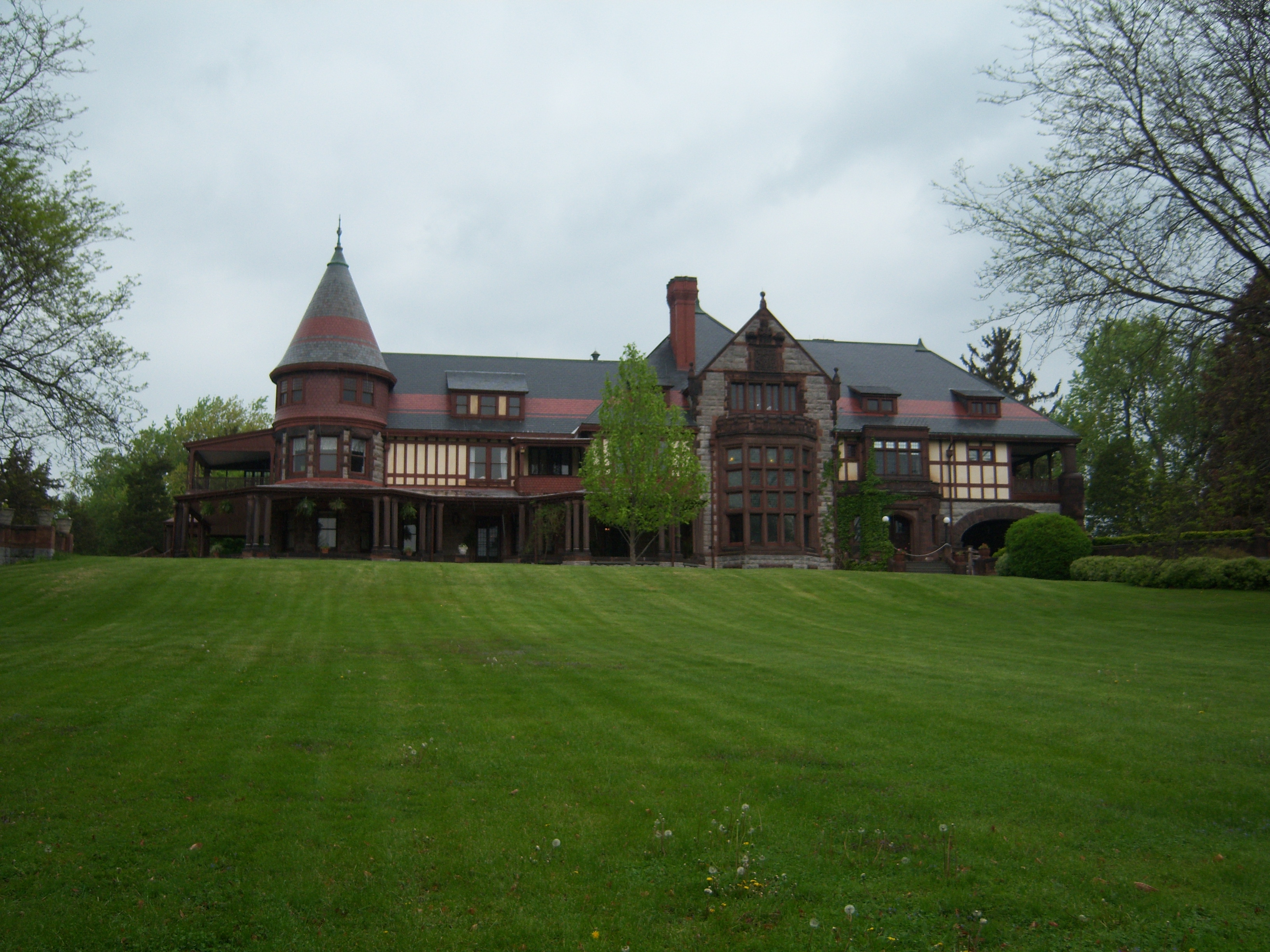
- Sonnenberg Mansion

- Location within New York Location within the United States
- Location: 250 Gibson Street., Canandaigua, New York
- Coordinates: 42°54′0″N 77°16′21″W
- Built: 1887
- Architect: Bowditch, Ernest; John Handrahan.
- Architectural style: Queen Anne
- NRHP reference No.: 73001240
- Added to NRHP: September 28, 1973

Sonnenberg Gardens and Mansion State Historic Park is a 50-acre (20 ha) state park located at 151 Charlotte Street in Canandaigua, New York, at the north end of Canandaigua Lake, in the Finger Lakes region of Upstate New York. The house and gardens are open to the public every day, May through October.

== History ==
The property was once the summer home of Frederick Ferris Thompson, a prominent banker in New York City, and his wife Mary Clark Thompson, whose father, Myron Holley Clark, was Governor of New York State in 1855. The Clark family was from Canandaigua. Mr. & Mrs. Thompson's main home was in NYC in a large townhouse on Madison Avenue. The Thompsons purchased the Sonnenberg property in 1863, keeping the name, Sonnenberg (which means "sunny hill" in German). In 1887, they replaced the original farmhouse with a forty-room Queen Anne style mansion. The property also had a 100-acre (40 ha) farm to the east. Sonnenberg's gardens were designed and built between 1902 and 1919, and originally consisted of nine gardens in a variety of styles.

The Thompsons had no children. The nephew who inherited the estate after Mary Clark Thompson's death in 1923 sold the property to the Federal Government in 1931, who built a veteran's hospital (today the Canandaigua VA Medical Center) on the adjacent farmland. The government used the mansion to house doctor's families and some nurses. In 1972, by an act of Congress called the Sonnenberg Bill, the mansion and its grounds were transferred from the Federal Government to a local non-profit organization formed to restore and reopen the property. It was opened to the public in 1973. All nine gardens have been restored and visitors can tour the mansion. In 2005, the New York State Office of Parks, Recreation and Historic Preservation bought the estate. It is still operated by the non-profit.

== Gardens ==
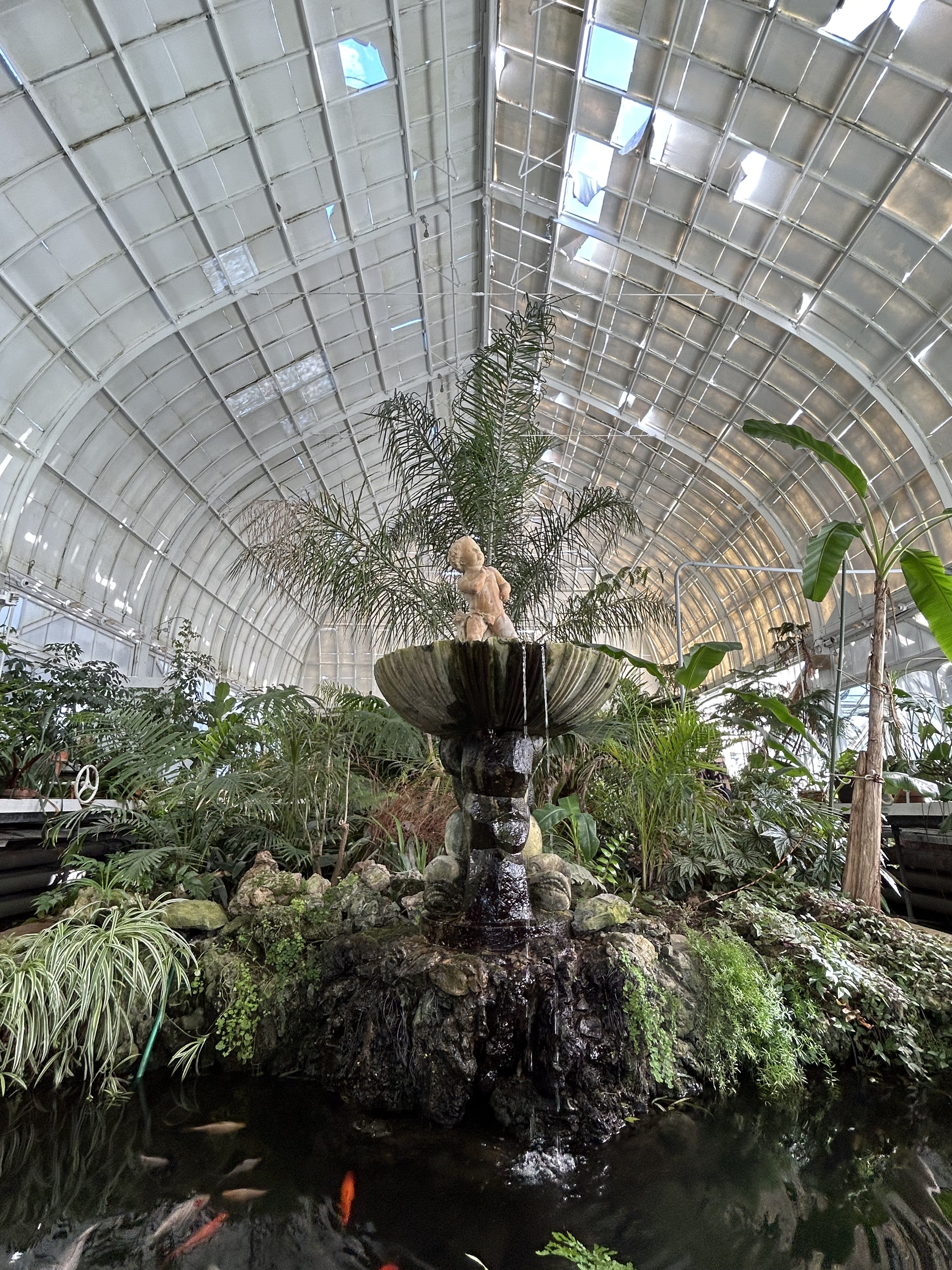
Conservatory at the Sonnenberg Gardens

Today most of the gardens have been restored, as follows:

- The Conservatory – A Lord & Burnham conservatory complex, built between 1903 and 1915, and considered one of the most important residential greenhouse complexes in the United States. The complex includes a domed Palm House, with other glass houses featuring orchids, cacti, and tropical plants.
- Japanese Garden – A miniature mountainous Japanese landscape, with torii gate. It is said that its tea house was modeled upon a very old tea house in Kyoto, since destroyed by fire. In addition, there is a statue of Buddha.
- Sub Rosa Garden – A green garden (having no flowers) with white marble fountain complex set off by green lawn, boxwood, and evergreens. The fountain is Zeus, with Artemis and Apollo.
- Rose Garden – A belvedere with over 2,500 rose bushes. The main beds are red, white, and pink; other beds are more varied in color.
- Italian Garden – Four sunken parterres in a fleur-de-lis pattern, bordered by yews, with about 20,000 annuals in the bedding.
- Blue & White Garden – Blue and white flowers with a Zelkova japonica tree in the center.
- Pansy Garden – Planted with pansies with a delightful pedestal fountain as the centerpiece.
- Moonlight Garden – Only white flowers, blooming late afternoon, and many fragrant. Includes heliotrope, tuberoses and verbenas.
- Old-Fashioned Garden – A geometric garden, in which a low boxwood hedge forms the quincunx pattern of five circles. Four quarter sections, each with a center circle, are filled with annuals and perennials surrounded with diagonal intersecting walks, and an arbor in the center bisects the fifth circle.
- Rock Garden – Formerly three gardens (the Wild Garden, the Lily Garden, and the Rock Garden), completed in 1919, but now merged to form an informal, wooded garden. Its path winds through a canyon constructed of puddingstone, with natural pockets and crannies used for alpine plants. Water includes 500 feet (150 m) of streams, waterfalls, and pools fed by geysers and springs.
- Grounds were planted with many specimen trees (some planted by important guests), now numbering over 140 varieties.

== Architecture ==
Built between 1885 and 1887, the 40-room Queen Anne style Sonnenberg mansion was designed by Francis R. Allen, a noted Boston architect. Allen also designed and oversaw the remodeling of the mansion approximately 15 years after it was constructed. Two of the three floors are furnished and open to the public.

The mansion's facade is rusticated graystone with Medina sandstone trim and gables made from timber and stucco. The roof is slate with lead-coated copper.

The Thompsons had a Roman bath constructed in 1914 to act as a swimming area. The bathhouse and pool were designed by Allen in the neoclassical revival style. The bathhouse includes a wrapped around porch shelter covered with Ludowici clay roof tiles.

== Other attractions ==
In addition to the nine gardens and mansion, the property hosts the Finger Lakes Wine Center, which is housed in the Bay House and offers a number of local wines for tasting and purchase, as well a fine gift shop.

A cafe is located in the Gardener's House serving light lunches.

== See also ==
- List of botanical gardens in the United States
- List of New York State Historic Sites
- National Register of Historic Places listings in Ontario County, New York
