= Woodlawn Cemetery (Canandaigua, New York) =

Historic cemetery in New York, United States

- U.S. National Register of Historic Places
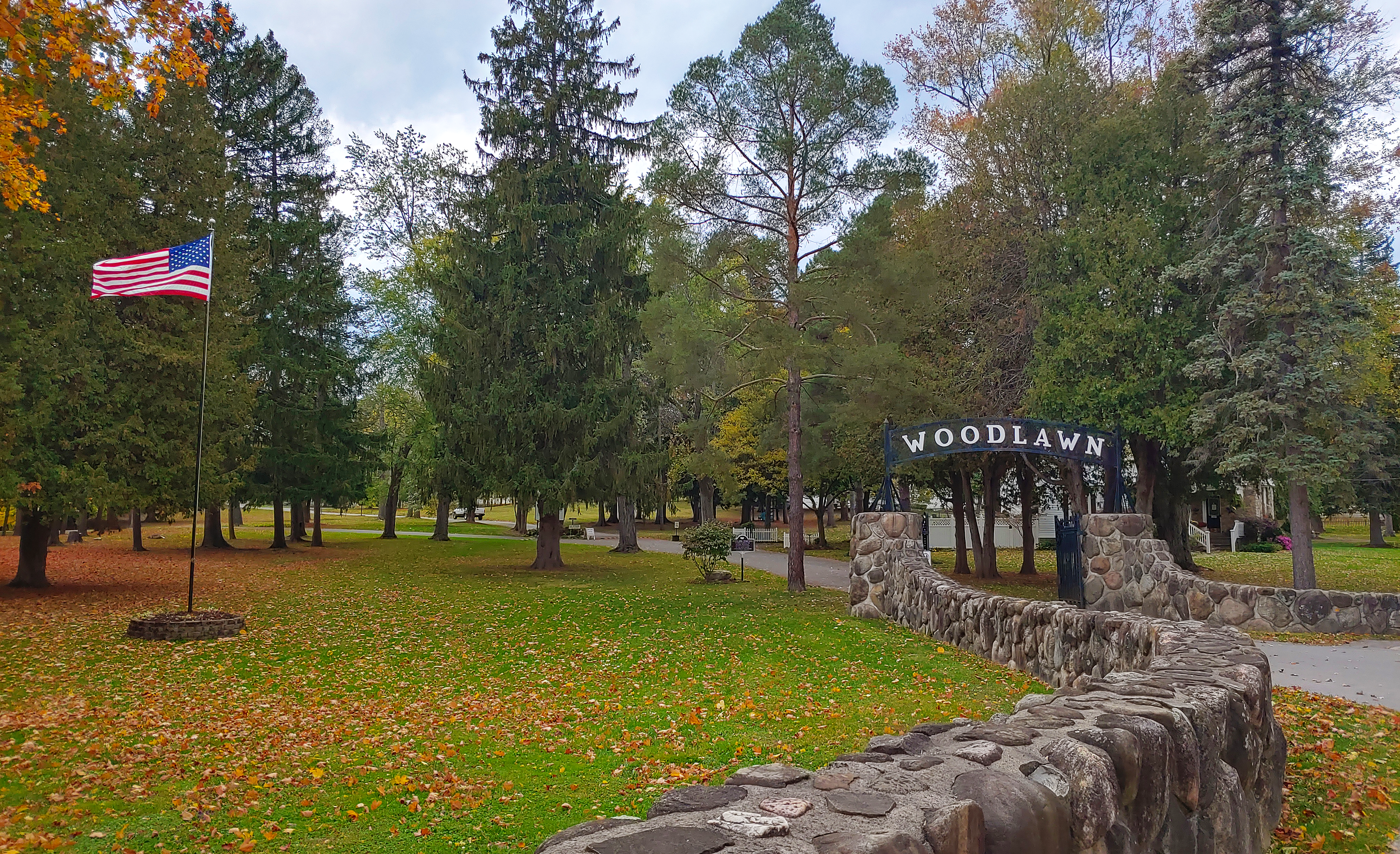

- Location within New York Location within the United States
- Location: 130 N. Pearl St, Canandaigua, New York
- Coordinates: 42°53′18″N 77°17′56″W
- Area: 64.4 acres (26.1 ha)
- NRHP reference No.: 14000914
- Added to NRHP: November 12, 2014

Woodlawn Cemetery is a historic cemetery located at Canandaigua, Ontario County, New York, United States.

In June 1884, officers and trustees were elected and the original 28 acres (110,000 m^{2}) of land were purchased from Lucius Wilcox. Over the years, people left adjacent land to the cemetery which now totals 64.4 acres (261,000 m^{2}) in the city and 7 acres (28,000 m^{2}) in the town of Canandaigua and serves as a burial site for more than 13,000 people.

The Woodlawn Cemetery chapel was dedicated in 1910. In 2014 it was listed on the National Register of Historic Places.

== Notable burials ==
- Myron Holley Clark (1806–1892) – Governor of New York
- Crystal Eastman (1881–1928) – feminist, socialist, antimilitarist, lawyer, journalist, and worker safety pioneer. Co-founder of the American Civil Liberties Union
- Francis Granger (1792–1868) – Member of the U.S. House of Representatives and U.S. Postmaster General; candidate for U.S. Vice President (1836)
- Gideon Granger (1767–1822) – New York State Senator and U.S. Postmaster General
- Barney Kessel (1923–2004) – legendary Jazz Guitarist
- Stanton Davis Kirkham (1868–1944) – author
- Elbridge Gerry Lapham (1814–1890) – Member of the U.S. House of Representatives and United States Senate
- John Raines (1840–1909) – New York State Senator and member of the U.S. House of Representatives
- Frederick Ferris Thompson (1836–1899) – notable banker, co-founder of predecessor banks to Citibank and JP Morgan Chase
- Mary Clark Thompson (1835–1923) – philanthropist
- Edward Francis Winslow (1837–1914) – a Civil War general, who died at Sonnenberg while visiting Mary Clark Thompson and her banker husband, Frederick Ferris Thompson

== See also ==
- List of cemeteries in New York
- National Register of Historic Places listings in Ontario County, New York
