= North Main Street Historic District (Canandaigua, New York) =

Historic district in New York, United States

- U.S. National Register of Historic Places
- U.S. Historic district
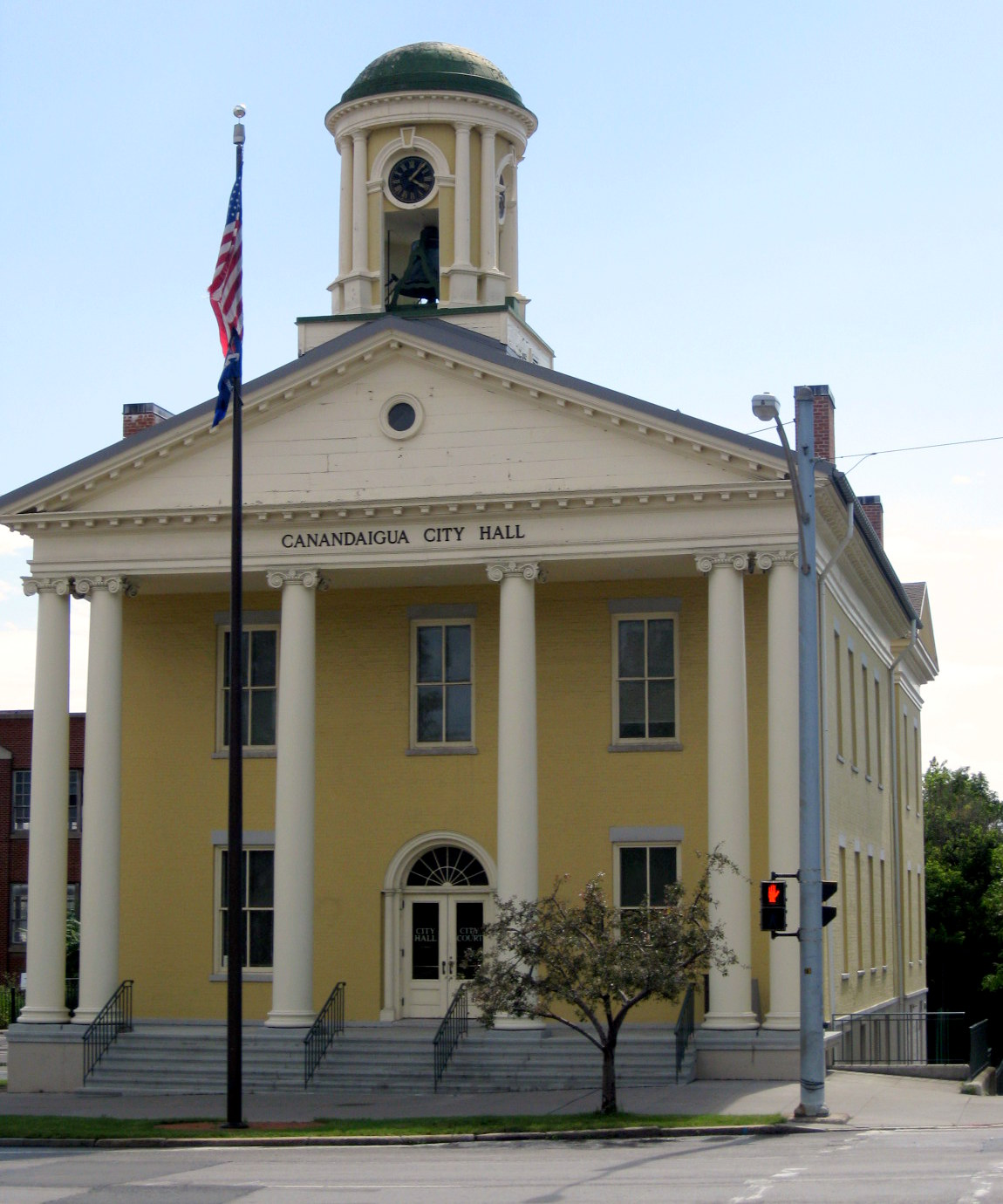
- Canandaigua City Hall (1812), July 2009

- Location within New York Location within the United States
- Location: Between RR tracks and Buffalo-Chapel St., Canandaigua, New York
- Coordinates: 42°53′35″N 77°17′8″W
- Built: 1800
- Architectural style: Greek Revival, Late Victorian, Federal
- NRHP reference No.: 73001239
- Added to NRHP: July 20, 1973

North Main Street Historic District in Canandaigua, New York is a historic district that was listed on the NRHP in 1973.

Significant buildings are the First Congregational Church, the 1812 built courthouse which was city hall by 1972, and a dozen Federal and Greek Revival architecture houses.

The First Congregational Church in the district was covered in a HABS survey. In 1984, it was incorporated into the Canandaigua Historic District.

== Gallery ==
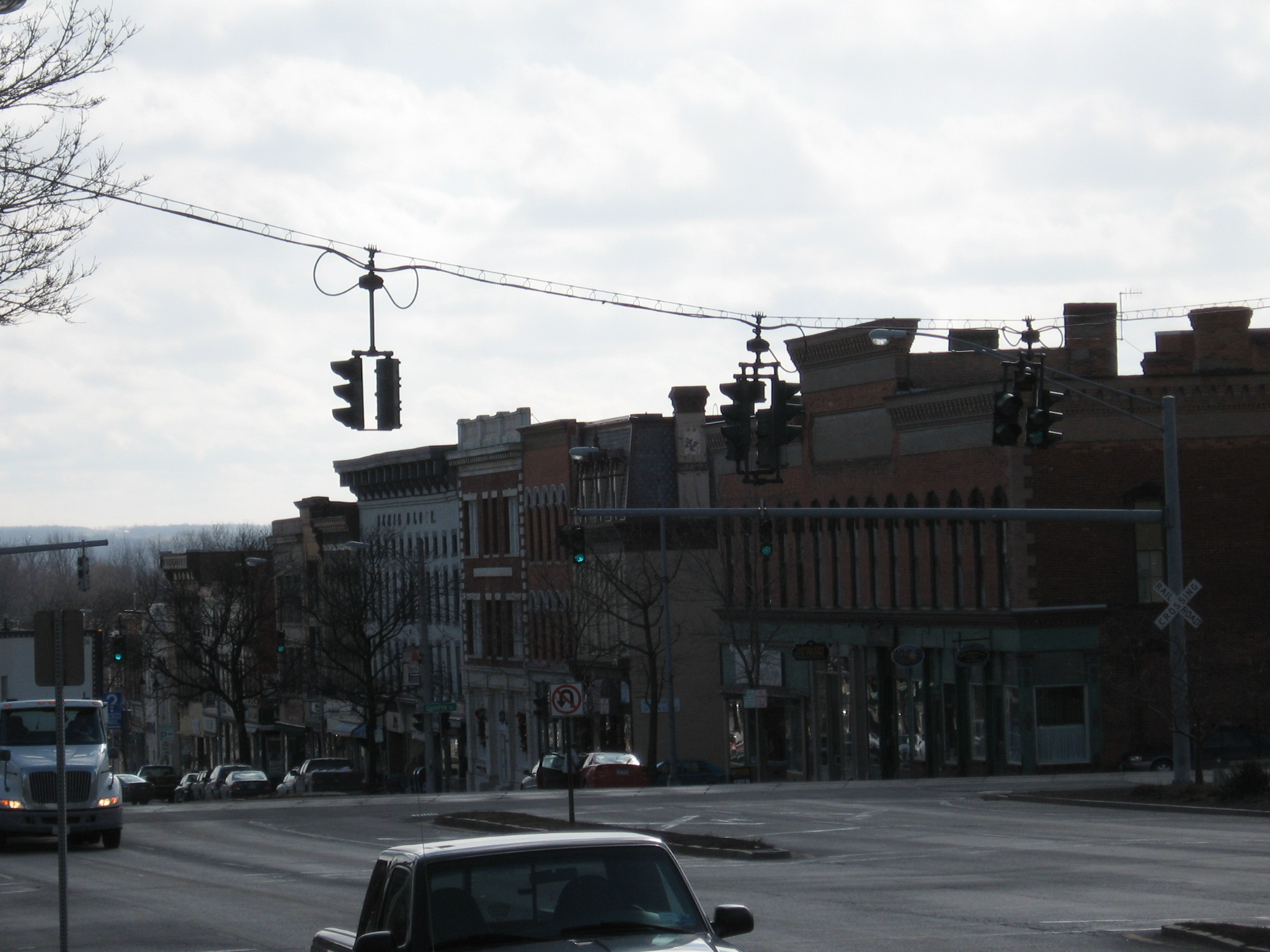
Main Street, Canandaigua, NY

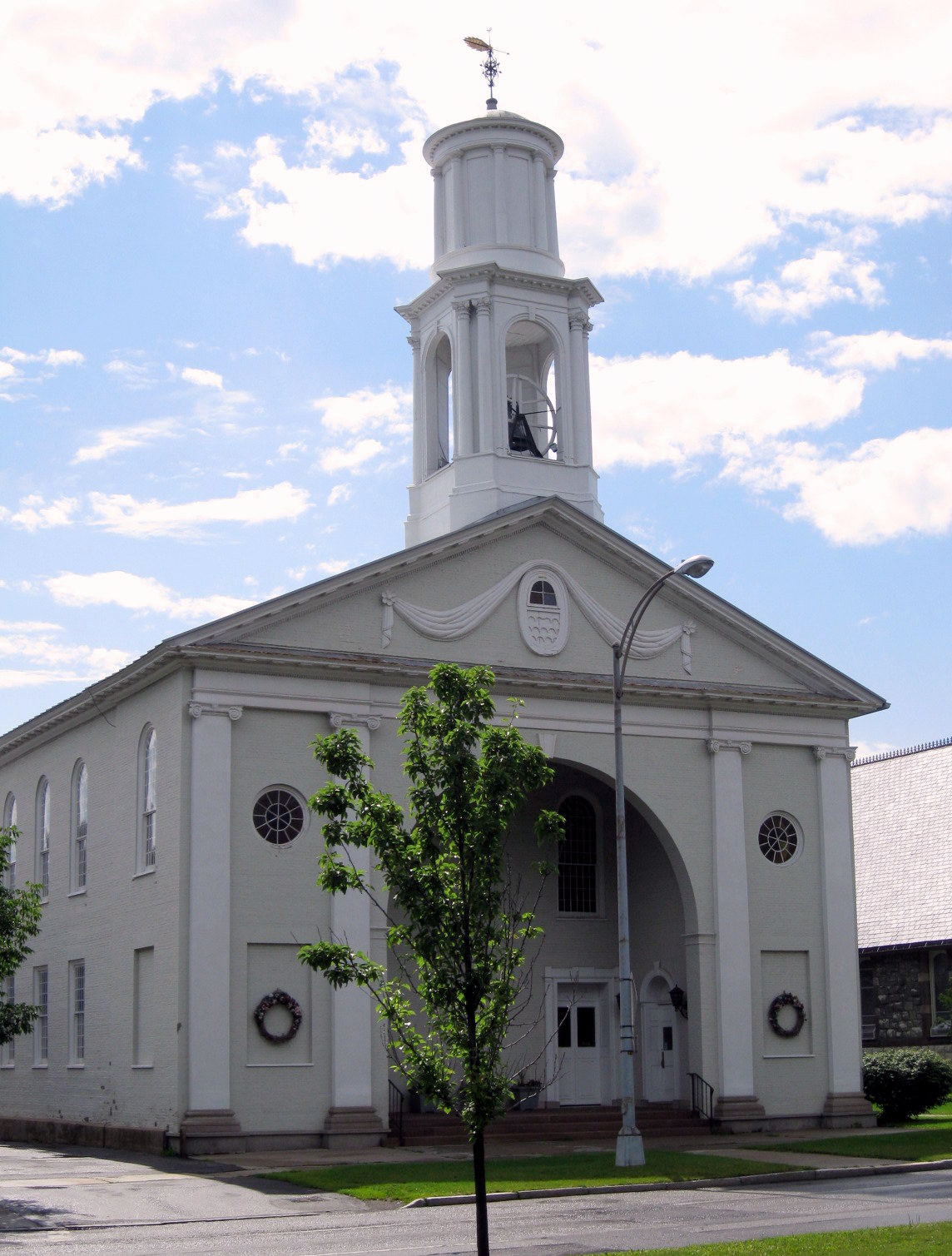
First Congregational Church, July 2009
