= Frederick Ferris Thompson =

American banker (1836–1899)

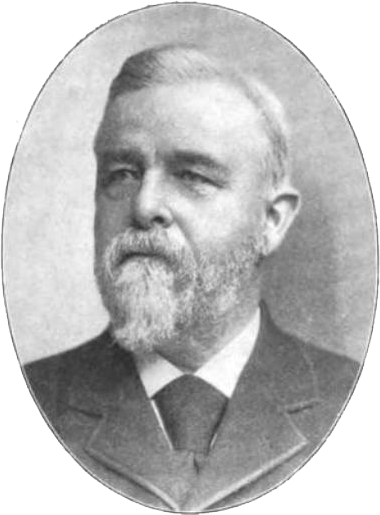
- Thompson in 1899
- Born: June 14, 1836; New York City, New York, U.S.
- Died: April 10, 1899 (aged 62); New York City, New York, U.S.
- Education: Williams College
- Occupations: Banker, railroad executive
- Employer: First National Bank of the City of New York
- Spouse: Mary Lee Clark (m. 1857)
- Parent: John Thompson

Frederick Ferris Thompson (June 14, 1836 – April 10, 1899) was an American banker and railroad president who co-founded the First National Bank and what is now Citibank. He was also an early amateur photographer and philanthropist.

== Early life ==
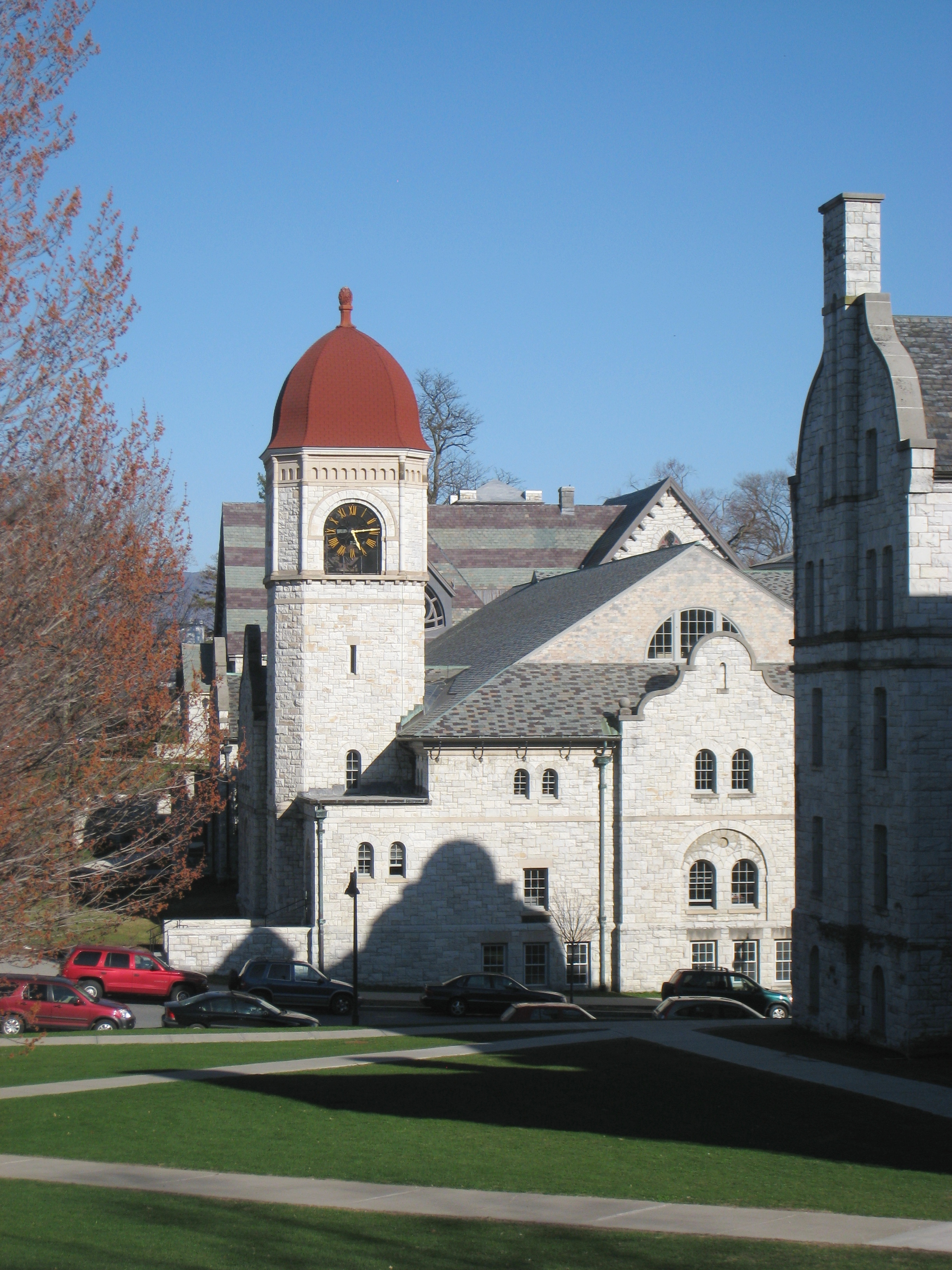
View of clocktower, Lasell Gymnasium, Williams College

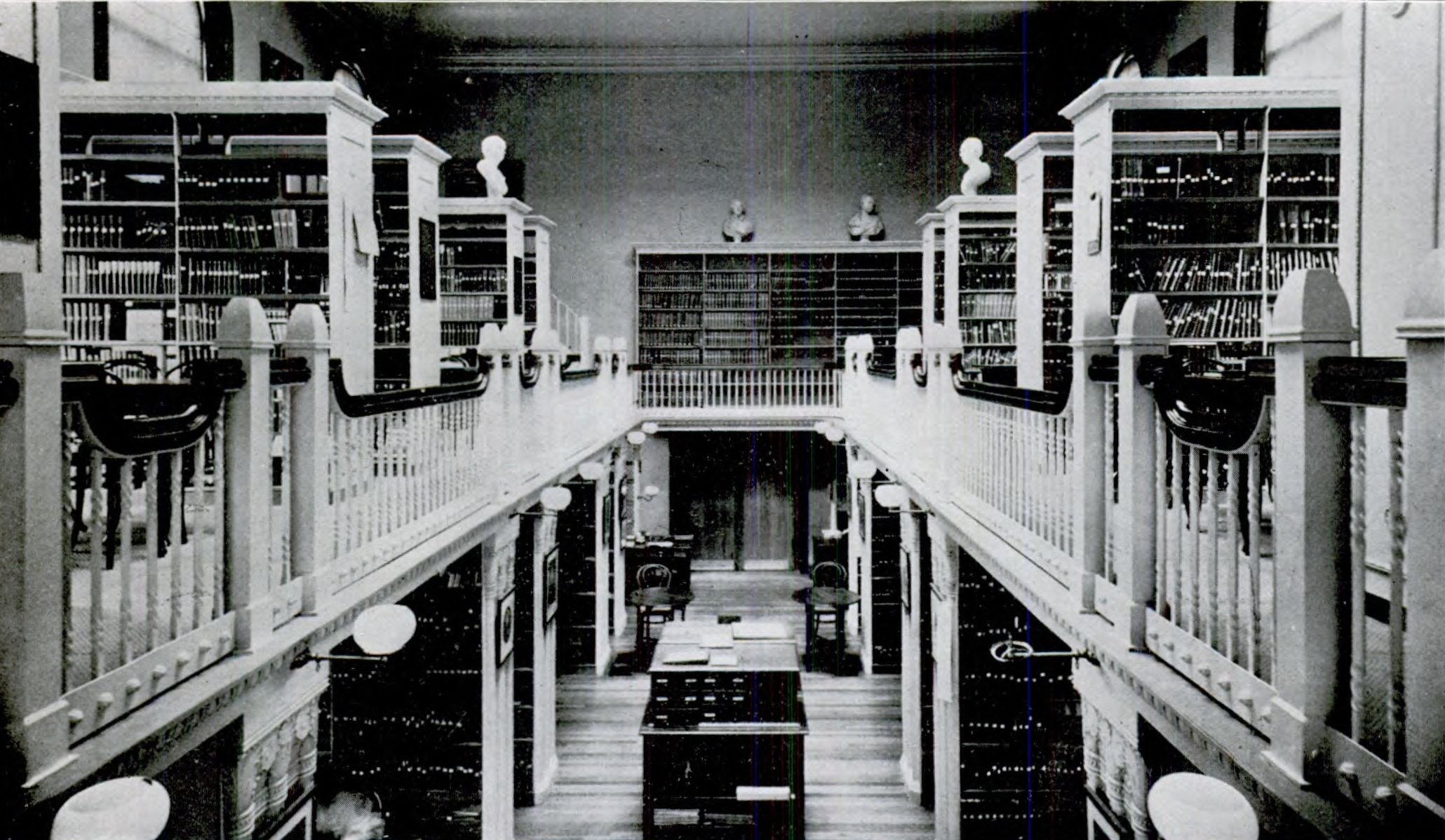
Thompson Library Annex, Vassar College, 1896

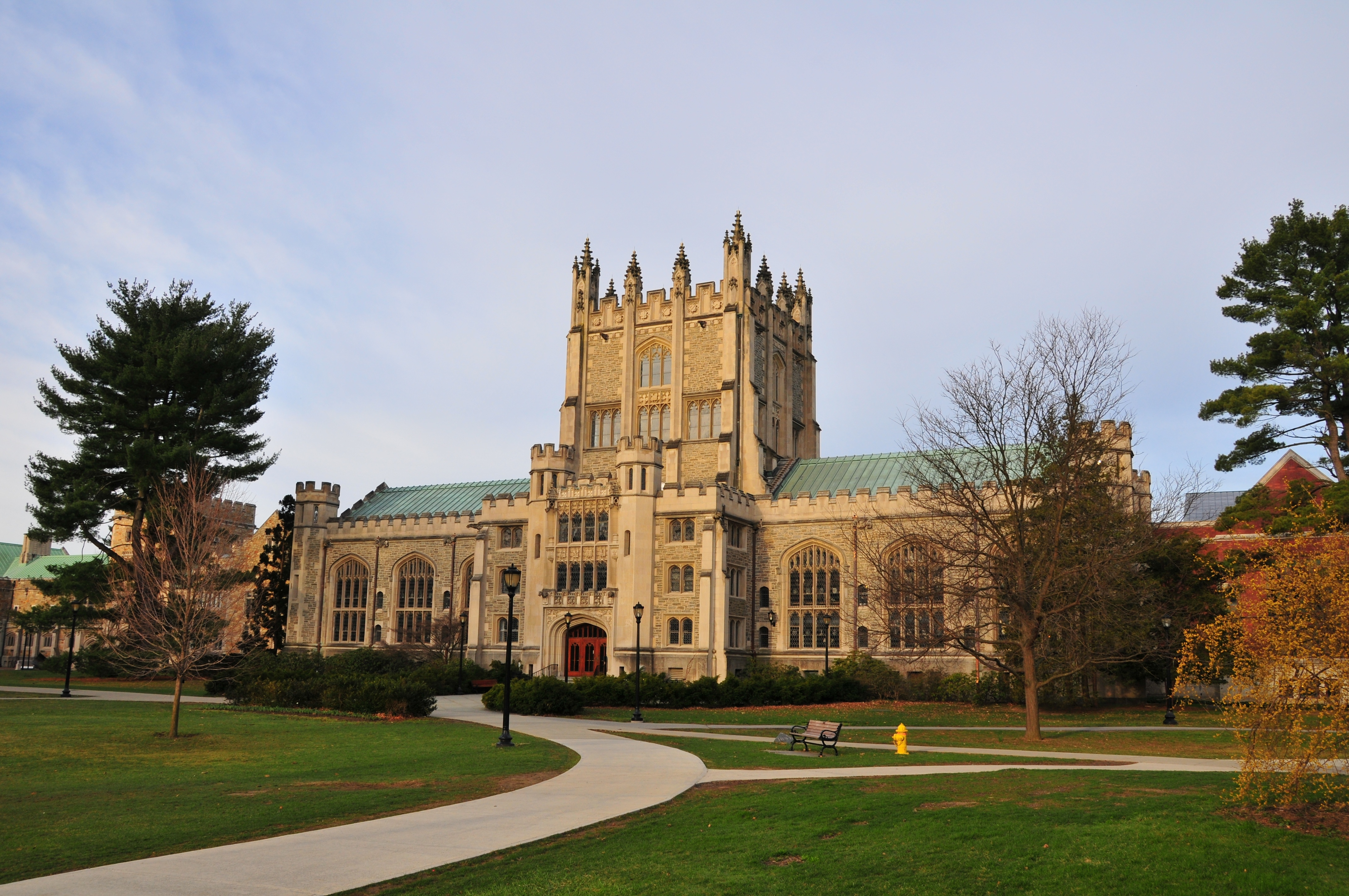
Thompson Library, Vassar College

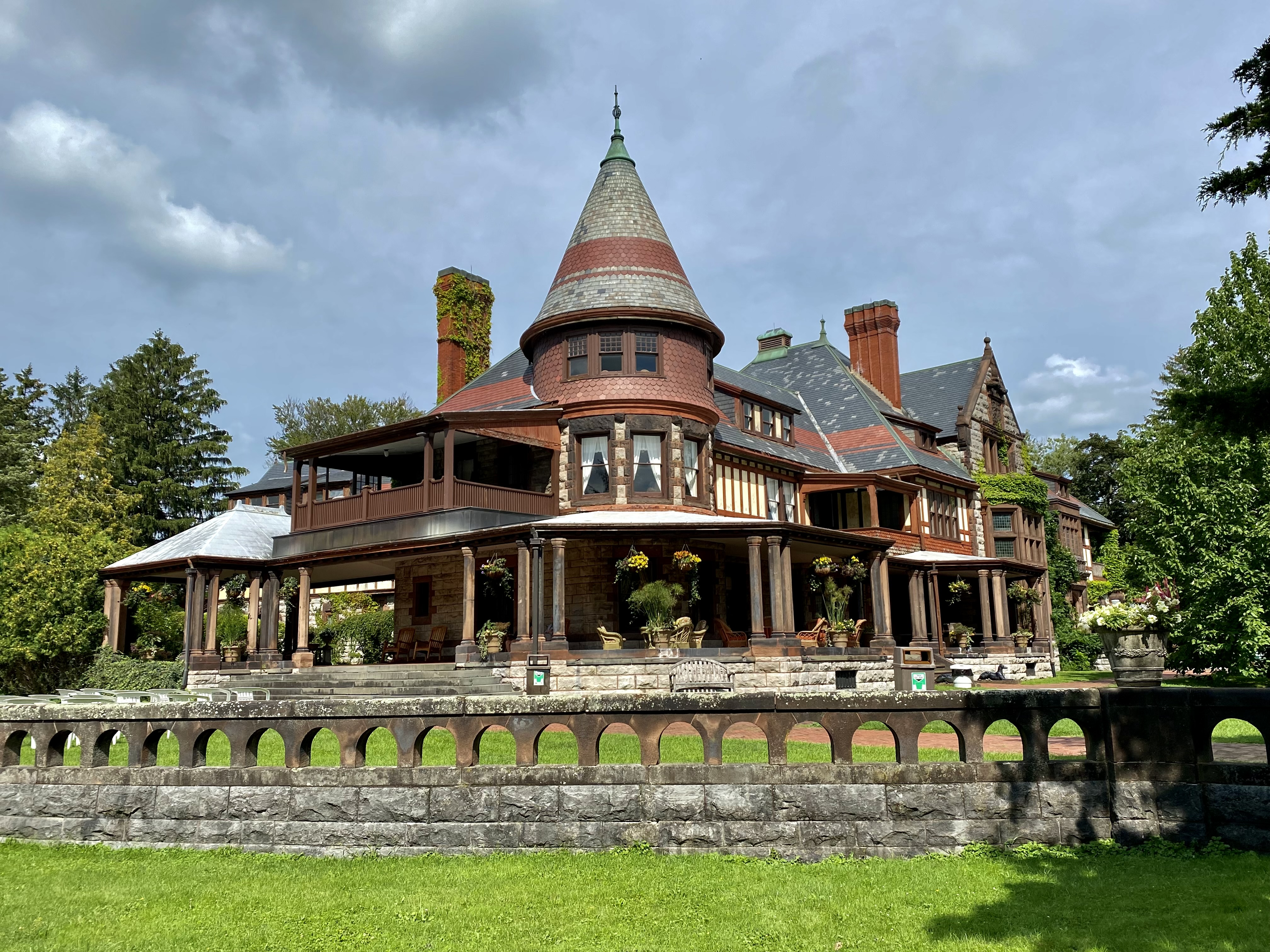
Sonnenberg Mansion

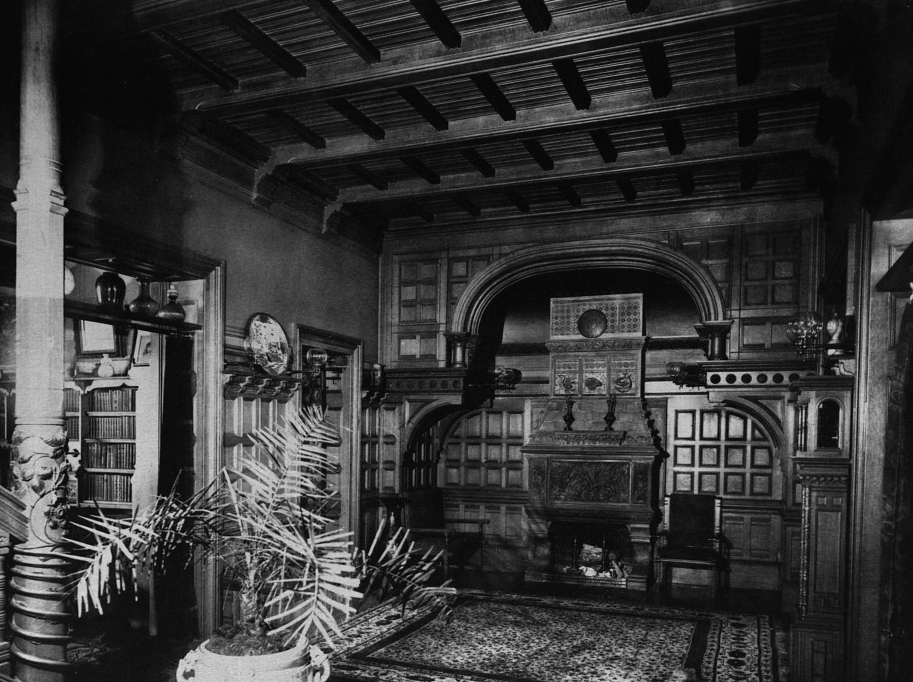
Hall, Thompson's Manhattan home, 1883

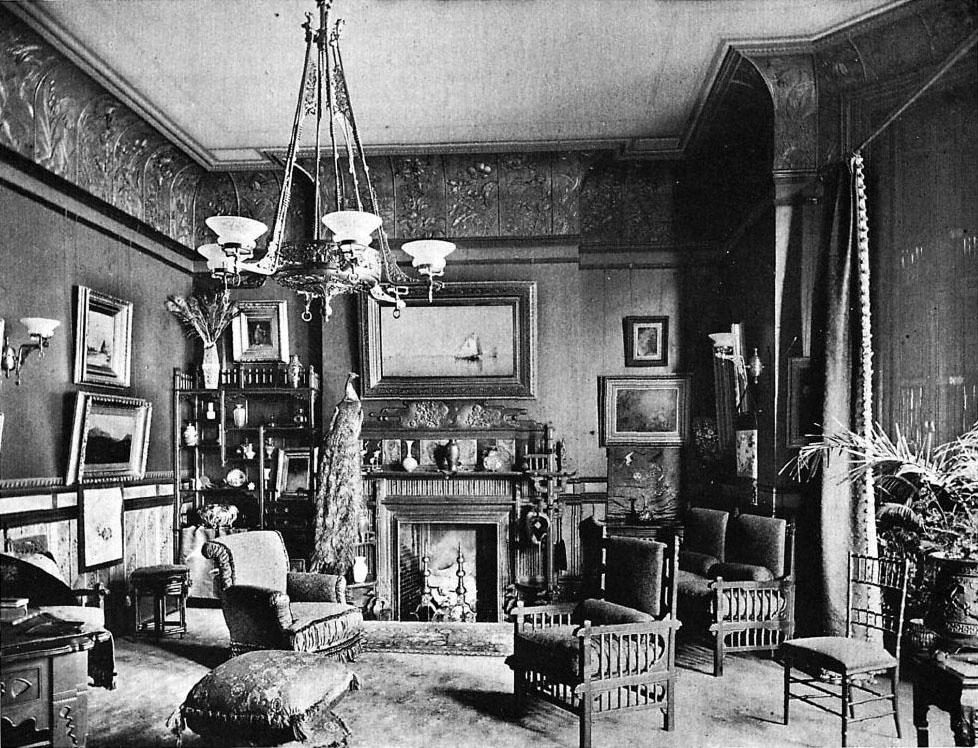
Drawing-room, Thompson's Manhattan home, 1883

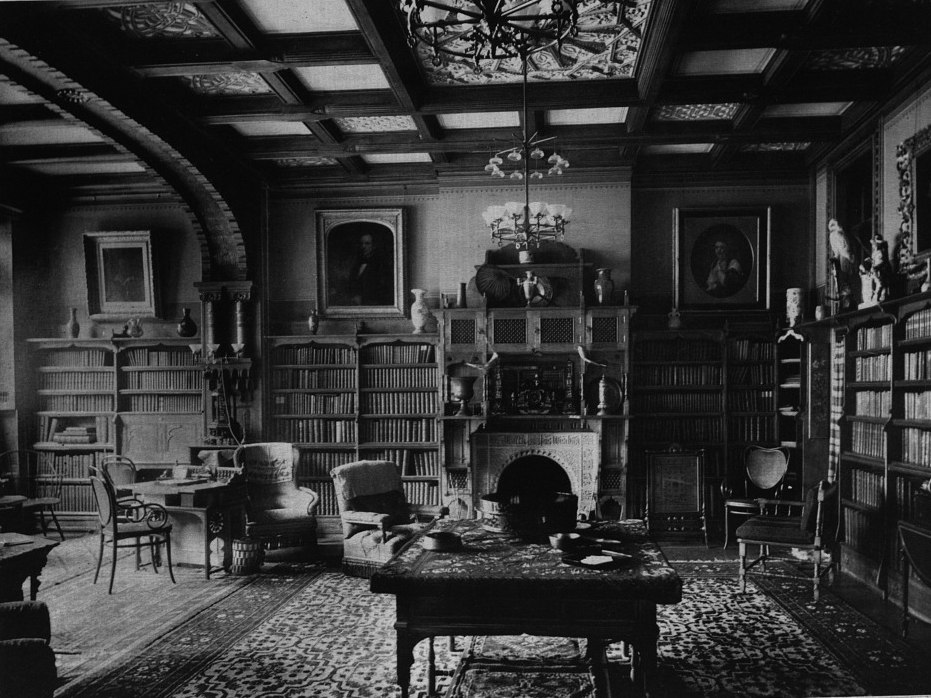
Library in Thompson's Manhattan home, 1883

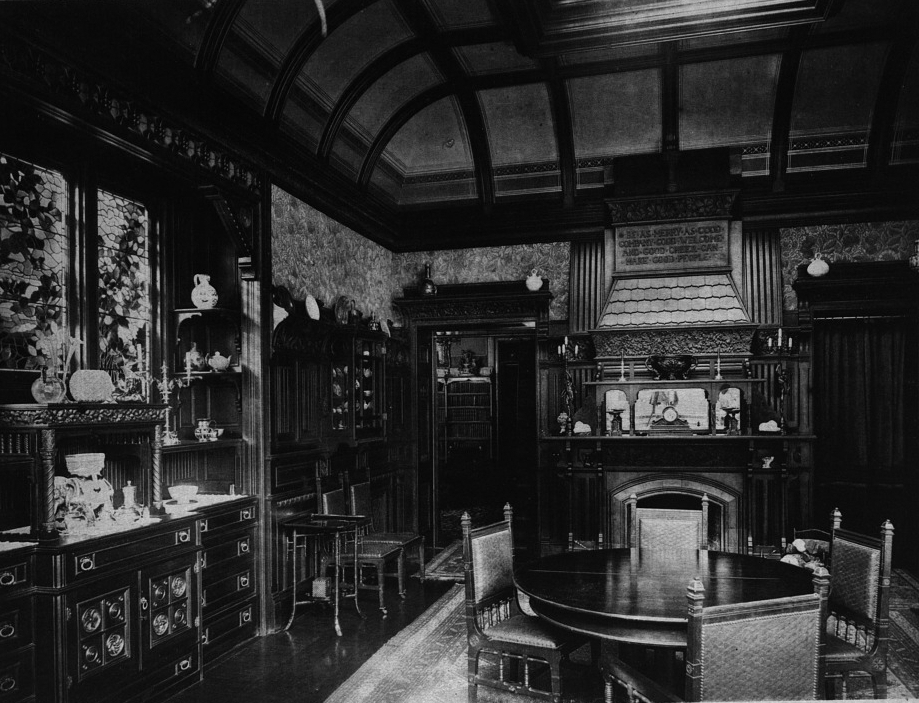
Dining room in Thompson's Manhattan home, 1883

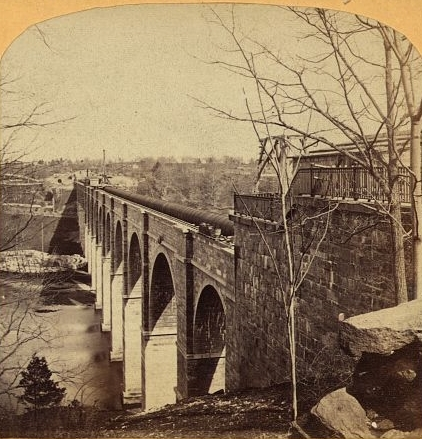
"High Bridge from south end showing the great water pipe" by Thompson, Amateur Photographic Exchange Club, 1863

Thompson was born in New York City. He was the son of Electa Ferris and John Thompson, a banker and publisher of Thompson's Bank Note Reporter.

Thompson attended Peacham Academy in Peacham, Vermont. Next, he went to Columbia College where he joined the Fraternity of Delta Psi (St. Anthony Hall).

He then attended Williams College from 1852 to 1854. While there, he founded the Lambda chapter of the Fraternity of Delta Psi. He left Williams after his sophomore year to go to Europe on business at his father's request in 1854. However, he did return to college, but did not graduate. He wrote, "I was only a quondam member of ’56, of two years’ presence in college, and a thorn in the side of the faculty of that day. Good old President Mark Hopkins gave me a special graduation certificate afterward, just to show that I was not kicked out of college..."

== Career ==
Thompson, his father, and his older brother Samuel C. Thompson founded their first bank called Thompson Brothers in 1857. In 1863, the trio opened their third bank, called the First National Bank of the City of New York—this was the first national bank under a new federal system. Thompson served as its vice-president and the bank grew to be the second largest in New York City. This bank survives as Citibank.

In 1873, John and Samuel Thompson left the First National Bank to form the Chase National Bank, named after their friend and the US Secretary of the Treasury Salmon P. Chase. As a result, Thompson became president of First National Bank.

In May 1884, First National Bank was drawn into a financial scandal, causing the Marine National Bank to fail. Grant, Ward & Co., who owed $77,000 to the Marine Bank, wrote three checks totaling $210,000 on a non-existent account from First National; the Clearing House for processing checks had cleared the checks, leaving Thompson with a $210,000 shortfall. This is nearly $6.2 million in today's money. First National went to court for a resolution as the check were processed the day the Marine Bank closed.

Thompson also founded and was president of the National Currency Bank of New York and started the First National Bank of Detroit, and the Columbia Bank in Chatham, New York.

On September 3, 1885, he was one of three incorporators of The Graphic Mining & Smelting Company in Chicago Illinois with $300,000 capital stock. That same year, he was a founding trustee of the American Electric Railway Company of New York. The company had $1 million in capital to build locomotive engines and cars.

In January 1888, Thompson was one of four investors who bailed out the failing Montgomery & Florida Railway (aka the Alabama & Florida Railroad). In August 1888, when the New York Elevated Railroad merged with the Manhattan Railway Company, Thompson was elected president of the new corporation.

In May 1894, Thompson was also elected to the board of the Maritime Canal Company of Nicaragua which was involved with the Nicaragua Canal project. The company had sold more than $22 million in stock in 1894. He became chairman of the company in 1898. Despite being incorporated by Congress, the Maritime Canal Company received no federal funding and ultimately defaulted on the project in 1899 because of lacking funds and the instability of Nicaragua.

== Philanthropy ==
Thompson and his wife donated large sums of money to numerous organizations, including the American Geographical Society, the Metropolitan Museum of Art, the Union League, and the Williams College Alumni Association. He was key to the construction of the Ontario Orphan Asylum and buildings for the Teachers College, Columbia University.

At Williams College, he donated a clock tower to Lasell Gymnasium in 1886. He donated the forty-acre Tallmade Farm to Williams College in 1887. In June 1888, he gave a challenge gift of $25,000 to construct a $100,000 memorial to Dr. Mark Hopkins, provided alumni donated the balance needed. The resulting Mark Hopkins Memorial building contained a library, art gallery, offices, and a room for lectures and recitations. In 1891, he offered to build a new library at his own expense. In 1895, he donated $175,000 for the construction of the Thompson Laboratories. In 1895, he donated $5,000 toward the construction of a new infirmary. He also supported scholarships, the Thompson Fund for lectures, and the annual Thompson Entertainments. At the time of his death, he was the most generous donor in the history of Williams College.

in 1898, the New York Times noted that "Mr. Thompson is a veritable fairy godfather to [Vassar] college." In 1887, Thompson donated $20,000 toward Vassar College's goal of a $200,000 endowment. When Vassar's new gymnasium opened in 1894, it had marble-lined, heated swimming pool, provided by Thompson. At the time, this was the largest swimming pool at any college gym in the country. He also donated $200,000 for a new library addition which was designed by Francis R. Allen. Opened in 1893, this three-story brick building featured Warsaw stone trim and a Tennessee marble staircase. Officially named the Frederick Ferris Thompson Annex Library, was also called "Uncle Fred's Nose."

He was affectionally known as "Uncle Fred" to the Vassar students, not just for these large gifts, but for making gifts that added to the students' comforts and learning experiences. In 1890, he donated $1,500 to set up an emergency fund to provide short-term, interest-free loans for Vassar students. He donated funds for the annual senior picnic each June. He provided a rocking chair for each girl's room, along with nice furnishing for the college's infirmary. He also sponsored the annual outing to Lake Mohonk for Vassar's freshmen and seniors—about 300 students in total—providing transportation, hotel accommodations, and meals. The freshmen from the class of 1902 sent him a thank you telegram saying: "Frederick F. Thompson, New York: Mohonk is grand and so are you: Accept the thanks of nineteen-two." He also gave each graduating student a silver spoon "as a symbol of his hope that she will be fortunate in the world."

Thompson served on the board of Williams College, Vassar College, Teachers College Columbia University, the New York Dispensary, the Ontario Orphan Asylum, and the Women's Hospital. He also served on the central council of the Charity Organization Society of the City of New York. The society distributed more than $22 million in 1887.

In June 1898 when Clara Barton sent an appeal to the newspaper to help the American National Red Cross' hospital ships serving the Americas in the Spanish-American War, Thompson was one the nine to become an immediate donor, giving $500.

== Honors ==
- Thompson received an honorary M.A. from Williams College in 1883.
- In 1893, the junior class at Williams College voted to hold its annual dinner in honor of Thompson.
- Williams College named Thompson Laboratories in his honor.
- In 1893, Vassar College named the library addition to its main building the Frederick Ferris Thompson Annex Library.
- When word of his death was received, Williams College canceled all classes and events.
- His widow, Mary Clark Thompson, built F. F. Thompson Hospital (now Thompson Health) in his name in Canandaigua, New York.
- His portrait by John Harrison Littlefield is in the collection of the National Portrait Gallery.
- Mary Clark Thompson donated the Frederick Ferris Thompson Memorial Library building to Vassar College.
- There is a portrait of Thompson in the Williams College Museum of Art.
- Mary Clark Thompson donated Frederick Thompson Memorial Chapel to Williams College in his honor.
- President Theodore Roosevelt attended the dedication of the Frederick Thompson Memorial Chapel.
- The Frederick Ferris Thompson Memorial Building, a gymnasium for the woman students at Teachers College, Columbia University, was funded by his widow in 1904.
- After his death, Mary Clark Thompson renovated and expanded the gardens at Sonnenberg Mansion as a living memorial to her husband.
- Sonnenberg, its gardens, and fifty acres survive as Sonnenberg Gardens and Mansion, a New York State Historic Park.

== Personal life ==
On June 17, 1857, Thompson married Mary Lee Clark in Canandaigua, New York. She was the daughter Myron H. Clark, the governor of New York. Thompson met her when she was in Albany, New York with her father. The couple did not have any children.

Their main home was at 283 Madison Avenue in New York City. It was featured in Artistic Homes magazine in 1883. The house had a hidden staircase, a thirty-square-foot library, and eight stained glass windows depicting The Pilgrim's Progress. Their drawing room had a red wall and red cherry woodwork, and a matching cherrywood grand piano, with bronze reliefs of lilies and sunflowers on the ceiling. The drawing room also featured paintings by John Bunyan Bristol, Sanford Robinson Gifford, William Hart, John Frederick Kensett, Emanuel Leutze, and Alexander Helwig Wyant. The dining room had ten-foot tall paneled mahogany wainscotting and a barreled ceiling. The house also had a billiard room and bowling alley. It was lit by gas, but had electric starters. The house also had a steam elevator, placing it amongst an elite group of New York City homes owned by Jabez A. Bostick, E.N. Dickinson, J. P. Morgan, Frederic W. Stevens, and William Kissam. Vanderbilt.

In 1863, the Thompsons purchased a 300-acre farm near Canandaigua Lake in Canandaigua, New York for their summer home. They called it Sonnenberg which is German for “sunny hill." Around 1887, they built Sonnenberg Mansion on the site. This Queen Anne style mansion had forty rooms. The site also included nine gardens, aviaries, the Palm House, and the 13,000-square-foot greenhouse complex.

Starting in the early 1860s through the 1880s, Thompson was an avid photographer. At that time, this hobby took time, money, a knowledge of chemistry, and the ability to transport heavy and bulky equipment. Thompson used a dry process, as opposed to the dominant wet condition. He believed this provided more flexibility in processing landscape photographs. He was one of three founding member of the Amateur Photographic Exchange Club in 1861. Thompson was the club secretary, writing and printing a newsletter on his hand printing press. However, this club ended in 1863 because of the Civil War.

He was the secretary of the American Photographical Society in the 1860s. This organization included both leading professional and amateur photographers of New York. He also was a judge for the Anthony Prize Pitcher awards. He also wrote articles for photographic journals, sometimes signed “The Straggling Amateur.”

During the Civil War, Thompson organized and drilled members of the US Colored Troops. he hoped that they would be allowed to fight for the Union. He was also a caption in the 37th New York Artillery. However, he did not see any battlefield action. Thompson said his regiment "never saw a battle, and neither fought, bled, nor died."

He belonged to the American Institute, the American Geographical Society, the American Association for the Advancement of Science, the Archaeological Institute of America—New York chapter, the City of Auburn Society, the Folk-Lore Society, the Microscopical Society, and the New York Historical Society. He was also a member and board member of the New England Society of New York. He was a member of the American Fine Arts Society, the American Museum of Natural History, the Metropolitan Museum of Art. He belonged to the Barnard Club, the Groiler Club, the Red Jacket Club of Canandaigua, the St. Anthony Club of New York, and the Union League Club.

In February 1888, he was one of the many vice presidents of Citizens in Favor of High License and Restrictions of the Liquor Traffic.

In 1899, Thompson died at his home in New York City. His funeral was held at his house on Madison Avenue. He was buried at Woodlawn Cemetery in Canandaigua, New York.

== See also ==
- List of Williams College people
