= Canandaigua Historic District =

Historic district in New York, United States

- U.S. National Register of Historic Places
- U.S. Historic district
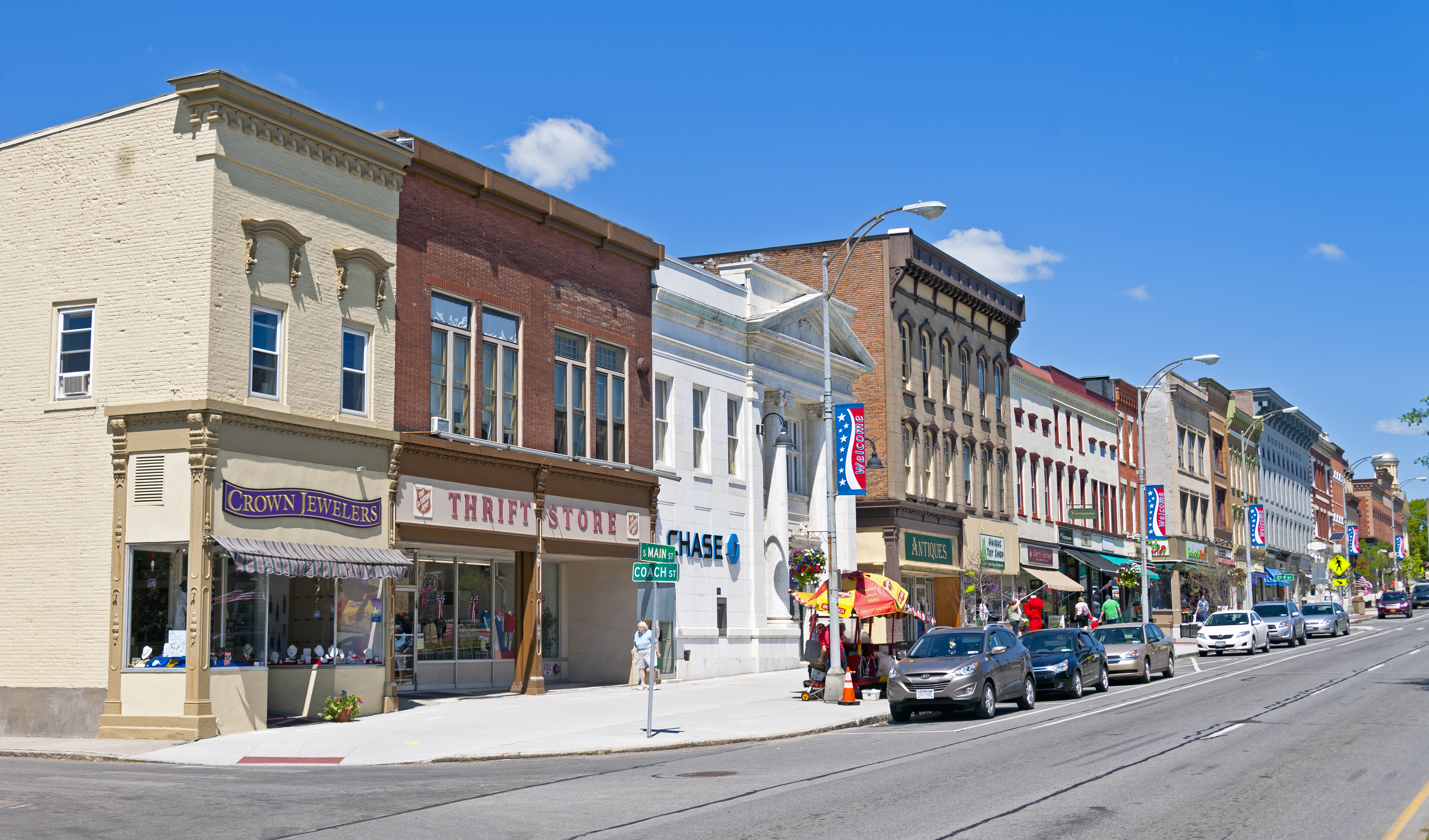
- Buildings along west side of Main Street, 2014

- Location within New York Location within the United States
- Location: Catherine, Dungan, Brook, Hubble & Sly Sts., portions of Park, Wood, Washington, Howell, Bemis, Main & Gibson Sts, Canandaigua, New York
- Coordinates: 42°53′24″N 77°16′59″W
- Area: 125 acres (51 ha)
- Built: 1810
- Architectural style: Greek Revival, Italianate, Colonial Revival
- MPS: Canandaigua MRA
- NRHP reference No.: 84002856 (original); 16000345 (increase)

Significant dates
- Added to NRHP: April 26, 1984
- Boundary increase: June 7, 2016

Canandaigua Historic District is a national historic district located at Canandaigua in Ontario County, New York. The district includes 354 residential, commercial, religious, and civic properties (338 contributing) that constitute the historic core of Canandaigua. It incorporates the North Main Street Historic District. The structures date from the 1810s to 1930s and contains a number of distinctive buildings reflecting a variety of architectural styles including Greek Revival, Italianate, Colonial Revival. The Ontario County Courthouse is located within the district boundaries. Located in the district is the separately listed former United States Post Office.

It was listed on the National Register of Historic Places in 1984. In 2016, an isolated area of 68 additional properties was added to the district after they were found to be sufficiently historic.

== Gallery ==
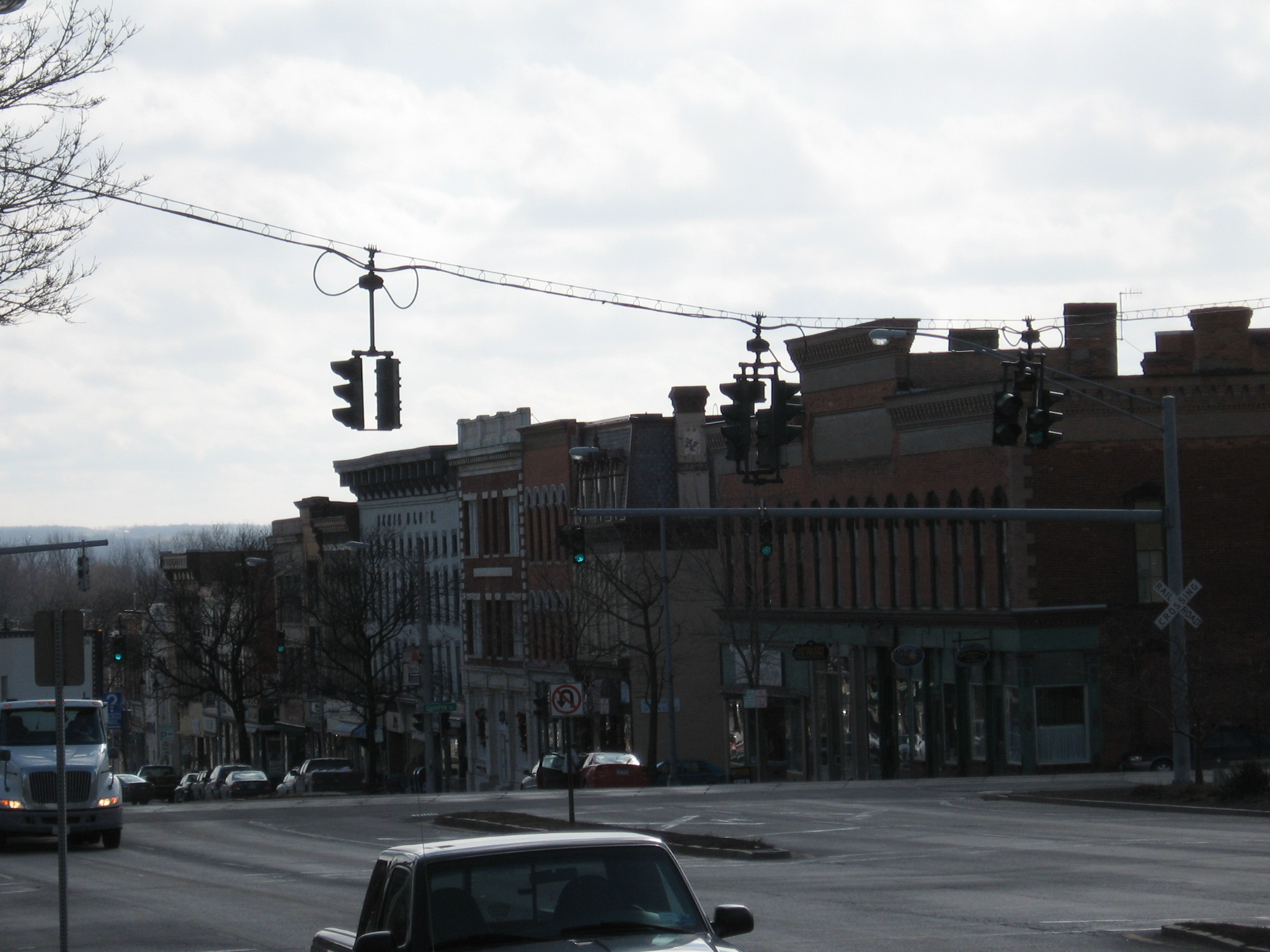
Main Street, Canandaigua, NY

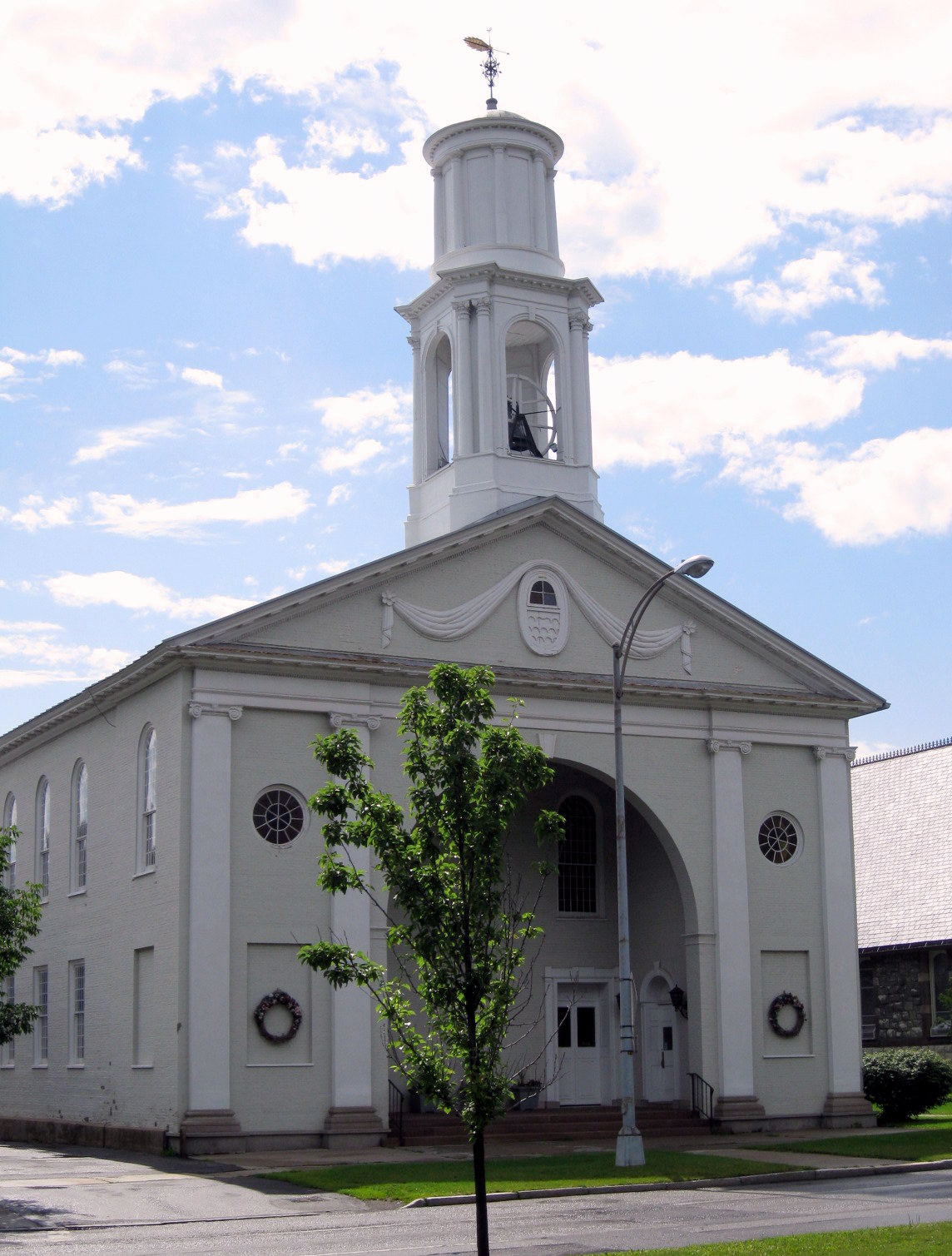
First Congregational Church, July 2009

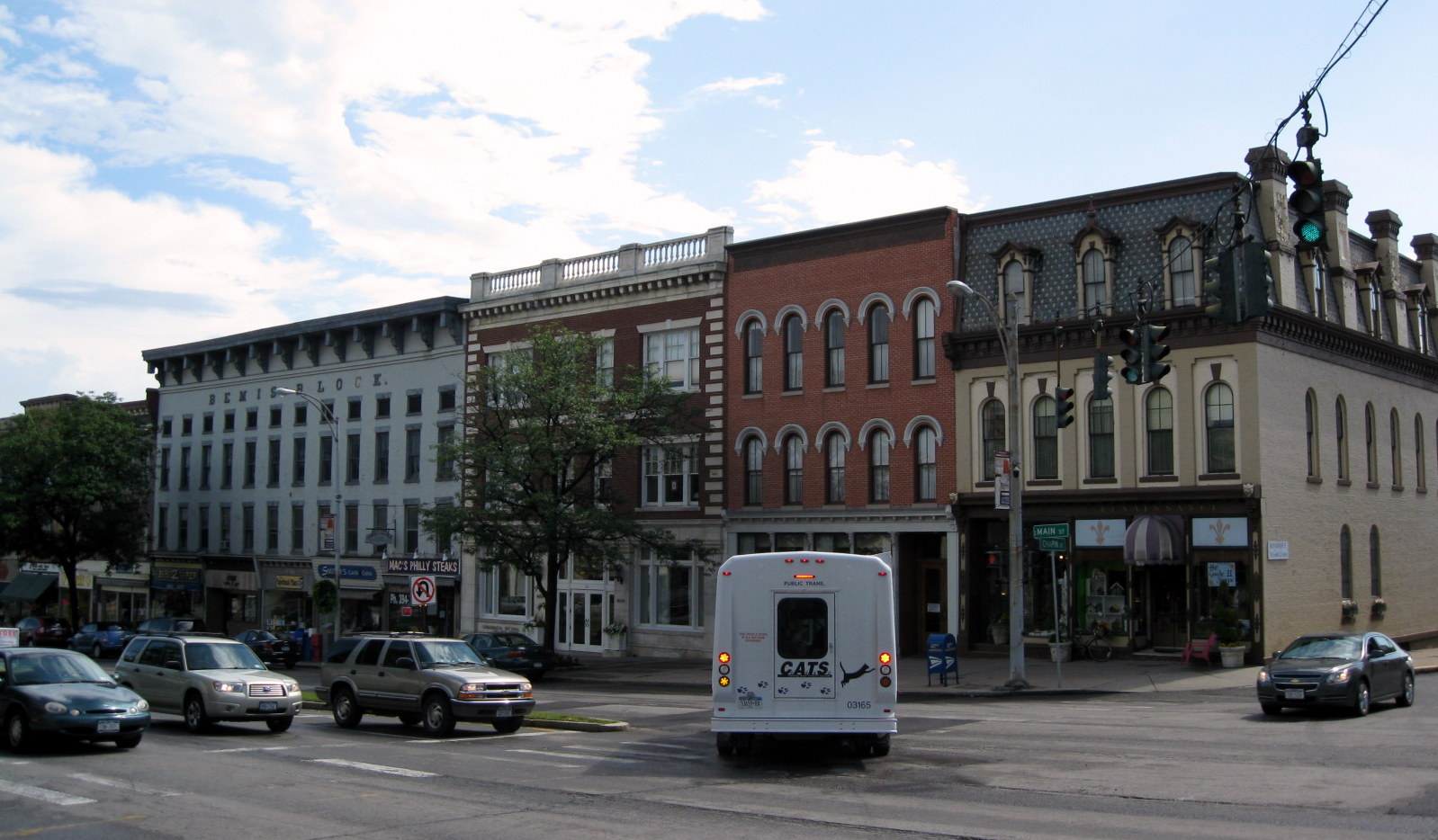
Main Street, July 2009

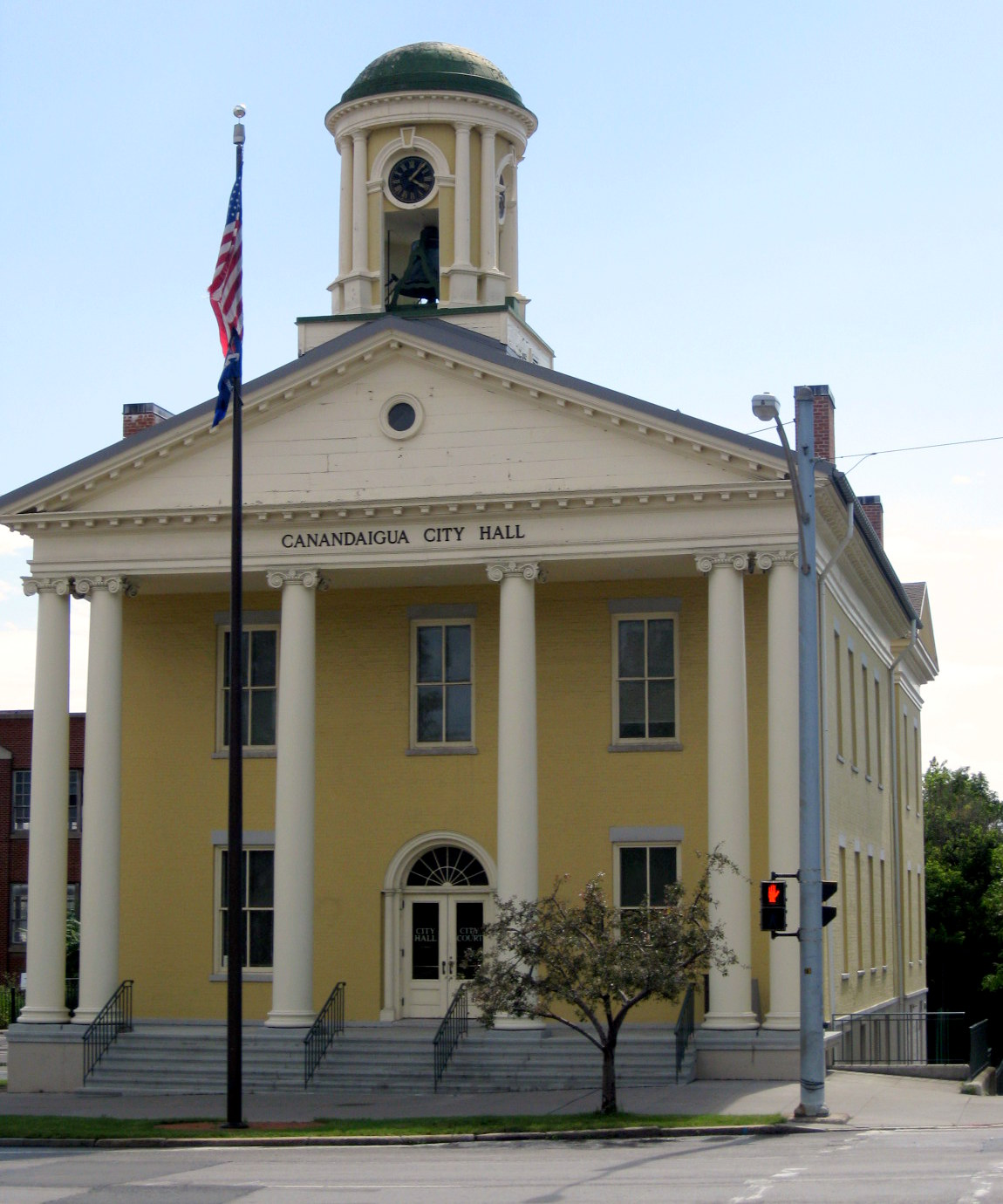
Canandaigua City Hall, July 2009

== See also ==
- National Register of Historic Places listings in Ontario County, New York
