= Mary Clark Thompson =

American philanthropist (1835–1923)

Mary Clark Thompson (1835 – July 28, 1923), born Mary Lee Clark, was an American philanthropist and wife of banker Frederick Ferris Thompson.

== Early years ==
Mary Lee Clark was born in Naples, New York, in 1835 to Myron Holley Clark (1806–1892) and Zilpha (née Watkins) Clark (1806–1877). She moved with her family to Canandaigua, New York, when she was about two years old.

She attended various schools in Ontario County, including the Ontario Female Seminary. Mary's father Myron was elected Governor of New York State in 1855, and the family took up residence in Albany, the state's capital.

== Philanthropy ==
Thompson and her husband became generous benefactors to multiple organizations and established themselves as philanthropists. Some of the more notable institutions benefited by Thompson endowments and donations include Williams College, Vassar College, and Teacher's College (now Columbia University). Thompson was one of the founders of the Metropolitan Museum of Art, and a great benefactor to the Bronx Zoo and Woman's Hospital.

Her husband died in 1899 at age 62 in New York City, and Mary continued to make Sonnenberg her summer home. She continued to give generously to civic, religious, and educational institutions, though her philanthropic work focused principally on the community in which she lived. In Canandaigua, she established and built the F.F. Thompson Hospital in 1903 and the Woodlawn Cemetery chapel, and a swimming school on the shore of Canandaigua Lake. She established a retirement home which she named Clark Manor House after her parents. She donated land and money for the city's post office, and contributed heavily to the local Ontario County historical society, the Wood Library, and numerous local churches.

She had an interest in preserving the history of Native Americans in the New York area, and made multiple contributions to the State Museum in Albany for that purpose.

== Personal life ==
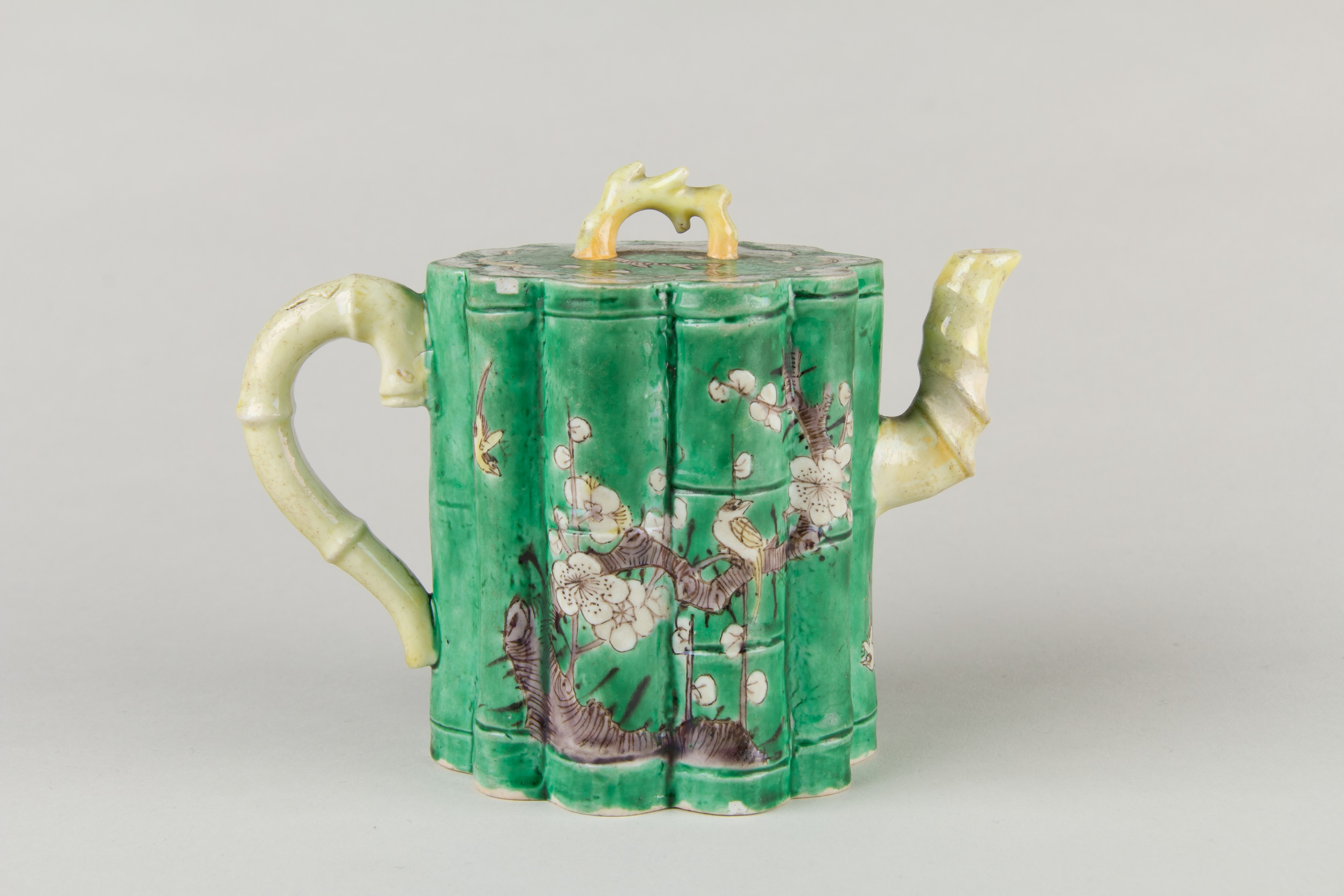
Porcelain teapot, bequest of Mary Clark Thompson to the Metropolitan Museum of Art, 1923

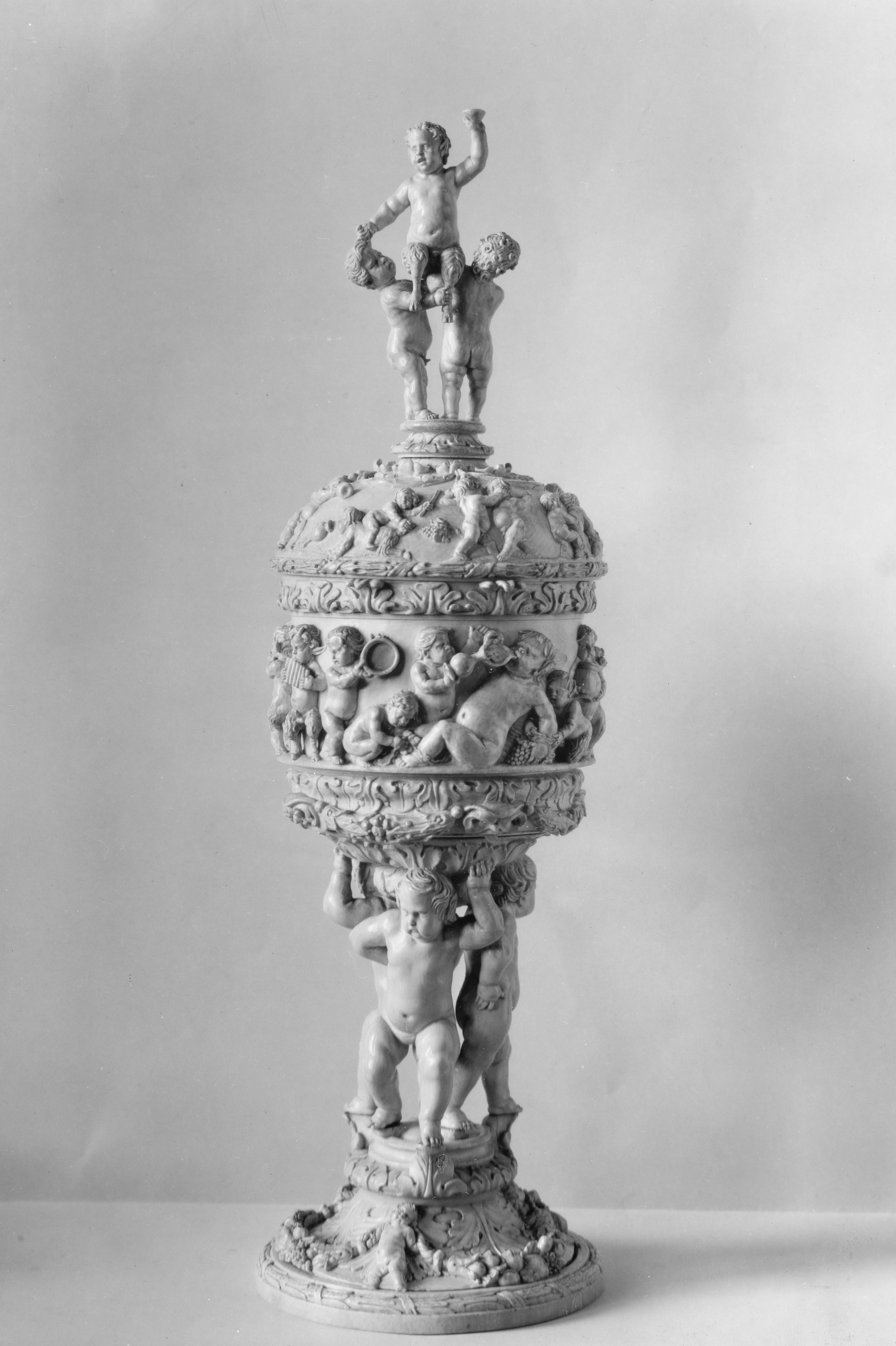
Flemish Cup, bequest of Mary Clark Thompson to the Metropolitan Museum of Art, 1923

While in Albany, Mary met her future husband, Frederick Ferris Thompson, son of prominent New York banker John Thompson. The couple were married on June 17, 1857, in Canandaigua. Frederick, his brother Samuel, and their father founded First National Bank of the City of New York (a predecessor to today's Citibank) and Chase National Bank of the City of New York (a predecessor to today's JPMorgan Chase Bank).

Although the Thompson's principal residence was at 283 Madison Avenue in New York City, the couple spent their summers in Mary's girlhood home of Canandaigua on an estate they purchased in 1863. The estate was named Sonnenberg (means "sunny hill" in German) when they purchased it. In 1885, they tore down the farmhouse and replaced it with a 40-room Queen-Anne style mansion.

Her interests included enjoyment of gardens, and she had nine formal gardens built at Sonnenberg. Often she would allow the public to come on the property and walk through her gardens.

Her husband died in 1899 at age 62 in New York City, Mary died on July 28, 1923, at age 87 at Sonnenberg. Mary and Frederick, who had no children, are both interred at Woodlawn Cemetery in Canandaigua.

== Honors and legacy ==
In 1920 she was awarded the Cornplanter Medal for her work in Native American history.

Her home, Sonnenberg, is preserved and operated as a historic house museum.

The Mary Clark Thompson Medal is named for her. It has been awarded since 1921 by the American National Academy of Sciences for work in geology and paleontology.
