= Myron H. Clark =

19th Governor of New York (1806–1892)

Myron Holley Clark
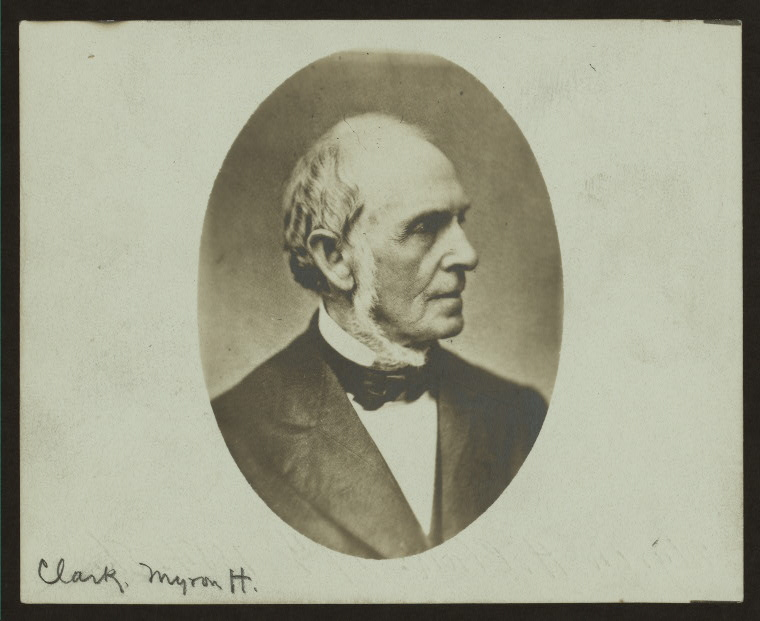

19th Governor of New York
- In office January 1, 1855 – December 31, 1856
- Lieutenant: Henry Jarvis Raymond
- Preceded by: Horatio Seymour
- Succeeded by: John Alsop King

Member of the New York State Assembly from the 29th district
- In office January 1, 1852 – December 31, 1854
- Preceded by: Charles Colt
- Succeeded by: William H. Goodwin

Personal details
- Born: October 23, 1806 Naples, New York
- Died: August 23, 1892 (aged 85) Canandaigua, New York
- Party: Whig
- Spouse: Zilpha Watkins
- Relations: Clark Williams (grandson)
- Children: Mary Clark Thompson

Myron Holley Clark (October 23, 1806 – August 23, 1892) was an American politician from New York. He served as the 19th Governor of New York from 1855 to 1856.

== Early life ==
Clark was born in Naples, Ontario County, New York on October 23, 1806. He was the eldest son of Maj. Joseph Clark (1782–1840) and Mary (née Sutton) Clark (1782–1865). His grandfather, Col. William Clark, had migrated to Ontario County from Berkshire County, Massachusetts, in 1790 after the American Revolution.

His education was limited and was in the common schools of New York.

== Career ==
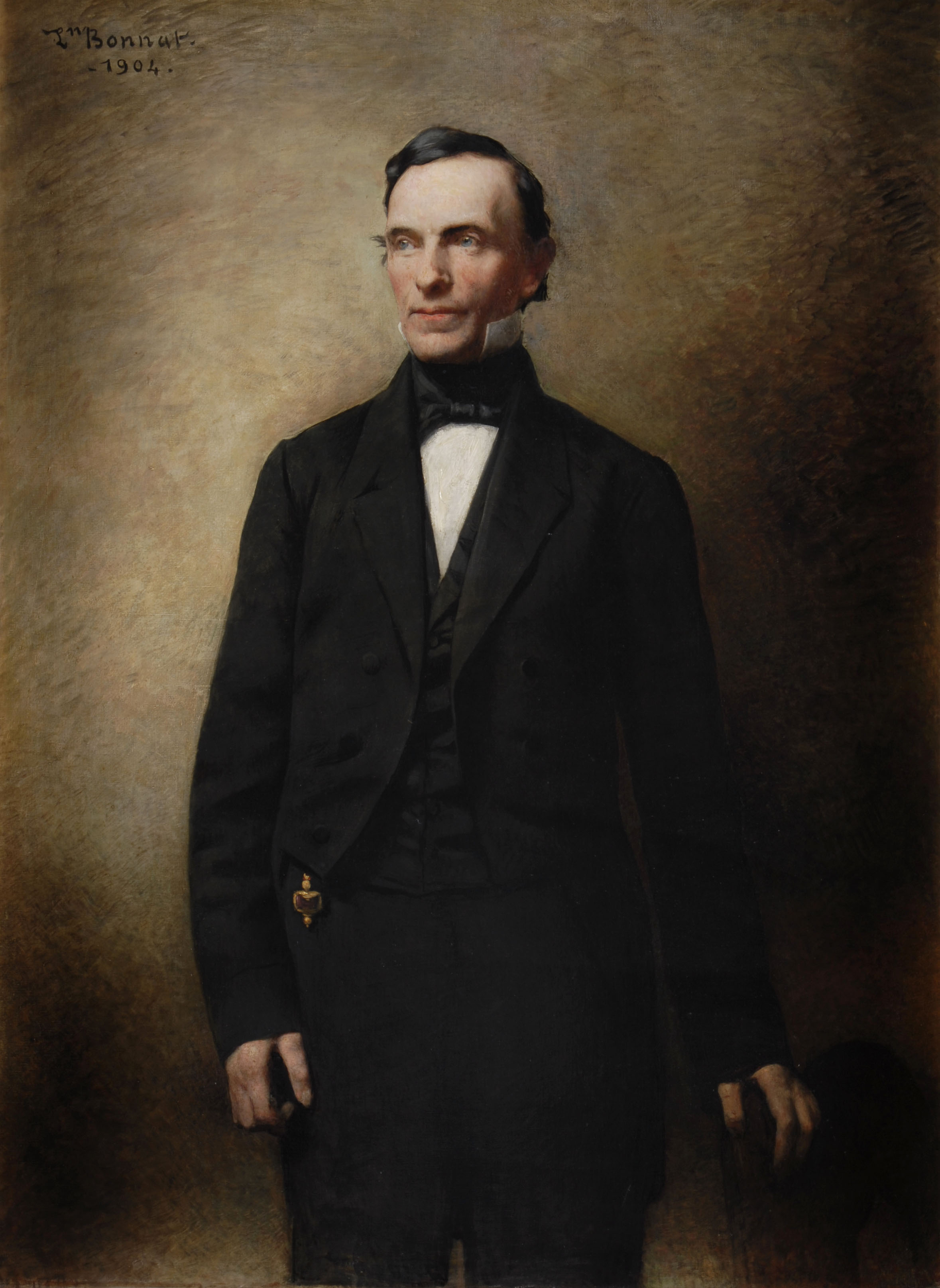
Gubernatorial portrait of New York Governor Myron H. Clark.

He served in the state's militia as a lieutenant colonel and then entered politics, first serving as President of the then-village of Canandaigua, New York, and eventually becoming Sheriff of Ontario County, New York.

He was a member of the New York State Senate (29th D.) from 1852 to 1854, sitting in the 75th, 76th and 77th New York State Legislatures. At the New York state election, 1854, he was nominated as the Whig candidate, and was elected Governor of New York in the closest gubernatorial election in New York State history. He served as Governor from January 1, 1855, to December 31, 1856.

As Governor, Clark was noted for his meddling with militia appointments, causing the resignation of the state Adjutant General John Watts de Peyster. In 1862, President Abraham Lincoln appointed Clark the first Collector of Internal Revenue of in the Ontario County district.

Clark made several attempts to effect prohibition in the state and signed a prohibition law while governor, but the law was declared unconstitutional by the New York Court of Appeals. His steadfast advocating of temperance led to his nomination on the Prohibition ticket to run again for Governor at the New York state election, 1874. He finished in third place, behind Democrat Samuel J. Tilden and the incumbent Republican Governor John Adams Dix.

== Personal life ==
In 1830 Clark was married to Zilpha Watkins (1806–1877), a daughter of Andrew Watkins and Abigail (née Stanley) Watkins. Together, they were the parents of five children, one son and four daughters, including:

- Lorenzo Elijah Clark (1833–1917), a banker who married Elizabeth Sheley, a daughter of Alanson Sheley.
- Zilpha Clark (1834–1915), who married Samuel D. Backus.
- Mary Lee Clark (1835–1923), who married prominent banker Frederick Ferris Thompson.
- Charlotte Elizabeth Clark (1838–1929), who died unmarried.
- Abigail Stanley Clark (1843–1902), who married banker George Norton Williams, in 1866.

Clark died in Canandaigua, New York on August 23, 1892. He is interred at Woodlawn Cemetery in Canandaigua.

=== Legacy ===
As a memorial to Clark, his daughter Mary presented a scenic and geologically significant tract of land to New York State in 1915 that is now part of Clark Reservation State Park. Comptroller Clark Williams was his grandson.

Party political offices
Preceded by Washington Hunt	Whig nominee for Governor of New York; 1854	Succeeded by None
New York State Senate
Preceded by Charles Colt	New York State Senate; 29th District; 1852–1854	Succeeded by William H. Goodwin
Political offices
Preceded by Horatio Seymour	Governor of New York; 1855–1856	Succeeded by John A. King
