= John Bunyan Bristol =

American painter

John Bunyan Bristol (1826–1909) was an American landscape painter born in Hillsdale, New York.

== Career ==
Self-taught, Bristol studied from nature and originally painted figure and portrait paintings. He abandoned these genres in order to devote his skillful hand to landscape painting. Bristol studied briefly with the painter Henry Ary. He painted from his home in Massachusetts and created highly detailed images which typically combined water and land views. He traveled to Florida in 1859 and produced several tropical pictures which attracted attention to his work. In the 1880s he began to exhibit oil paintings of the northern Adirondacks around Whiteface Mountain and Lake Placid.

He was a longtime member of the National Academy of Design and the Century Association. He was honored with medals at the 1876 Centennial Exhibition and at the 1900 Paris Exposition. He died on August 31, 1909, in the Home for the Incurables in New York City. He had been taken there in the year prior following a stroke that caused paralysis. He was interred at Woodlawn Cemetery in the Bronx.

== Museums ==
- Adirondack Museum
